= Émile Hugonnard =

- Born: 7 August 1859; Lyon, France
- Died: 9 November 1903 (aged 44); Lyon, France
- Occupations: Carpenter, cabinetmaker, firefighter
- Known for: Convicted in the Trial of the 66 (1883)
- Movement: Anarchism
- Parent(s): Jean-Baptiste Hugonnard, Claudine Berlioz

Émile Hugonnard (1859-1903), also known by the nickname Michel Hugonnard, was a French anarchist, carpenter, cabinetmaker, and firefighter. He is best known for being accused and convicted of membership in the International during the Trial of the 66 in January 1883.

Born in Lyon and holding several jobs, Hugonnard joined the anarchist movement at a relatively young age, either before or in his early twenties. During this period, he moved in the same circles as several figures of the movement, such as Toussaint Bordat and Émile Gautier. Following the Montceau-les-Mines troubles and the Assommoir bombing, he was accused of belonging to the International. Although he denied any link to the Lyon Revolutionary Federation or any such organization, the fact that he was a shareholder of Le Droit social and traveled to Villefranche-sur-Saône as a delegate for the federation led to his conviction at the trial. He received one of the lightest sentences among those convicted: six months in prison, a fifty-franc fine, and five years' loss of civic rights. His appeal failed, and his sentence was upheld.

Hugonnard subsequently moved to Geneva, Switzerland, where he lived with his family until 1887, when he returned to Lyon. In the early 1890s, he remained active within the anarchist movement, participating in the Geneva Congress (1890) and continuing to be arrested by the authorities. He died in 1903.

== Biography ==
Émile Hugonnard was born in Lyon on 7 August 1859, the son of Claudine Berlioz and Jean-Baptiste Hugonnard.

He worked as a carpenter, cabinetmaker, and firefighter, and also became an anarchist. At the time, Hugonnard lived at 110 rue Sully in Lyon. In the early 1880s, he was a member of the Revolutionary Federation of the East, which brought together most of the region's anarchists, along with his two sisters, Louise and Marie Hugonnard.

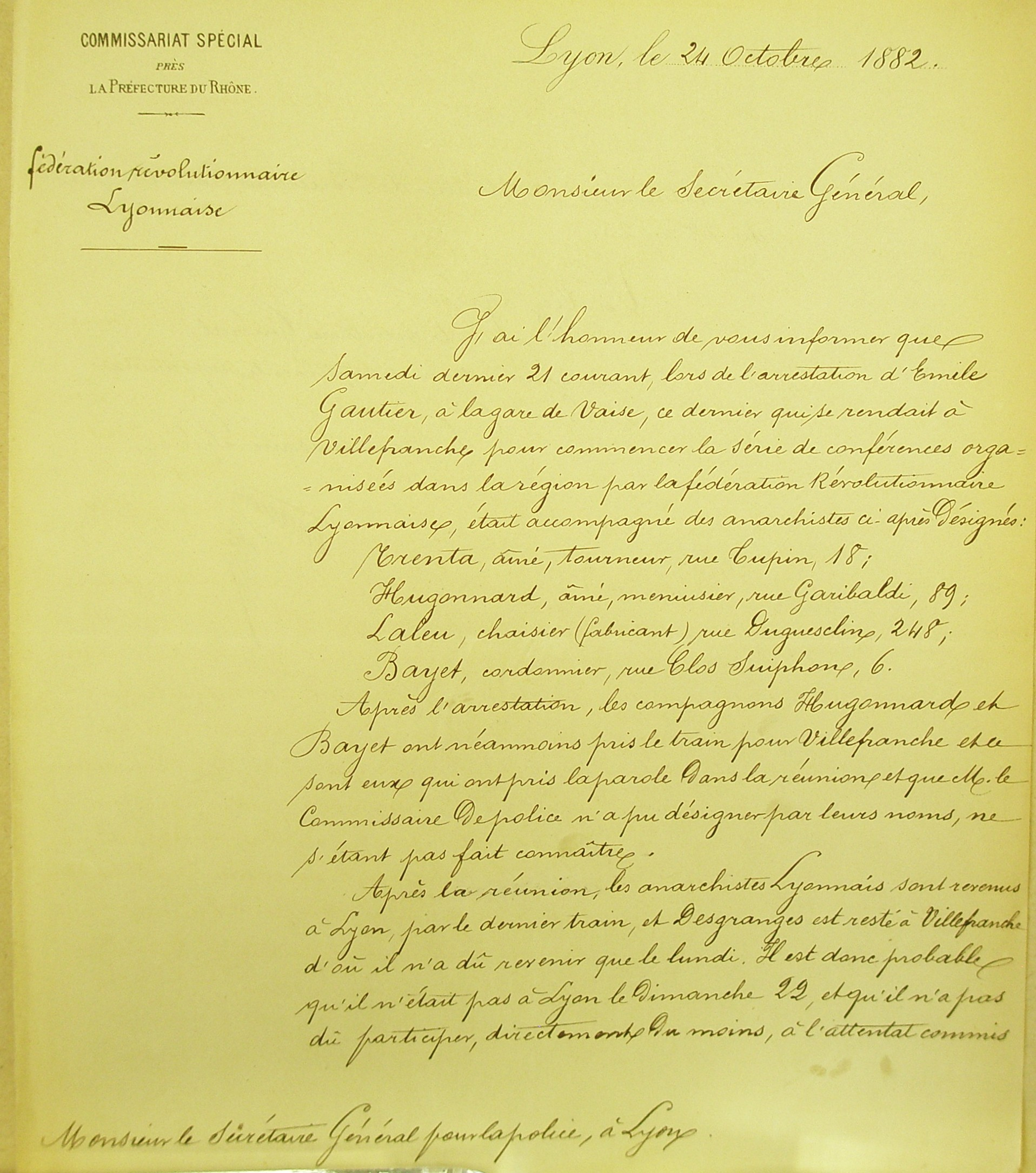
Report on Hugonnard's travel to Villefranche to replace Émile Gautier (collections of Archives anarchistes)

On 15 October 1881, he was reported as attending a private meeting of the Federation held at the Salle de l’Élisée in the Guillotière district. The hall was 'decorated with twelve red flags and one black flag with white fringes'. This meeting, which he attended alongside Bordat, Henri Boriasse, and Joseph Bernard, was dedicated to the Tunisian question and drew approximately 350 people.

In 1882, during the Montceau-les-Mines troubles and following the Assommoir bombing, Hugonnard was arrested and imprisoned along with Gleizal, Pinoy, Giraudon, and twenty-five other companions. During the Trial of the 66, he was accused of belonging to the International, which had allegedly not disappeared and was then prohibited by the Dufaure Law of 1872.

In January 1883, when the court reached its decision regarding him, he was placed in the least responsible category of all those convicted. The judge relied specifically on the fact that he had represented the Lyon Revolutionary Federation at an anarchist conference held in Villefranche-sur-Saône, alongside companion Jean Baguet (known as Bayet). According to the authorities, he had been in the company of Émile Gautier, who was arrested before his eyes at the Vaise train station, and Hugonnard reportedly decided to take his place. His initial sentence was six months in prison, a fifty-franc fine, and five years' loss of civic rights.

Hugonnard was subsequently part of the appeal heard in March 1883 for the Trial of the 66. He denied having been a member of the Federation in question, but the judge maintained that his membership was proven by his involvement in certain titles of the first period of the Lyon anarchist press, such as Le Droit social, in which he was a shareholder. His sentence was therefore upheld.

The anarchist then moved to Switzerland with his family and settled in Geneva, where he worked as a carpenter at 12 rue des Gares. Around late 1883, he was reported as a member of a group called Les Justiciers, which included other co-defendants from the Trial of the 66, such as Philippe Sanlaville.

Having returned to Lyon in 1887 and settled at 7 rue Fournet, Hugonnard was a member of the Groupe de la Guillotière et des Brotteaux, which historian Rolf Dupuy describes as 'the most important of the Lyon anarchist groups created in early 1890'. In 1890, he also participated in the Geneva Congress led by several regional groups that established an International Federation of Proletarian Demands. Companion Octave Jahn was another notable delegate at this congress.

At the beginning of the Ère des attentats (1892–1894), Hugonnard was 'preventively arrested' before 1 May 1892. His sister Louise, who was also accused of criminal association against persons and property, was left free. He was released about a week later.

He died on 9 November 1903 in Lyon.

== Primary sources ==
=== Published documents ===
- Sentence of the French authorities against him at the Trial of the 66, Lyon Criminal Court, 19 January 1883 (in French)
- Sentence of the French authorities against him in his appeal request at the Trial of the 66, Lyon AppealsCourt, 13 March 1883 (in French)

=== Police sources and various archives ===
Collection from the archive-site Archives Anarchistes published on Commons and including, especially from the Rhône archives:

- Files concerning the Trial of the 66: 4 M 308, 2 U 433, 2 U 434, 2 U 435 (comprising thousands of pages)
- Files concerning anarchist activities in the Rhône department during the 1880s–1890s: 4 M 307 (1), 4 M 307 (2), 4 M 308, 4 M 310, 4 M 312 (1), 4 M 312 (2) (comprising thousands of pages)
- File concerning the 1890 Geneva Congress in which he reportedly participated: 4 M 310 (35 pages)

== Bibliography ==
- Dupuy, Rolf (2024), "HUGONNARD Émile, dit Michel", Dictionnaire des anarchistes (Le Maitron), Paris: Le Maitron des anarchistes
- Dupuy, Rolf (2025), "HUGONNARD, Émile "Michel"", Dictionnaire international des militants anarchistes, Paris
