= Jacques Zuida =

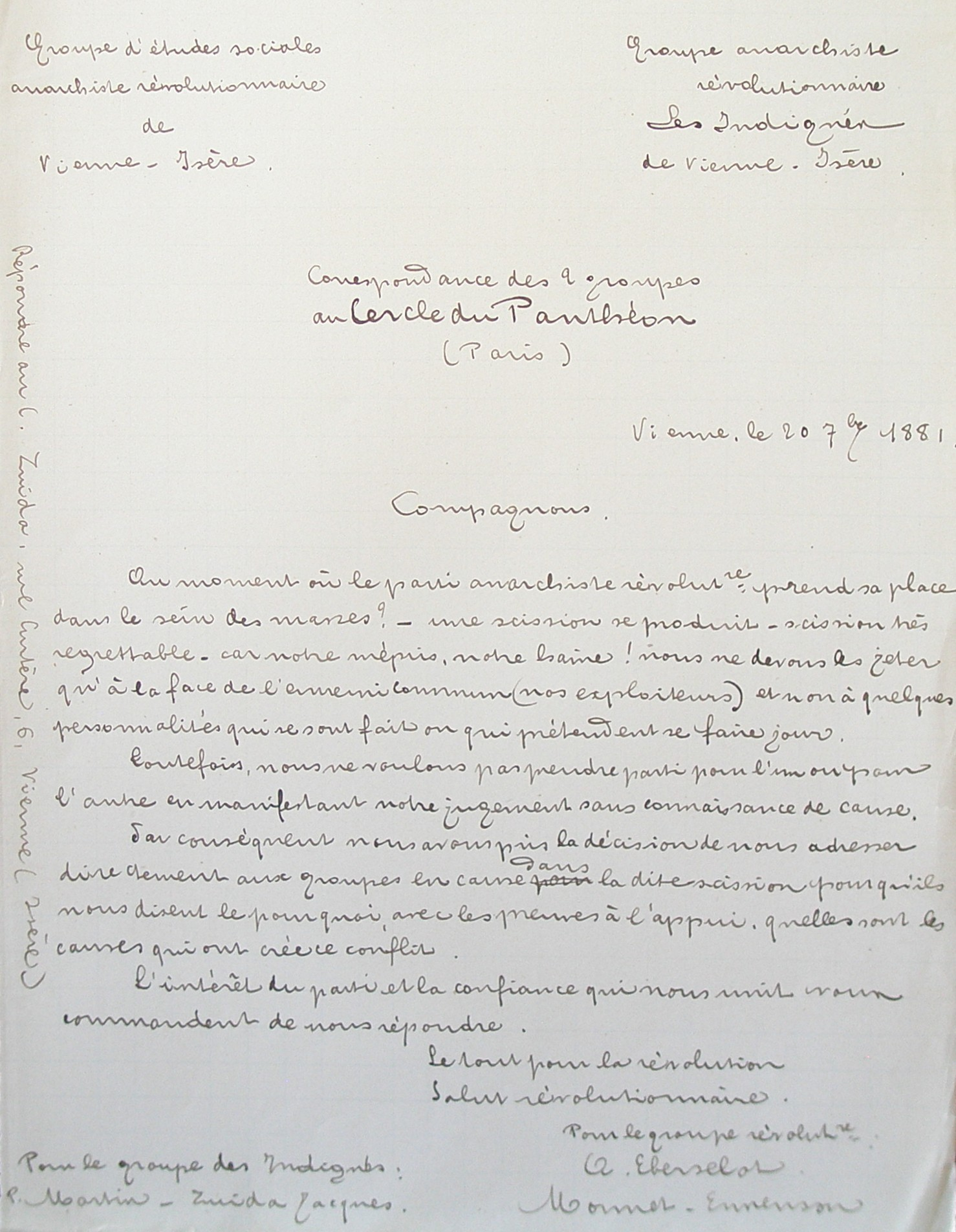
- Letter by the Vienne anarchist groups to Paris (collection of Archives anarchistes)
- Born: Jacques Zuida; June 19, 1839; Bischwiller
- Died: March 15, 1908 (aged 68); Lyon
- Citizenship: France (opted 1872)
- Occupations: Weaver, wine merchant
- Known for: Organizer of the group Les Indignés; defendant in the Trial of the 66; contributor to Le Droit social and L'Étendard révolutionnaire
- Movement: Anarchism
- Spouse: Louise Exertier (m. 1860s)

Jacques Zuida (June 19, 1839 - March 15, 1908) was a French weaver, wine merchant, and anarchist. He played a notable role in the establishment of the anarchist movement in Vienne, Isère, beginning in the second half of the 1870s, there, he organized the anarchist group Les Indignés ('The Indignated') and was targeted and convicted for membership in the Black International during the Trial of the 66.

Born in Bischwiller and later moving to Vienne, he enlisted as a volunteer in the French troops during the Franco-Prussian War (1871). Zuida gradually drifted toward anarchism over the following decade and, between 1880 and 1882, participated in the first period of the Lyon anarchist press. Following the Montceau-les-Mines troubles and the Assommoir bombing, he was arrested and brought to trial for belonging to Les Indignés, a group alleged to have endorsed the London Congress. Zuida denied belonging to the Black International, though he admitted to being a member of the group, and declared that he had been an anarchist and would remain one even after his conviction. He was sentenced to fifteen months in prison, a 200-franc fine, and five years' deprivation of civic, civil, and family rights. Zuida did not appeal.

Following his release, the Alsatian continued his activism and was targeted during the repression of early 1894. He died in 1908 in Lyon.

== Biography ==
=== Youth and Franco-Prussian War ===
Jacques Zuida was born on 19 June 1839 in Bischwiller, Bas-Rhin, into a family from Mannheim and, likely prior to that, from Holland. His mother’s name was Marie Madelaine Strohl and his father was his namesake.

He married Louise Exertier, six years his junior, in the second half of the 1860s. He left Bischwiller with his family and his wife, moving to Vienne, where they settled and where he found employment as a weaver. For historians Rolf Dupuy and CEP, his trajectory recalls that of the Ebersold family, who hailed from the same town and followed the same route to settle in Vienne; it is possible that the two families knew each other and socialized during this period, before Auguste Ebersold and Jacques Zuida became anarchists.

Their daughter, Louise Anne, was born in May 1869 in Vienne, and died there on 18 April 1870 at the age of eleven months.

Zuida, who had contributed to a patriotic subscription for the army's wounded in August, enlisted as a volunteer in a corps franc during the Franco-Prussian War. There, he carried out reconnaissance missions behind Prussian lines.

Another of his daughters, Marie Jeanne, was born in Vienne during the Commune, on 19 April 1871. The Zuida family (Jacques and other family members) opted for French nationality in 1872.

=== Socialism and joining the anarchist movement (1879? - 1882) ===
Between 1879 and 1880, he contributed to several subscription lists in Le Prolétaire, most of them in support of the newspaper and one for the paper's treasurer, Maget, who had been struck by an eye disease that left him blind. In the earliest police reports concerning him, the authorities were uncertain about his origins, suspecting him to be Italian.

In 1880, he was a member of the anarchist group Les Indignés ('The Indignated') in Vienne alongside Pierre Martin, Fages, and Sala. Another parallel group, the Anarchist Revolutionary Social Studies Group, existed in Vienne during the same period and included, among others, the companions Ebersold and Monnet. According to the two historians, both groups appear to have maintained friendly relations, or even to have relatively been merged, and they jointly wrote a letter to the Parisian Panthéon Circle on 20 September 1881.

In this joint letter, which Zuida and Martin signed on behalf of Les Indignés, the two groups sought information regarding the particulars of an internal crisis then unfolding within the movement in Paris. At that time, alongside Martin, he was responsible for the group's correspondence with the Revolutionary Federation of the East and was residing at 6 rue Cuvière in Lyon.

In 1882, Zuida contributed to the newspaper Le Droit social, where Les Indignés published several texts. Alongside Martin, E. Monnet, Charles Jourdy, Ebersoldt, and Sala, he subscribed to an 'honorary revolver' to be awarded to any worker who followed the example of Pierre Fournier, who was then on trial after shooting his boss in Roanne.

Following the banning of Le Droit social, he continued to correspond with L’Étendard révolutionnaire, the successor to the first title, both papers were closely linked to the Lyonnese Révolutionary Federation, according to Bordat, and Zuida corresponded with several members of this Federation.

=== 1882-1883 : Accusations of being part of the Black International and sentence at the Trial of the 66 ===
Meanwhile, the situation in Lyon and the region became increasingly unstable during the summer of 1882, with the insurrection launched by the Bande noire in Montceau-les-Mines (15 August 1882), then the Assommoir bombing in Lyon (October 1882), each of these events reacting to and leading to new waves of repression. He was raided and arrested on 7 December 1882.

This repressive wave culminated in January 1883 in the Trial of the 66. The anarchists involved in the trial, including Kropotkin, Bordat, Bernard, Tressaud, and others, were accused of belonging to the International refounded at the London Congress, which had adopted a program of propaganda by the deed; also known as the Black International.

During the trial, he answered the questions, maintaining that while he did indeed belong to the group Les Indignés, he held no ties to nor knew any anarchists in neighboring towns, a position that proved difficult to defend once letters signed by his own hand to other groups were produced. The prosecutor questioned him on the reason for his disappearance from Vienne in early August 1882, which coincided with the International Congress in Geneva. He initially claimed to have gone to meet his cousin in Lyon, but when the latter stated he had not seen him during that period, Zuida responded by saying he had forgotten what he had done, that is, that he would have remained in Vienne.

However, as he had not participated in the private meetings with Kropotkin and Reclus, who had each visited Martin in turn, his potential connections appeared less obvious. He admitted to having chaired an anarchist meeting in Vienne featuring speakers from elsewhere but declared that, given his hearing problems, he had been unable to properly hear what had been said.

He was a signatory of the anarchist declaration read by the companion Tressaud during the trial, along with forty-five others. During his defense, in which he spoke last after Martin, Zuida declared that the International in question was an organization that 'did not exist'; he then defended the anarchists against the prosecutor's accusations of cowardice and anti-patriotism by speaking of his voluntary enlistment for France during the Franco-Prussian War, despite being Alsatian himself, concluding this part by declaring:

If everyone had done their duty, sir, Alsace would not, today, be part of the Prussian monarchy.

He concluded his defense by asserting that he was 'an anarchist yesterday, today, and would be tomorrow'. Placed in the second category (out of 7) in terms of the severity of the charges, Martin being placed in the sixth, Zuida was sentenced in the first instance of the Trial of the Sixty-Six, on 19 January 1883, to fifteen months in prison, a 200-franc fine, and five years' deprivation of civic, civil, and family rights.

The judge justified this decision by arguing that the ties between Martin, Kropotkin, and Reclus supported the assessment that Les Indignés had endorsed the London Congress; regarding Zuida specifically, he noted that he had admitted to signing several notes in Le Droit social and L’Étendard révolutionnaire and had himself confessed to being a member of that group.

He did not appeal his sentence and was therefore not represented at the appeal trial (March 1883).

=== Later activities within the movement and death ===
In early 1887, Zuida was residing at 8 rue Cuvier and appeared on a list of anarchists from Vienne, where he was described as a 'man of action'.

Until 1893, his name appeared regularly in police reports from Grenoble and Vienne. At that time, he ran a wine shop at 47 rue Victor Faugier, which served as a meeting place for the companions of Vienne. On 1 January 1894, like several other anarchists in Vienne, he was the subject of a police raid, and in May, he hosted the companion Ferdinand Plantelin at his home for a time.

Jacques Zuida died on 15 March 1908 in Lyon.

== Bibliography ==
- Dupuy, Rolf; CEP (2026), "ZUIDA, Jacques", Dictionnaire international des militants anarchistes, Paris

As of this edit, this article uses content from "ZUIDA, Jacques", authored by Dupuy, Rolf; CEP, which is licensed in a way that permits reuse under the Creative Commons Attribution-ShareAlike 3.0 Unported License, but not under the GFDL. All relevant terms must be followed.
