= Auguste Ebersold =

French mechanic, printer, and anarchist (born 1860)

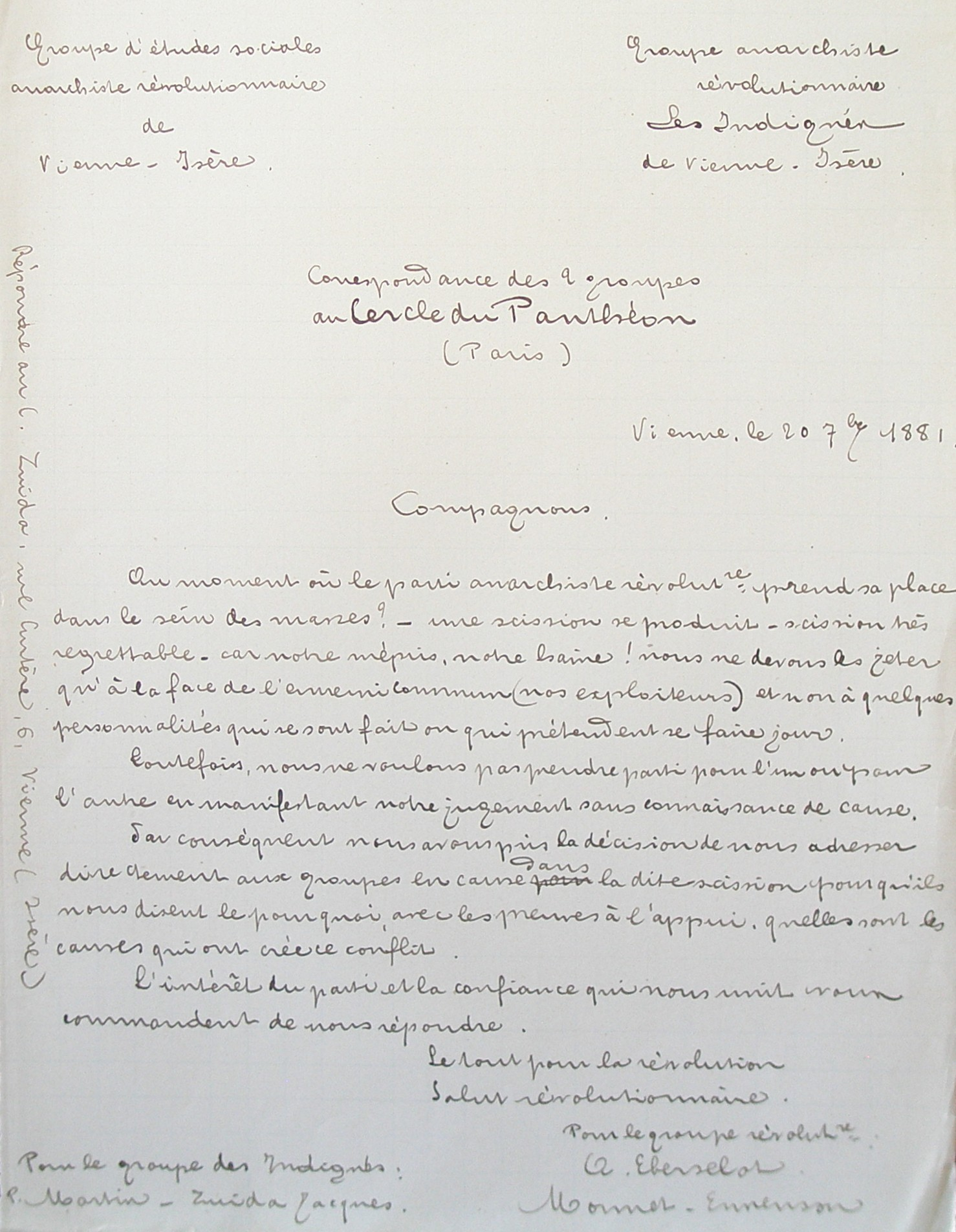
- Letter by the Vienne anarchist groups to Paris (collection of Archives anarchistes)
- Born: Auguste Ebersold; February 5, 1860; Bischwiller, France
- Other name: Ebersolay
- Citizenship: France (opted 1872)
- Occupations: Mechanic, printer
- Known for: Organizer of the group Les Indignés; defendant in the Trial of the 66; contributor to Le Droit social
- Movement: Anarchism; Alsatian nationalism (later years)
- Spouse(s): Malvina Guérin (m. 1890); J. Chardon; L. Bridoux (m. 1912)

Auguste Ebersold (1860 - ?), also known by his pseudonym Ebersolay, was a French mechanic, printer, and anarchist. A key figure in the establishment of the anarchist movement in Isère, France, where he organized the Revolutionary anarchist social studies group of Vienne, he managed to flee during the raids leading up to the Trial of the 66. There, he was accused and severely sentenced for membership in the Black International.

Born in Alsace, Ebersold and his family moved to Isère following the defeat in the Franco-Prussian War, settling in Vienne. There, the young man joined the burgeoning anarchist movement in France and organized the Revolutionary anarchist social studies group of Vienne group. This group participated in the first period of the Lyon anarchist press and was accused of subscribing to the decisions of the London Congress (1881), thereby belonging to the Black International. He successfully escaped the raids that followed the Montceau-les-Mines troubles and the Assommoir bombing, yet received one of the heaviest sentences of the Trial of the 66, being ranked alongside prominent figures such as Toussaint Bordat and Peter Kropotkin.

Ebersold continued his political activities over the following decades before undergoing a political shift starting in 1905 toward anti-German Alsatian nationalism.

== Biography ==
=== Youth and move after the Franco-Prussian War (1870) ===
Auguste Ebersold was born on 5 February 1860 in Bischwiller, France. He was the son of Catherine Vogt and Abraham Ebersold. The family lived on Rue de la Pomme-d’Or in that commune at the end of the 1860s.

Ebersold moved to Vienne, Isère, before 1872, when he opted for French nationality there. For historians Rolf Dupuy and CEP, his trajectory recalls that of the Zuida family, who originated from the same town and followed the same path to settle in Vienne: it is possible that the two families knew each other and socialized during this period, before Auguste Ebersold and Jacques Zuida became anarchists.

=== Late 1870s-early 1880s : integration within the anarchist movement ===
In 1880, he was a member of the Revolutionary anarchist social studies group of Vienne along with Monnet. Another parallel group, the Indignés ('Indignated'), existed during the same period in Vienne and included, among others, the companions Zuida and Martin.

According to the two historians, both groups appear to have maintained friendly relations, or even to have relatively been merged, and they jointly wrote a letter to the Parisian Panthéon Circle on 20 September 1881. In this joint letter, which Ebersold and Monnet signed for the Revolutionary anarchist social studies group of Vienne, the two groups sought information on the ins and outs of an internal crisis within the movement then underway in Paris.

He had a brother who was also a member of the Indignés group. According to Dupuy, this may have been Jacques Ebersold, born around 1865, a weaver who, in early 1887, was reported as 'at large' after being sentenced to 2 years in prison. He was also a member of the Revolutionary Federation of the East, which covered most of the anarchists in the region during this period, and he resided with his mother, his father having died in the meantime.

In 1882, Ebersold collaborated to the first period of Lyonnese anarchist press, notably for the newspaper Le Droit social, where he published several texts on behalf of the Indignés and the 'Viennese revolutionaries', including one signed with the pseudonym 'A. Ebersolay' (No. 15 of 21 May 1882). In this same title, alongside the anarchist companions Martin, E. Monnet, Charles Jourdy, and Sala, he subscribed to a 'revolver of honor' for the worker who would imitate Pierre Fournier, who was on trial after shooting his boss in Roanne.

=== 1882-1883 : Accusations of being part of the Black International and harsh sentence at the Trial of the 66 ===
Meanwhile, the situation in Lyon and the region became increasingly unstable during the summer of 1882, with the insurrection launched by the Bande noire in Montceau-les-Mines (15 August 1882), then the Assommoir bombing in Lyon (October 1882), each of these events reacting to and leading to new waves of repression. When the Viennese anarchists' homes were raided and they were arrested in early December 1882, the police found only his family, who informed them that Ebersold had left the city for an unknown destination a few days earlier, likely crossing into Switzerland.

This repressive wave culminated in January 1883 in the Trial of the 66. The anarchists involved in the trial, including Kropotkin, Bordat, Bernard, Tressaud, and others, were accused of belonging to the International refounded at the London Congress, which had adopted a program of propaganda by the deed; also known as the Black International. Given that Ebersold was a fugitive, he was not represented or defended at the trial.

Placed in the second category (out of 7) in terms of the gravity of the charges of which they were accused, Ebersold was sentenced in the first instance of the Trial of the Sixty-Six, on 19 January 1883, to five years in prison, a 2,000 francs fine, ten years of deprivation of civic, civil, and family rights, and ten years of high-police surveillance.

The judge argued for this decision by maintaining that the Indignés group would have had subscribed to the London Congress, on Ebersold specifically, he noted that he had organized a conference in Vienne where Bordat had spoken and that he had signed several seized letters as 'secretary of the Indignés'. According to CEP and Dupuy, his sentence was notably harsh, being equal to that of the anarchist 'figures' placed in the seventh category, such as Kropotkin or Bordat.

As a fugitive, he did not appeal his sentence and was therefore not represented at the appeal trial (March 1883). Ebersold then reached Belgium, from which he was expelled in the autumn of 1883.

=== Following years as an anarchist (1890s-1900s) ===
He married Malvina Guérin on 4 October 1890 in Vienne. On 14 September 1891, the couple had a daughter, Marcelle Ebersold. Guérin died three years later, with Ebersold reporting her death at the town hall. Later, he married the 'widow Garin, born J. Chardon'.

In 1901, he ran a printing house in Vienne and was the printer for the newspaper Le Flambeau, managed by Georges Butaud.

=== Switch to patriotism (1905-1910s ?) ===
Between 1905 and at least 1915, Ebersold, who then resided at 9 Rue Marchande in Vienne, was the secretary of a patriotic and nationalist society of Alsatians settled in Vienne. He sang at certain gatherings, collected funds, etc.

His wife having died in 1911, Ebersold remarried in May 1912 in Vienne to L. Bridoux: she worked as a bookseller and he continued as a printer.

== Bibliography ==
- Dupuy, Rolf; CEP (2026), "EBERSOLD, Auguste [dit "EBERSOLDT", "Ebersolay"]", Dictionnaire international des militants anarchistes, Paris

As of this edit, this article uses content from "EBERSOLD, Auguste [dit "EBERSOLDT", "Ebersolay""], authored by Dupuy, Rolf; CEP, which is licensed in a way that permits reuse under the Creative Commons Attribution-ShareAlike 3.0 Unported License, but not under the GFDL. All relevant terms must be followed.
