= Philippe Sanlaville =

- Born: Philippe Sanlaville; December 14, 1851; Beaujeu, France
- Died: June 25, 1910 (aged 58); Voiron, France
- Citizenship: France
- Occupations: Shoemaker, watchmaker
- Known for: Founding the group Le Glaive; defendant in the Trial of the 66; manager of L'Insurgé
- Height: 163 cm (5 ft 4 in)
- Movement: Anarchism
- Spouse: Clotilde Cinquin (m. 1910)

Philippe Sanlaville (14 December 1851 – 25 June 1910) was a French anarchist shoemaker and watchmaker. A notable figure in the socialist and then anarchist movement, he organized the group Le Glaive ('The Sword') in Villefranche-sur-Saône and is best known for being targeted and convicted as part of the Black International during the Trial of the 66.

Born into a poor family and fatherless by the age of six, he became a prominent figure in the birth of the socialist movement in France, participating in the country's first two workers' congresses as a delegate for the workers of Lyon. He was one of the primary actors in the founding of the Lyon workers' party, which he sought to steer toward anarchism. Following the London Congress (1881), he moved to Villefranche-sur-Saône and established the group Le Glaive. He also led several initiatives in support of the rebels of the Montceau-les-Mines troubles. Following the raids after the Assommoir bombing, he was arrested, his home was raided, and he was accused of having been part of this International during the Trial of the 66. He responded by stating he had never been part of a single anarchist group and did not belong to such an organization. Convicted in the first instance, his sentence was reduced on appeal. Following his release, the police executed a political maneuver to have him arrested again on dubious charges.

Sanlaville distanced himself from the anarchist movement for a time before returning to it in the early 1890s, when he took over the management of the Lyon anarchist newspaper L'Insurgé, was targeted by the repression of early 1894, and became involved in multiple initiatives. He died in 1910.

== Biography ==
=== Youth ===
Philippe Sanlaville was born on 14 December 1851 in Beaujeu, in the department of Rhône. He was the son of Marguerite Jacquet, who had no profession, and Claude Sanlaville, a day laborer. His father died when he was only six years old, leaving his mother to care for him alone. He was described as having blue eyes and chestnut hair.

In 1871, he was exempted from military service as the only son of a widow.

=== Figure of the socialist movement becoming an actor in the split between anarchists and socialists ===
In 1876, while residing on Rue Tronchet in Lyon, Sanlaville was elected and mandated as a delegate of the Lyon workers to the first workers' congress in French history, the Paris Congress. He was mandated again two years later during the second workers' congress in French history, the Lyon Congress. During this second congress, he was one of the primary supporters and founders of the workers' party affiliated with the Federation of the Socialist Workers of France (FTSF).

In this context, he presided over the local congress held at Croix-Rousse in February 1880, which marked the birth of the Lyon Socialist Workers' Party, affiliated with the FTSF. In July of the same year, he was mandated by the watchmakers of Besançon to bring their demands to the founding congress of the Revolutionary Federation of the East. He then held notable positions within this organization and its propaganda commission.

However, relations within the FTSF, and particularly within the Lyon Workers' Party, became strained between the proponents of anarchism, such as Sanlaville or Toussaint Bordat, and those of reformist socialism.

On 9 February 1881, Sanlaville and Bernard created an abstentionist faction of the Workers' Party and decided to liquidate the old organization. The split between the two groups was finalized. In June, Sanlaville and Bordat attempted to win over the Saint-Étienne congress but were unsuccessful. Faced with a complex situation, they decided to contact Peter Kropotkin and ask him to represent their organization, the Lyon Revolutionary Federation, at the London Congress, which he ultimately did.

=== Settlement in Villefranche ===
Following the London Congress, Sanlaville moved and settled in Villefranche-sur-Saône, where he participated in the founding of the group Le Glaive ('The Sword'). In 1882, he contributed to a subscription organized during the first period of the Lyon anarchist press to offer a revolver of honor to the anarchist Pierre Fournier, who had just shot his boss.

He intervened in L'Étendard révolutionnaire in August of the same year to protest the conviction of companions Bonthoux and Crestin, managers of Le Droit social.

In parallel with these biographical events, the Montceau-les-Mines troubles began, affecting the Saône-et-Loire coal basin and the overall region. On 22 October 1882, he presided over a meeting organized in the presence of Hugonnard and other anarchists from Lyon, where approximately 800 attendees expressed solidarity and support for the Montceau-les-Mines rebels.

Following the Assommoir bombing (October 1882) in Lyon, he participated in a private meeting of Federation figures held at Bordat's home, alongside Genet, Ricard, Pautet, Sourrisseau, Chatard, Boriasse, Bayet, Courtois, and Berlioz Arthaud. During this meeting, the participants decided to create a support fund to relaunch L'Étendard révolutionnaire, which had been affected by repression.

=== Trial of the 66 ===
He was arrested in the anarchist raids following the bombing and accused of belonging to the International refounded at the London Congress, which had adopted a program of propaganda by the deed; also known as the Black International. During the raid at his home, police found a copy of Le Révolté and Kropotkin's pamphlets To the Young and The Spirit of Revolt.

During the interrogations preceding the trial, he denied belonging to any anarchist group, including Le Glaive, stating that nothing could prove such participation and refusing to sign the interrogation reports. He was a signatory of the Declaration of the Anarchists read by companion Tressaud at the trial. Challenged by the prosecutor as an 'influential member of the anarchist party', he replied:

I do not know if I am an influential member, but all I can say is that I have done for the party everything that was possible for me to do.

Sanlaville stated he was very surprised to have been implicated for affiliation with this International. He remained brief in his defense, positioned between Liégeon and Peilhon, maintaining among other things:

I have propagated, as much as possible, socialist ideas, especially the idea of the transformation of individual property into common property.

Placed in the second category (out of 7) in terms of guilt for the charges brought against them, Sanlaville was sentenced on 19 January 1883 to fifteen months in prison, a 200 francs fine, and five years of deprivation of civic, civil, and family rights. The judge argued this decision by maintaining that Sanlaville acknowledged participating in a private meeting of the Lyon Federation regarding Le Droit social and that his role within the group Le Glaive, in frequent contact with this federation, was established.

On appeal, he maintained the same line of defense. On 13 March 1883, the second judge also considered it established that the group Le Glaive belonged to this reconstituted International, but reduced Sanlaville's sentence to eight months in prison, a 50 francs fine, and five years of deprivation of civil rights.

Upon his release on 19 September 1883, he resumed his activities. He was then living in Lyon at 1 Rue Saint-Jean. At the end of 1883, according to the police, he was a member of the group Les Justiciers ('The Justicers'), which included Champal, Hugonnard, Fabre, and Sourisseau (former co-defendants from the Trial of the 66).

Sanlaville was arrested on 7 June 1884 for being unable to pay the fines related to the Trial of the 66. In a report concerning him, the special commissaire of the Rhône expressed satisfaction with his incarceration and announced that other recently released anarchists, Bardoux, Bayet, Bonnet, and Fabre, should also be arrested. This police maneuver was intended to 'instill a salutary fear' in those who, once released, 'nevertheless have a more correct attitude and refrain from making themselves conspicuous'. They were all arrested between June and July 1884, with the prosecutor attempting to have them sentenced to two years in prison. They were given the minimum sentence (1 year) and, being unable to pay, had to be released halfway through the term. Sanlaville was released on 7 December 1884.

=== Return to the anarchist movement in the early 1890s ===
Following a period where he appeared to step back from the Lyon anarchist movement, Sanlaville returned to it in the early 1890s. At that time, he resided at 26 Rue Tramassacre.

In 1893, he was subject to legal proceedings for speaking at a meeting organized in Lyon for May Day. On 26 June, he was appointed treasurer of the Lyon anarchist organization formed during a meeting. Then, starting from 2 September of the same year, he succeeded L. J. Jacome as the manager of the regional anarchist-communist organ, L'Insurgé, of which he had previously been a member of the editorial control commission alongside Lombard, Camberousse, Dumortier, and Polo. In the first issue under his management (No. 4), Séverine published a poem.

In September, he gave a lecture in Saint-Claude, where he defended imprisoned and persecuted anarchists and countered the accusations leveled against them by the conservative press and authorities. On 20 November, Sanlaville was the subject of a raid where police seized a large number of anarchist newspapers, writings, and pamphlets.

Sanlaville was raided on the very first day of the repression of early 1894, during the arrests and raids of 1 January, along with about fifty other anarchists in the region. The police seized a large number of French and foreign anarchist newspapers as well as correspondence from his home. He was then prosecuted with 9 other companions, including Comberousse, Boget, Condom, Souchon, for criminal association within the framework of the French state's new repressive apparatus against anarchists (the passage of the first two lois scélérates in December 1893).

On 20 February 1894, like eleven other activists, he was the subject of another raid and was arrested. Following the assassination of Sadi Carnot, he was briefly mentioned by the authorities and the press because his newspaper was found in numerous raids on anarchists in Lyon, and also because Sante Caserio had published a communication in L'Insurgé (No. 11 of 23 October 1893) asking for news of Tiburce Straggioti from Sète.

In July 1897, he spoke with companion Mondon during a conference led by Henri Dhorr in Bourgoin-Jallieu. Sanlaville delivered an anti-clerical speech during this gathering.

=== Last years and death ===
In early 1904, Les Temps nouveaux reported that Sanlaville was in a 'sad situation' and, as the newspaper's aid and relief fund was 'dry', called on companions to send sums that could be forwarded to him.

In February 1906, in the columns of Le Libertaire, he called on revolutionary comrades in Voiron, of all schools, to join the section of the Anti-national Antimilitarist Association (AIA) that had just been founded there.

On 23 March 1910, he married Clotilde Cinquin in Voiron. Sanlaville died there approximately three months later, on 25 June 1910.

== Bibliography ==
- Dupuy, Rolf (2014), SANLAVILLE Philippe, Paris: Le Maitron
- Dupuy, Rolf; CEP (2026), "SANLAVILLE, Philippe", Dictionnaire international des militants anarchistes, Paris
