= Trial of the 66 =

1883 French political trial

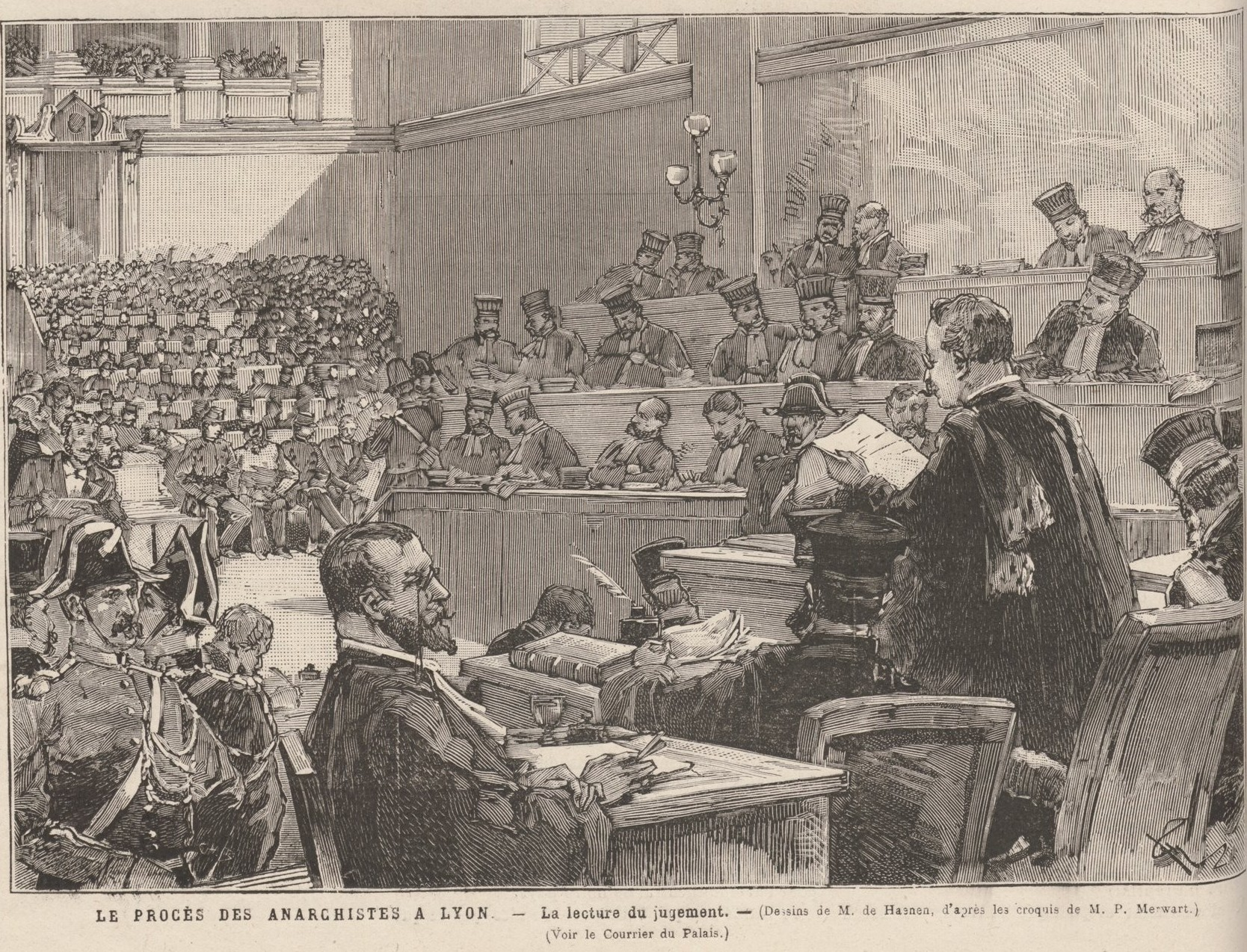
- The Trial of the 66 in Le Monde illustré of 27 January 1883
- Court: Tribunal correctionnel de Lyon
- Full case name: Case of the anarchists affiliated with an International Revolutionary Association. (Law of 14 March 1872.)
- Decided: January 19, 1883
- Verdict: Most of the accused found guilty on all counts (except 5 acquitted); Bernard, Bordat, Gautier and Kropotkin sentenced to the maximum
- Charge: Conspiracy; Affiliation with an international association of workers or an international organization whose aim is to incite the suspension of work, the abolition of the right to property, the family, the motherland, religion, or the free exercise of worship.

Court membership
- Chief judge: Mr. Jacomet
- Associate judges: Mr. Dieu-Labrasserie, Groz and Vallet

The Trial of the 66, also known as the Great Trial of the Anarchists (French: Grand procès des anarchistes), was a French political trial held in January 1883 against dozens of anarchists accused and sentenced for participating in the Black International. As a significant episode of repression against the anarchist movement, which was then in the process of formation and growth, the trial sought to decapitate the movement's structure in France, with very limited success.

Since the crushing of the Paris Commune during the Bloody Week and the banning of the Anti-authoritarian International (1872–1881) in the country and elsewhere, anarchists had been gradually evolving by adopting new strategies, such as the use of propaganda of the deed, and growing in numbers. In 1881, at the London Congress, a number of them supported the refounding of the International on anti-organizational and insurrectional principles, giving birth to the Black International. Peter Kropotkin, in connection with the Lyon Revolutionary Federation, subsequently undertook several trips across France, where he visited various groups and individuals. At the same time, the situation in France became increasingly unstable for the State, with the activities of the Black Band in Saône-et-Loire during the Montceau-les-Mines troubles, followed by the Assommoir bombing. The French State reacted with great violence, arresting dozens of anarchists and accusing them, during the trial held in early 1883, of belonging to this International, using various types of evidence, most notably the anarchist press itself.

For their part, the accused anarchists maintained that these allegations were false and that the trial was primarily intended to destroy the anarchist movement. Among them, Kropotkin, Toussaint Bordat, Joseph Bernard, and Émile Gautier were the primary figures the justice system sought to imprison. Almost all were convicted, eventually leading to the demonstration of 9 March 1883, followed by their appeal, where the sentences of a certain number were reduced. After their release, French authorities engaged in illegal stratagems aimed at incarcerating some of them once more. Far from marking the death of the anarchist movement in France, this period of repression did not interrupt its growth, a point that several of the accused, including Gautier and Kropotkin, had emphasized during the trial.

== History ==
=== General context: propaganda of the deed, Black International and anarchism in France ===
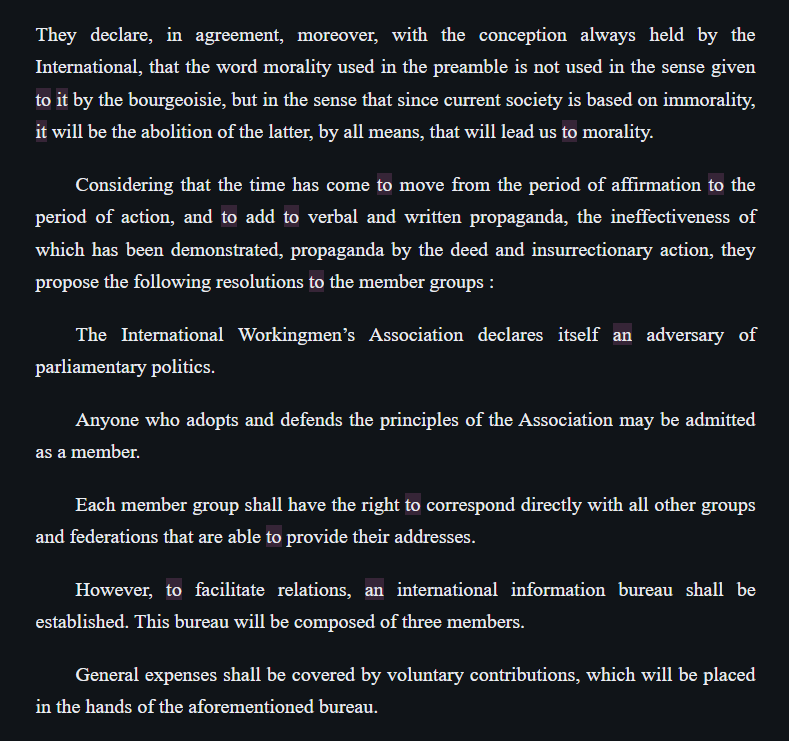
Parts of the resolutions of the London Congress as given by Kropotkin in Le Révolté

Following the crushing of the Communes in France by the nascent French Third Republic and the massacre of the Bloody Week, the emerging anarchist movement faced heavy repression both in France and abroad. In 1872, the Dufaure Law was passed, banning membership in the Anti-authoritarian International (1872–1881), their first and main organization during this period, and punishing any French citizen holding a position within the organization with five years in prison. Moreover, the anarchist movement, which was born roughly at the same time as the French Third Republic, developed a series of strategies and methods of action. One of these, propaganda of the deed, was theorized during the late 1870s. It involved using spectacular actions to incite the people to revolt and spark the revolution. This strategy was extensively debated within the anarchist movement.

In 1881, anarchists from the Anti-authoritarian International and other socialist factions met at the London Congress. There, they voted to re-establish (or perpetuate) the International on a basis that ensured group autonomy. They dissolved all visible structures except for a central correspondence bureau and enshrined propaganda of the deed and the recourse to insurrection as a central aspect of the organization. This marked the birth of what historiography has termed the Black International.

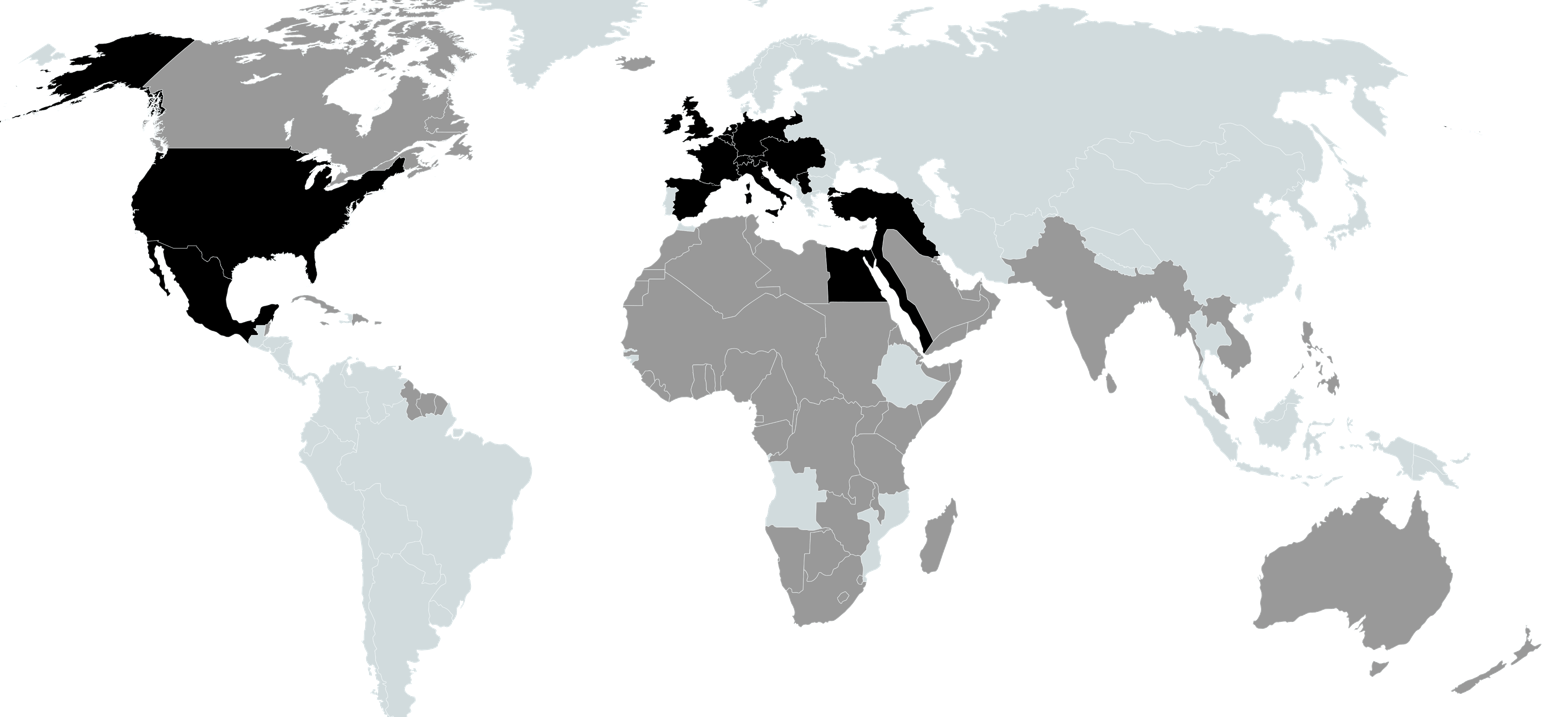
In black, where delegates at the London Congress came from, in grey, what countries were part of the colonial empires of the countries sending delegates

In parallel with these global dynamics, in France, new political events, specifically the amnesty of the Communards (1879–1880) and their return from exile or deportation, were giving fresh momentum to revolutionary and more specifically anarchist circles. According to historian Dominique Petit, the amnesty potentially led anarchists to believe that the State was more reluctant to relaunch a crackdown based on the Dufaure Law of 1872, which had been used at the time to suppress the Commune - explaining why they would have been less keen in hiding the International.

During this period, the anarchist movement was growing rapidly in Lyon and the surrounding regions, aided by the split within the Federation of the Socialist Workers of France (FTSF) between anarchists, such as Toussaint Bordat and Philippe Sanlaville, on one hand, and reformist socialists on the other. It also saw the birth of the first period of the Lyon anarchist press (1882–1884). Peter Kropotkin, who had been the delegate of the Lyon Revolutionary Federation to the London Congress, came back to France, traveled a lot and met several anarchists who were setting up groups, some in private meetings and some in more public ones.

Furthermore, republican paramilitary organizations, such as the Comité de la rue de Grolée in Lyon or the Black Band in Montceau-les-Mines, composed of armed and radical members accustomed to monitoring security forces and possessing networks across the country, gradually evolved toward anarchism and bolstered the anarchist ranks, causing a surge of activity for the movement in this region and deeply penetrating French territory.

=== Raids and arrests for the trial ===
Cities linked with anarchists accused at the trial of the 66 (43 accused came from the Rhône département)

During the year 1882, the situation in France became increasingly unstable, particularly around Lyon and the surrounding regions; the French State and the anarchists moved toward an increasingly confrontational stance, exacerbated by the severe famine affecting the city of Lyon. In the first half of the year, two anarchist workers shot their bosses and were celebrated in the anarchist press. Then, during the summer of 1882, events accelerated with the Black International congress held in Geneva in August, followed the next day by the start of the Montceau-les-Mines troubles. In Lyon itself, these riots and insurrections were met with waves of repression and arrests, as the Lyon Revolutionary Federation was accused of being behind the Black Band. In October, Fanny Madignier and at least two other anarchists carried out the Assommoir bombing to avenge these waves of repression, which in turn led to a new and much more significant crackdown. The arrests and raids took place following the Assommoir bombing and affected hundreds of anarchists across France. These actions were not based on charges related to the bombings themselves, for which the defendants' guilt could be difficult to prove, but rather by reusing the Dufaure Law. At the end, there were 66 accused, and their list was as follows :

Arrested: Louis Bardoux, André Courtois, Joseph Bruyère, François Dejoux, Jean-Marie Dupoizat, Eugène Farges, Louis Landeau, Joseph Trenta, Jules-Hyacinthe Trenta, Félicien Bonnet, Régis Faure, Louis Genet, Antoine Gleyzal (known as Garnier), Emile Hüser, Jacques Peillon, Pierre Pinoy, Michel Sala, Philippe Sanlaville, Charles Voisin, Jacques Zuida, Joseph Genoud, Étienne Faure, Jules Morel, Félix Tressaud, Pierre Michaud, François Pautet, Auguste Blonde, Dominique Crestin, François Péjot, Antoine Desgranges, Jean Ricard, Pierre Martin, Octave Liégeon, Joseph Bernard, Toussaint Bordat, Emile Gautier, Peter Kropotkin, Michel Chavrier, Jean Coindre, Joseph Cottaz, Joseph Damians, Nicolas Didelin, Victor Berlioz-Arthaud, Émile Hugonnard, Charles Sourisseau, Emile Viallet, and Louis Champalle.

In flight: Georges Fabre, Louis Dejoux, Antoine Cyvoct, Henri Borréas, Auguste Ebersold, Georges Garraud (known as Valadier), Jean Baguet (known as Bayet), Joseph Bontoux, Jean-Marie Bourdon, François Chazy, Adolphe Dard, Jean Joly, Jean Renaud, and Emile Maurin.

=== Trial (8-19 January 1883) ===
The trial was held from 8 to 19 January 1883, and was presided over by Judge Jacomet, alongside three other judges named Dieu-Labrasserie, Groz, and Vallet. The prosecutor was Mr. G. Regnault. Most of the defendants did not hire lawyers; the others were defended by maîtres Maillard and Laguerre, of the Paris Bar, and maîtres Arcis, Boutier, Huguet, Minard, Roche, de Leiris, and de Lagrevol, of the Lyon Bar.

==== Accusations levelled against the anarchists ====
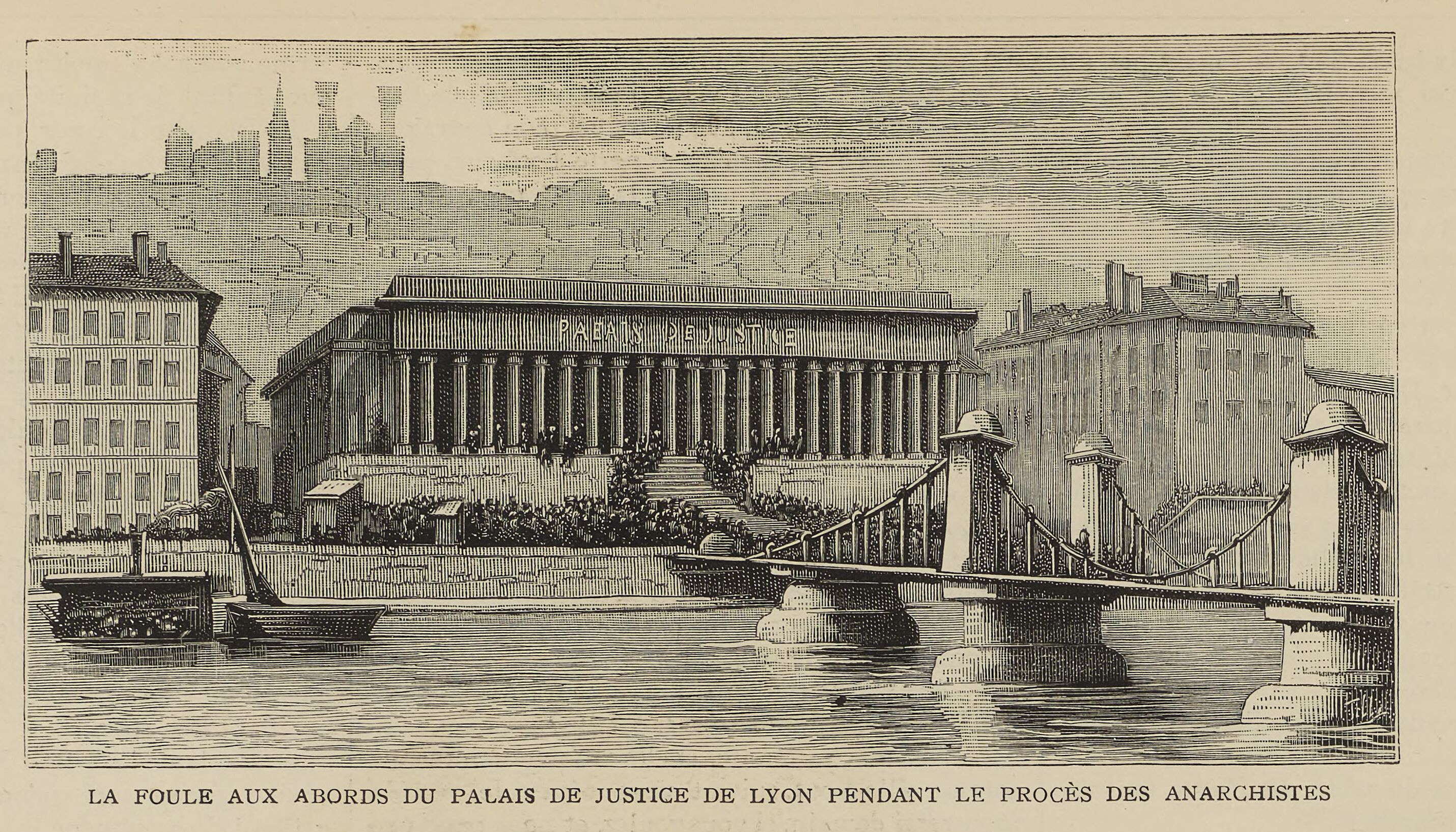
Lyon crowds surrounding the tribunal during the trial in L'Illustration of 27 January 1883

The anarchists indicted during the trial were accused of having participated in the Black International, that is, of having subscribed to the London Congress and thereby participating in the International, which was prohibited under the Dufaure Law. The prosecutor focused heavily on the London Congress, its decisions, its ideology, etc. He sought to prove that the defendants subscribed to this congress, notably by utilizing the anarchist press, including La Révolution sociale, Le Droit social, L’Étendard révolutionnaire, or Le Révolté, a vast array of seized correspondence between the individuals and groups, but also on the official congress proceedings for the London, 4 June 1882 Lausanne and 13-14 August 1882 Geneva Congresses, the manifestos and circulars shared by the groups, the 24 private meetings of the Lyon Federation - in which he had been able to have information through a snitch, according to the anarchists.

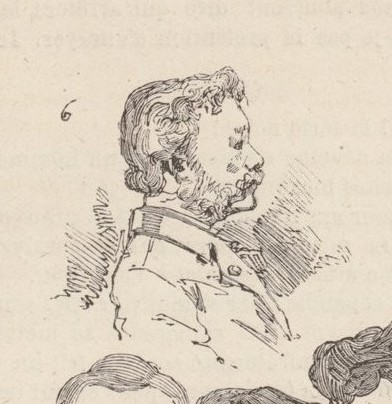
Special police commissaire Perraudin during the trial in Le Monde illustré

Although the indictment did not cover these points, he linked the Assommoir bombing and the Montceau-les-Mines troubles to the influence of both the anarchist press and the Black International, which he accused of having supported these initiatives or to have been behind them. He was helped in his accusations by the special commissaire of the Rhône, Perraudin, who testified for the prosecution and provided a statement in which he said:

The anarchist party originated in Lyon toward the end of 1880. It was following a regional congress of the East, held in Lyon, that the workers' party split into two camps: the voters and the abstentionists. At the head of the latter, initially few in number, was citizen Bernard, a locksmith born in Noyarey (Isère). At the outset, this group, initially of little importance and confined to the districts of La Guillotière and Les Brotteaux, focused on fighting against universal suffrage and spreading agitation among the working masses by means of strikes. Gradually, under Bernard's leadership, these groups developed and expanded to the districts of La Croix-Rousse and Perrache, forming, along with groups from Villefranche, Roanne, and Saint-Etienne, the Revolutionary Federation of the Eastern Region. As of 4 July 1881, the federated groups of Lyon had already attained a certain importance, for at a private general meeting held on that date at Cellerier’s home on Rue Sainte-Elisabeth, approximately 120 members were in attendance. It was during this meeting that, upon the proposal of companions Dejoux and Bernard, Prince Kropotkin was delegated to represent the Lyon Revolutionary Federation at the International Congress of London, which was to open on the 14th of the same month.

In closing his speech, which preceded the final defense statements of the accused, he targeted a few individuals in particular, stating that the court could be lenient toward the others but punish these anarchists severely. These were Peter Kropotkin, 'who was the father of the anarchist idea in Europe'; Émile Gautier, 'who was its apostle in France'; Joseph Bernard, 'who brought about the split of the workers' party in Lyon to found the Lyon Revolutionary Federation' and lastly, Toussaint Bordat, 'who was the organizer of that federation'.

==== Defences of the anarchists ====
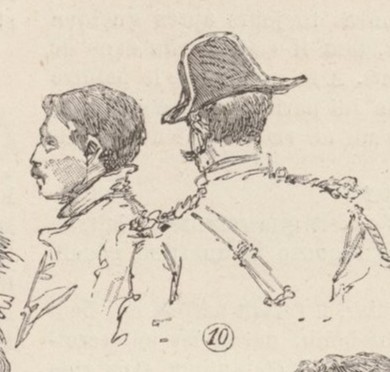
Unknown anarchist during the trial in Le Monde illustré

For their part, the anarchists adopted several lines of defense. They presented the trial as an attack and a form of repression targeting the anarchist movement as a whole, rather than an International that most (though not all) claimed was non-existent or in opposition to their own positions. On these grounds, forty-seven of them (nearly all those appearing in court) co-signed the Declaration of the Anarchists, read by companion Tressaud from Marseille at 4 P. M. during the hearing on 12 January 1883. This declaration, which synthesized anarchist thought and ideology, subsequently achieved great resonance and was republished many times thereafter; it stated, among other things:

What anarchy is, and who the anarchists are, we are about to tell you: Anarchists, messieurs, are citizens who, in an age where the freedom of opinion is preached everywhere, have believed it to be their right and their duty to advocate for unlimited liberty. Yes, messieurs, we are several thousand, perhaps several million, throughout the world, for our only merit is saying out loud what the crowd thinks in silence, we are several million workers who demand absolute liberty, nothing but liberty, the whole of liberty! [...] For history is there to teach us that all governments are alike and are of equal worth. The best are the worst. There is more cynicism in some, more hypocrisy in others. At bottom, it is always the same methods, always the same intolerance. Even the most seemingly liberal governments have in reserve, under the dust of legislative arsenals, some 'good little law' regarding the International, to be used against troublesome oppositions. [...] Scoundrels that we are, we demand peace for all, science for all, work for all; and for all as well, independence and justice.

===== Joseph Bernard and Félicien Bonnet =====
During the individual defenses following the interrogations, Joseph Bernard was the first to take the stand. He denied being a 'leader of the anarchist party' but stated that he would accept the title before the court. He made no mention of the International and instead recounted his life, noting that he began working at the age of fifteen and had devoted his efforts and activity, leaving behind normal youth pleasures like attending balls, first to the workers' party and later to the 'anarchist party', having served as a delegate to the first workers' congresses in France. He closed his statement by saying:

I want the social revolution; I believe that it can only be achieved through force, and regardless of the sentence that awaits me, what I have done in the past, I shall do in the future. I have only one word left to say: If one day the humble and the disinherited, weary of suffering, take to the streets to claim their place in the sun, I will be there.

Bernard was followed by Félicien Bonnet, who briefly said that he was a socialist and wasn't a member of the International.

===== Toussaint Bordat =====
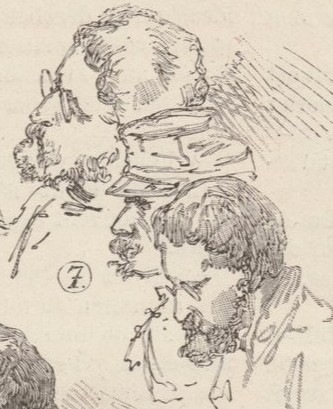
Different views of Bordat during the trial in Le Monde illustré

The defence by Toussaint Bordat, which lasted several hours and was one of the central events of the trial, began with a critique of the 'dramatic' atmosphere the authorities had imposed on the proceedings, which he claimed was 'intended to frighten people who are always quick to alarm'. He also criticized the press for adding to his previous sentences in their descriptions of him before launching into his formal defense. He spoke of his youth, during which he worked as a bricklayer, and compared his situation to the life of the bourgeois prosecutor facing him, declaring that while the prosecutor had the leisure to pursue studies, Bordat had to work by the sweat of his brow.

Next, he addressed his conduct during the Franco-Prussian War, as the prosecutor had accused the anarchists of being cowardly and unpatriotic. He highlighted the fact that he had volunteered for the French troops during the war when he was only sixteen years old. He noted that after being captured by the Prussians, he managed to escape and rejoin the French lines, only to desert later during the Commune, as he refused to march against it. He continued by stating that the Lyon Revolutionary Federation, of which he was a leading figure, would have never subscribed to the London Congress and therefore would not not belong to the Black International. Regarding the meeting of the International held in Geneva in August 1882, he maintained it was merely a gathering of friends intended solely to discuss the separation between anarchists and socialists and nothing more, he declared it ridiculous that France was prosecuting those who had participated in this meeting when neighboring monarchies had not done so on their part.

Bordat stated that he had no connection to the Montceau-les-Mines troubles, and that his travel to the region was simply in his capacity as a journalist for L'Étendard révolutionnaire; he argued that convicting him for this was equivalent to attacking the freedom of the press. Returning to the subject of the International, the Lyonnese said that what truly existed was solidarity among revolutionaries of all countries. However, using rhetoric based on an organizational vision of the International, he declared that as anarchists, the Lyon Revolutionary Federation could not decently 'submit to orders coming from London' or belong to an 'association of an authoritarian nature'.

The canut produced the minutes of Federation meetings where the question of the International had allegedly been proposed by agents provocateurs, discussed and rejected, which he used to argue that, if they had already been members of the International, 'why would they have been asked to join it'?

Above all, Bordat implicated Georges Garraud, known as Valadier, who was a fugitive during the trial, accusing him of being the informant responsible for leaking information regarding the Federation's private meetings. This accusation caused a stir in the courtroom and prompted a categorical denial from Perraudin, the special commissaire of the Rhône. However, Bordat doubled down, declaring that he possessed documents provided by his own informants within the police force, documents he claimed to have hidden and that had not been seized during the raids on his home. Ultimately, the judge, the prosecutor, and Perraudin colluded to prevent Bordat from producing the documents, when requesting that he provide the name(s) of his source(s), leading to this reaction:

Only the papers I had no interest in hiding were found at my home; nothing was found that could compromise my friends. I have a police force of my own, messieurs, which I do not pay, for their services are beyond any payment. You wish to know the names of the authors of these documents, no doubt to have them arrested, but I do not wish to further increase the number of the accused. You, the impartial judge of a free country, believe in the truth of the assertions of your police, who take an oath and yet simultaneously claim they have seen and heard nothing. You may interrogate this police force, and, depending on what they tell you, sentence me to prison, to the galleys, or even to death… I shall always remain faithful to my word of honor and will name no one. If I were in possession of a few millions, I would have distributed some sums to these informants, witnesses whom you hold in such high regard, then, I am certain that, through their mouths, I would have been found innocent. In that case, they would have told the truth, though they would have had to be paid to tell it.

He closed his statement by asserting that it was a political trial and that the anarchists were merely seeking to apply the motto of the French Republic: Liberté, égalité, fraternité.

===== Émile Gautier =====
Émile Gautier, who held a doctorate in law, reflected on his bourgeois upbringing and compared himself to the prosecutor, stating that he could have 'ended up like him' but instead chose to dedicate his efforts to anarchism. He declared that the Lyon Federation was indeed part of 'an International Association', as demonstrated by Perraudin and the prosecutor; however, he maintained that he himself had never been a member of that federation, as he was based in Paris and had gone to Lyon for the first time in October 1882. He opposed the prosecutor's view that he had given a speech representing the Federation in Vienne, as he was already arrested on the mentioned date and had been replaced by Hugonnard in this endeavour.

Later in his speech, Gautier declared that the International had no longer existed since at least 1872, stating that the Hague Congress 'marked its demise'. He maintained that the links between anarchists were instead due to international solidarity within the movement and that the 'International anarchist party' would exist but wouldn't be touched by the Dufaure Law. He also maintained that it was a political trial, that they had not dared to attack Élisée Reclus because of his political and scientific importance, and that what the anarchists were being accused of was done by all political parties, namely, coordinating and reaching agreements across borders. He compared the Trial of the 66 to the trials of the Second Empire against the Republicans and closed his intervention with a definition of anarchism, followed by a declaration in which he affirmed:

The condemnation of the fifty-two defendants will not kill the anarchist party. Remember that in 1871, after the sinister slaughter of 35,000 Parisians, it was believed that the tombstone had been sealed over the murdered socialism, yet today socialism is stronger than ever. Despite your prosecutions, our proselytes will increase, and after your persecutions, if only one anarchist remains, I will be that one.

===== Michel Chavrier, André Courtois, Dominique Crestin, Antoine Desgranges =====
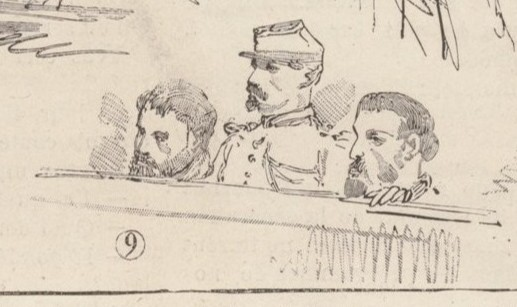
Unknown anarchists during the trial in Le Monde illustré

After Gautier, Michel Chavrier took the floor and declared that, despite his posturing, the prosecutor had failed to prove that the Lyon Revolutionary Federation was part of the Black International. He stated that he was still an anarchist and would remain one regardless of any convictions.

André Courtois, following immediately after, gave a very similar speech, declaring that there had never been any affiliation between the Lyon Revolutionary Federation and the International.

Dominique Crestin, the former manager of Le Droit social, followed them and declared the same, concluding his speech with:

After the eloquent words you have heard from the companions who preceded me at the stand, there is little left to say. I shall therefore confine myself to declaring that if, against all odds, we were to be convicted, I will do in the future what I have done in the past. I was an anarchist, and I shall remain one in spite of everything; the party may have men of greater talent within its ranks, but it will never have more zealous propagandists.

Antoine Desgranges, following next, gave a speech in which he objected to the anarchists being characterized as 'underlings' and idiots manipulated by 'leaders'. Reviewing his life, he spoke of how he was initially deeply involved in the syndicalist movement and local politics, even being elected as a municipal councillor, before concluding that the use of force was the only measure capable of improving the situation, thus becoming an anarchist. He mentioned the group Le Glaive ('The Sword') of Villefranche, to which he belonged, but denied that this group was linked to the International, maintaining that it was intended solely for social studies and that many socialist factions other than anarchists were represented there. He concluded by saying:

I have dedicated my life to the defense of the social revolution, and you can be certain, messieurs of the court, that when it breaks out, I will know how to make that ultimate sacrifice.

===== Étienne and Régis Faure =====
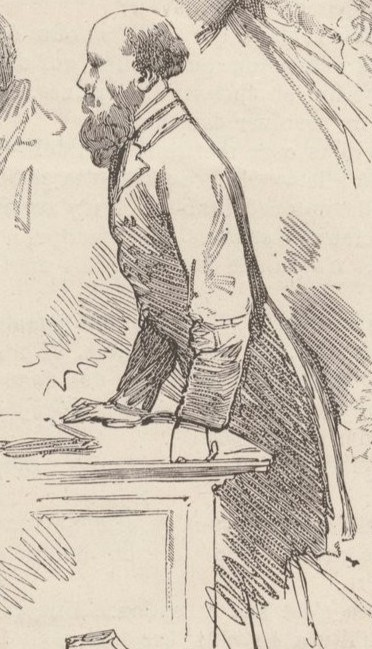
Kropotkin during the trial in Le Monde illustré

Étienne Faure, speaking next, offered a defense in which he maintained sarcastically: 'A certain fatality seems to hang over me; the more self-effacing my role is, the more people feel the need to exaggerate it'. He also criticized the prosecutor's erroneous characterization of his previous convictions in Switzerland.

After him, Régis Faure, from Saint-Étienne, took the floor. He was listened to by the audience with interest and maintained that when he had been arrested in Charolles, the questioning had focused on 'something else entirely' than the International. He denied that the Lyon Revolutionary Federation had any link with the latter. Against the accusation that he had been the delegate of the Saint-Étienne anarchist groups at the international congress of August 1882 in Geneva, he declared that he had never traveled to Geneva. He did, however, admit to having 'played a role in the socialist-revolutionary movement'. According to him, this was a class trial, as the Saint-Étienne Anarchist Alliance had a local name, which proved it was not regional but concentrated solely on Saint-Étienne. Furthermore, the fact that the Saint-Étienne anarchist groups possessed 'neither records, nor statutes, nor ID numbers, nor regulations, nor, in short, anything that characterizes an association', supposedly proved that the Dufaure Law did not apply to them. He concluded his speech by saying:

I condemn, and all my co-defendants will condemn with me, the threats and violent words directed against certain individuals. Not one of us would accept responsibility for the Lyon bombings, for we do not approve of them. I conclude by saying that if you are men of liberty, you will deliver a general acquittal.

===== Peter Kropotkin =====
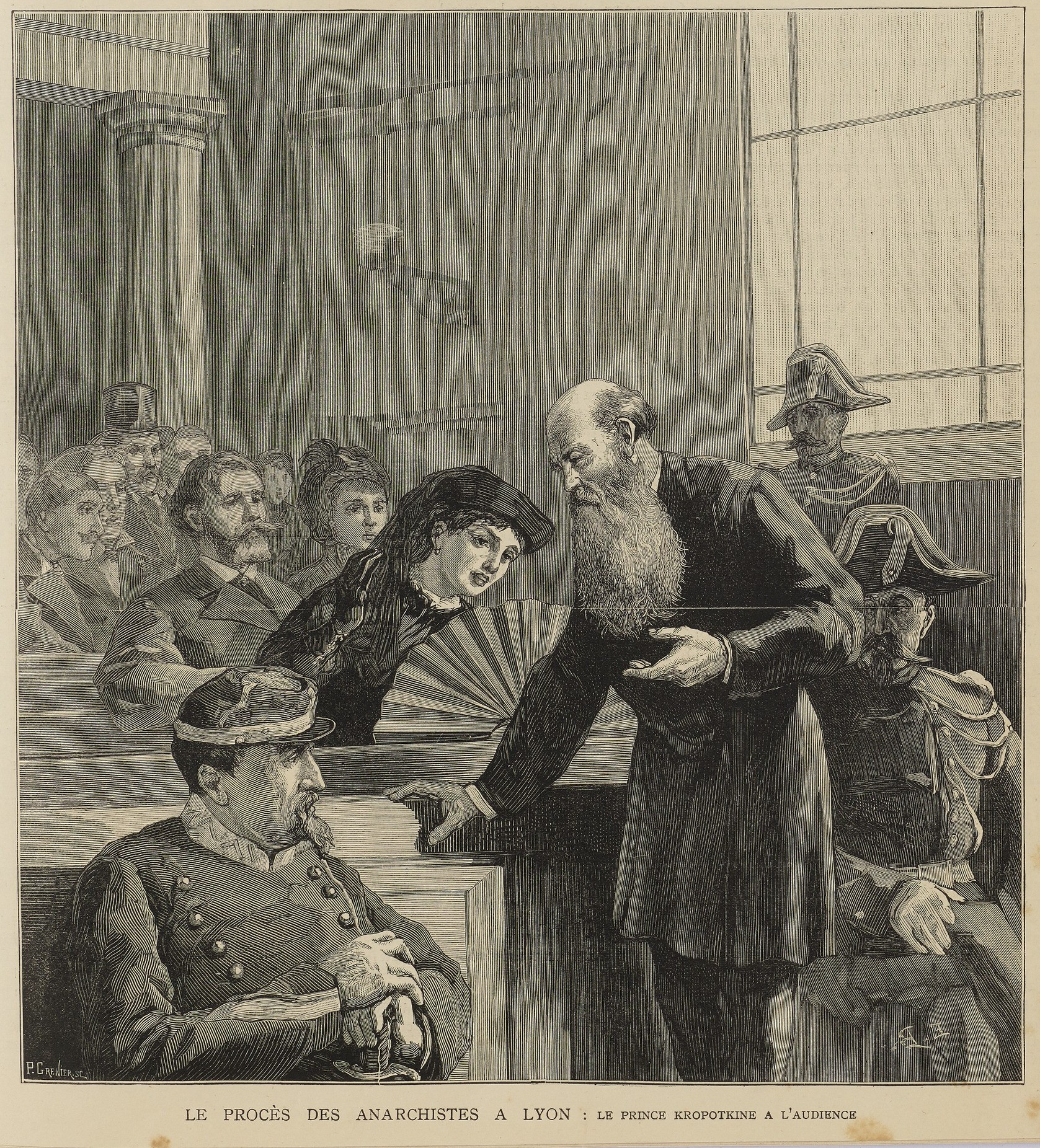
Kropotkin speaking to his wife, Sophie Kropotkin, during the trial, front page of L'Illustration of 27 January 1883

The defence speech by Kropotkin, another central event of the trial, occurred after that of Régis Faure. He began his address by declaring:

I believe, messieurs, that you must have been struck, as I was, by the weakness of the accusations brought against us. Are you in the presence of an International Association ? I could refrain from answering, for the proceedings are already well advanced and the proof has yet to be produced. It seems to me, moreover, that the prosecution collapsed at the same moment the following words were uttered by order of the public prosecutor: 'As long as there is an anarchist in Lyon', said this magistrate, 'I will prosecute him with the text of the law in hand'. These words alone suffice to indicate that the trial brought against us is a trial of opinion, a class trial. [...] Certainly, it would have been great if we could have come here and declared to you that we belonged to the International; but we could not do so, since that great association of workers no longer exists in France, ever since the iniquitous law of 1872 destroyed it. For my part, I would have been proud to confess to you that I was affiliated with that society, and even if the freedom of the defendants depended on it, I would have told you so!

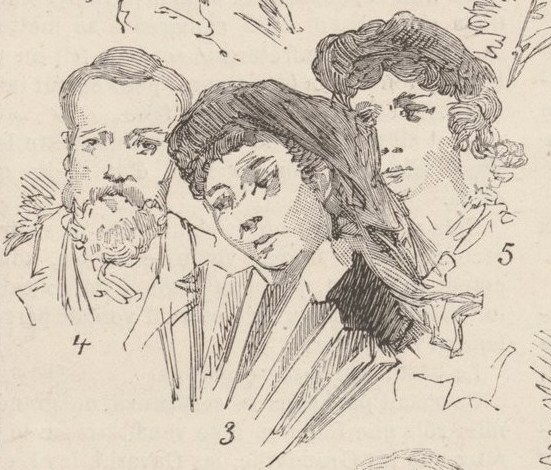
Sophie Kropotkin (3), her sister (5) and the secretary of the prince during the trial in Le Monde illustré

In the following part of his speech, he revisited the prosecutor's accusations of anti-patriotism and pointed out that he was, quite naturally, more moved when he heard a Russian song than a French one; however, he stated that he loved France because it was the 'cradle of revolutions'; he also noted that during the Franco-Prussian War, it was the German socialists who had protested. For him, the travels and meetings he was accused of were merely simple trips, with no aim of propaganda or establishing groups. He revisited his biography, his imprisonment in Russia, and the fact that many of his companions had gone mad in prison there; he noted that, despite being a prince and an aristocrat, he had gradually taken the side of the proletarians during his youth. He also complained that the press misrepresented his life and that he was accused of being the leader of the anarchists, even though they wanted no leader, nor was he the founder, as he claimed the founders were 'Proudhon and Bakunin'. Kropotkin also made jokes that provoked laughter from the audience, declaring, for example:

I continually receive letters in which I am offered dynamite. My wife, who is in Lyon, herself receives proposals for infernal machines. Just as in Thonon, individuals would come to my home asking for jobs as gardeners or servants, when in reality they were there to spy on me; I would give them ten sous, pitying them for practicing such a vile trade. The next day, the newspaper Le Lyon Républicain dared to print: 'Our correspondent saw Prince Kropotkin, who told him he was the leader of the anarchist movement'.

According to him, the repression of the International would not lead to the disappearance of 'murdered socialism'; attempts had been made to destroy it twice before, under the Commune and by the Prussians, without success, only drawing more proselytes into the socialist ranks, echoing to some extent the position held by Gautier earlier. He then engaged in a more developed analysis of capitalism and the oppression it imposed upon the workers; highlighting the misery of the proletariat and contending that the anarchist social revolution would arrive within ten years, inviting the judges and the audience to make the right choice and become anarchists to hasten this revolution and join it once it happened.

===== Louis Genet and Jean Ricard =====
Louis Genet, who spoke next, declared that there were no bylaws or regulations in the Vienne group to which he belonged, which wouldn't be part of the International, and that if he had attended the Geneva International meeting, it was in a private capacity and not as a group delegate.

For his part, Jean Ricard maintained that it was a mistake to label Kropotkin the 'father of anarchy', as this idea would have had first been formulated by Diderot; according to him, one of its greatest theorists was Arthur Arnould, whose work L'Etat et la Révolution (1876) would be a definitive reference. He disputed the claim that the Lyon Revolutionary Federation was affiliated with the International, arguing that it was not the Jura Federation that had created the groups in question in France, but rather that they had emerged spontaneously from the will of several companions. He concluded his defence by declaring:

The International, the one most generally known, seeks to suspend work and organize a general strike; the anarchists seek to abolish the bosses. At the Geneva anarchist meeting that has been mentioned, the companions did not concern themselves with the International, but rather with the complete separation of the anarchist party from all political parties, whether radical or workers' parties. The International is a powerful association possessing everything that characterizes an association, whereas the Lyon Federation has no secret organization, no laws, no regulations, no leader, and no discipline. It is, therefore, not part of the association.

===== Michel Sala =====
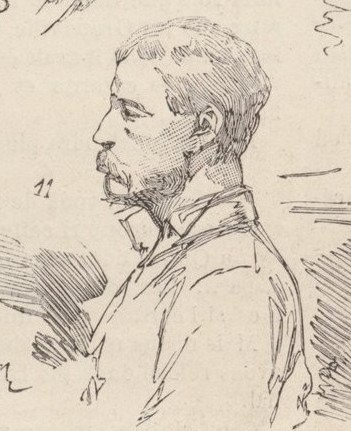
Potet during the trial in Le Monde illustré

Michel Sala delivered an energetic defence, concluding with the following declaration:

I was an anarchist before entering prison, I shall be one upon leaving, and on the day the red flag flies in the street, I, like so many others, will go to take my place beneath its folds.

===== Alexandre Tressaud =====
Alexandre Tressaud of Marseille, the anarchist who had been tasked with delivering their joint declaration earlier in the trial, defended himself by stating that the International had disappeared in France since the Commune, but also that it was merely a 'means, and what is truly pursued is the anarchist idea'. He then tried to show how the Lyon Federation, composed of autonomous members and groups, diverged from the International. In Marseille, he claimed, a federation did not even exist. He maintained that this was a class trial; then, facing accusations that anarchists attacked the family, he countered by saying that anarchists held a 'feeling and respect for the family to a degree at least as great as our accusers'. He highlighted the suicide of a lady named Feyghine, who 'took her own life for a bourgeois man,' and argued that the bourgeois, who were always speaking of morality and family, possessed multiple families and cheated on their wives.

When he made this remark, the judge interrupted him, stating that he could not encompass the entire bourgeoisie within 'exceptions'; Tressaud doubled down and then resumed by declaring that anarchists did not wish to abolish property but to extend it to all individuals at once, and that while universal suffrage might have seemed promising in 1848, its futility had now been demonstrated. He also complained that the interrogations conducted had not actually concerned affiliation with the International.

===== Pierre Martin =====
Pierre Martin, who succeeded him at the stand, opened his defense by returning to the subject of the International, asserting:

Even after everything that has been said by the defense counsel, even after everything that has been said by the defendants, I believe that one cannot draw the court's attention enough to this fact: the anarchist party possesses none of the characteristics that distinguish the International. It would have been necessary to demonstrate, establish, and specify that this party was a vast association with soldiers and leaders, a discipline, and bylaws. Has the prosecution been able to prove that the acts of each individual are the result of orders coming from any social authority whatsoever? One must say no, along with me. Nowhere has the slightest trace of affiliation been found; and yet, we all know that the government has at its service a foreseeing, perceptive police force, which often discovers that which does not exist. That is the case today. There is, moreover, a flagrant contradiction between our principles and those advocated by the International.

He added that the conviction of the defendants would change nothing and would increase anarchism instead of destroying it. Martin thus echoed the thesis of Gautier and Kropotkin, according to which repression would only serve to increase the number of anarchists. He then engaged in a discussion on anarchism as a philosophy desiring liberty, and denied that Kropotkin, Bordat, Gautier, and Bernard were leaders of the movement, for all anarchists were equals; he concluded that he could indeed be convicted as an anarchist, but not for affiliation with the International.

===== Jacques Zuida =====
After him, Jacques Zuida stated that he was 'frankly anarchist'. He addressed the accusation of a lack of patriotism leveled against the anarchists by declaring that, as an Alsatian himself, he had enlisted as a volunteer in the French army during the Franco-Prussian War and had fought at the front, carrying out reconnaissance missions through the Prussian lines that provided useful intelligence. He concluded by saying that he 'was an anarchist yesterday, is one today, and would still be one tomorrow'.

===== Nicolas Didelin =====
Nicolas Didelin, a cousin of Louise Michel who followed him and had already been defended by his lawyer, declared that he was a committed 'socialist-anarchist' and that he fully adhered to the Declaration of the Anarchists read by companion Tressaud. He admitted to having called for the strike of conscripts and gave a speech on the matter, stating, among other things, that it was 'unjust for workers to lose the five best years of their youth preparing for the defense of property, often to be massacred for the preservation of the assets and privileges of others'.

===== François Péjot and Jacques Peillon =====
François Péjot and Jacques Peillon, who followed next, gave brief speeches. The former declared that he was an anarchist and would continue to be one, and that he was not a leader, as such a thing did not exist within the movement. The latter declared that he did not belong to any International, that he was an anarchist in the past, was one at present, and would continue to be so.

===== Octave Liégeon, Philippe Sanlaville and Pierre Michaud =====
Octave Liégeon admitted to being a member of the group Le Glaive ('The Sword') of Villefranche but that he wished he could have been even more active within it. He stated that his opinions were reflected in the declaration made by Régis Faure, then concluded by saying that he would remain an anarchist after his release from prison.

Philippe Sanlaville noted that he was very surprised to have been arrested for affiliation with the International, as he would have belonged to no group and had simply participated in meetings where the bourgeoisie was attacked, something he considered not only a right, but a duty. He concluded by attacking the bourgeois press and its 'vile assaults against the anarchists'.

Finally, Pierre Michaud, from Le Creusot in Saône-et-Loire, took the floor. He maintained that his anarchist group, Les Criminels ('The Criminals'), could not have joined the International because that organization did not exist. He stated that he had been a member of the trade union movement but had evolved, finding his place within his anarchist group instead.

=== Judgement ===
==== General introductory points ====
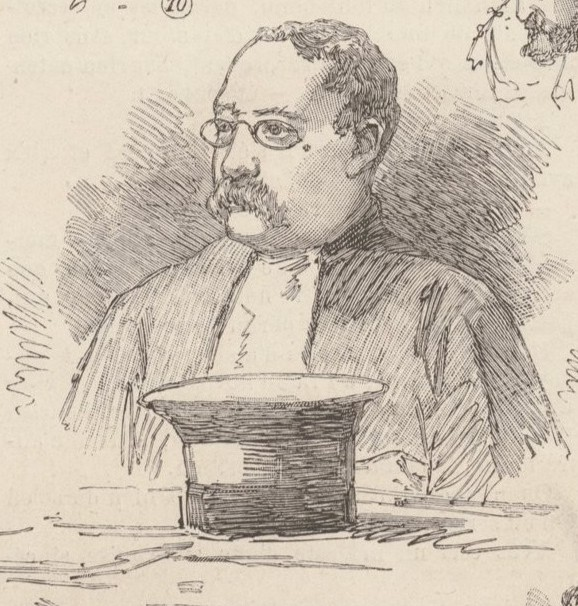
Judge Jacomet during the trial in Le Monde illustré

In its judgment spanning 50 pages, the judge started by saying that he was relaxing de Gaudenzi, Girodon, Mathon, Ribeyre and Thomas for insufficient proof against them, and that it had based his subsequent assessment on five types of evidence; which included:

1. the collection of the newspapers Le Révolté, Le Droit social, and L’Étendard révolutionnaire published in Lyon; 2. the letters seized at the office of L’Étendard, at the defendants' homes, or on their persons; 3. the interrogations and statements of the defendants; 4. the minutes of public meetings organized in Lyon or elsewhere, drawn up by police commissaires; 5. various manifestos, circulars, placards, posters, notebooks, brochures, subscription lists, registers, letters of convocation to private meetings, and specific stamps belonging to the Lyon Anarchist Federation.

He started by starting to establish that the anarchist press concerned on paragraph 1 would be the official way that the anarchist groups corresponded, using for that, the formal confession of the accused regarding the editing of the newspapers Le Révolté, Le Droit social, and L’Étendard révolutionnaire; the use of these articles by the defense itself; Bordat's admission at the trial concerning the blurring of lines between the editorial board of L’Étendard and the administration of the federation; the precise content of the newspapers regarding anarchist doctrine and tactics; the accused' acknowledgment of sending or receiving their seized correspondence (except 4 of them); the admission of statements made in public meetings; the lack of challenge regarding the documents listed in paragraph 5; and the legal validity of the search-and-seizure reports.

He continued by introducing the existence and activities of the Lyon Revolutionary Federation since 1881, citing the dispatch of two delegates to the Saint-Étienne Congress; the representation of the Federation by Peter Kropotkin at the London Congress; the reading of a report concerning Lyon by Kropotkin at this Congress; the publication of electoral manifestos advocating for abstention and propaganda of the deed in 1881; the sending of manifestos signed by the secretary to regional congresses; or the publication in Le Droit social on 5 March 1882, containing a list of sections and the names of their secretaries.

To prove the radicalism and the 'criminal intent' of the accused, he cited: the 'Social Movement' columns in the anarchist press, which would have attested to the relationships between groups; the organization of public meetings via personal summons to private gatherings; the subscription for a revolver of honor presented to Fournier; the calls to overturn jury verdicts; the death sentences issued against jurors and magistrates; the declaration of solidarity with the Montceau-les-Mines attacks; the encouragement given to the anarchist Jolly to assassinate the President of the Republic; the designation of specific monuments to be destroyed and categories of people to be eliminated; and the glorification of the dagger, poison, and dynamite.

Regarding the regional ramifications of the Lyon Federation and the collusion between the groups (St-Étienne, Villefranche, Vienne, etc.), he mentioned the activities of the Anarchist Youth and the Outlaws groups in Saint-Étienne; those of Le Glaive and the Indignés groups in Villefranche and Vienne; the circular from the Vienne group providing the address of the secretary, Martin; the address statistics sent from Villefranche to Bernard; the letter of 12 August 1882, from Saint-Étienne to Bordat; a letter from Auguste Ebersold to the Lyon Federation; the correspondence between Vienne and Villefranche; the letters from Jean Grave acknowledging the founding of groups by Gautier; the letter from the Le Creusot group with the 'Revolutionary Federation' letterhead; the correspondence from Tressaud; the mail received from Bordeaux, Ganges, and Névian; the insertion of a decision signed by Bernard in La Révolution sociale for all French groups; and the reciprocal exchange of anarchist brochures and placards. He also accused the Lyon Federation of being behind the Assommoir bombing and of having sought to procure dynamite, through Bordat and other anarchists, in Switzerland or elsewhere.

==== Black International affiliation and the London Congress ====
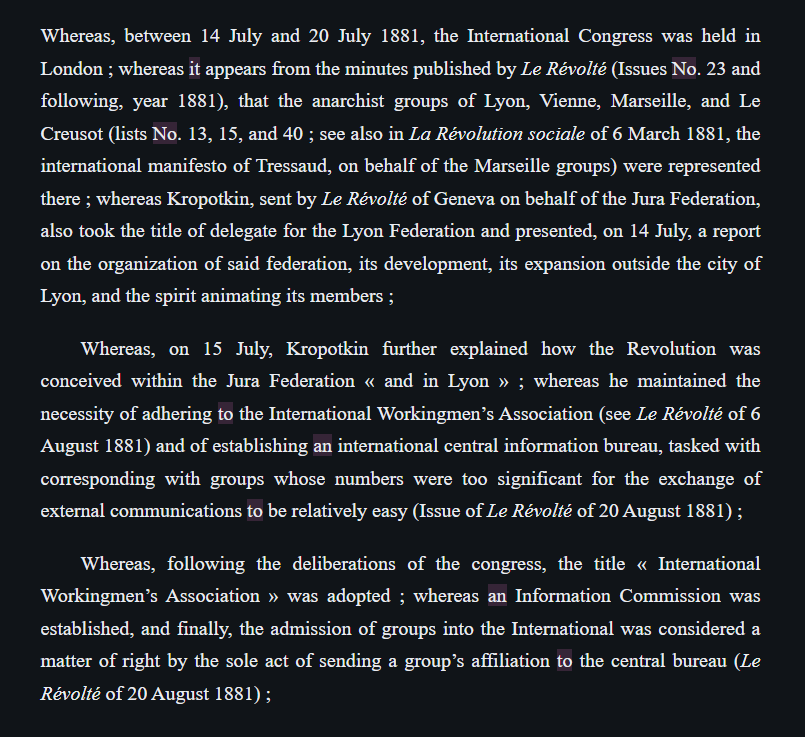
Parts of the rationale of the judge in the Black International affiliation part

Considering that the criminal intent of the anarchists was established by all these elements, the judge proceeded to the central question of the trial: whether or not they were affiliated with the International. He opened this section by declaring:

Whereas it is established for the Court, based on an examination of the case file, that the International Workingmen's Association, targeted by the Law of 1872, had ceased to exist several years prior; however, in the months of April and May 1881, under the influence of agitators from various countries and notably Kropotkin, an organizing committee was formed in London and addressed appeals to the revolutionaries of both worlds with a view to grouping all insurrectionary forces for the reconstitution of the International Workingmen's Association.

As in the prosecutor's closing argument, the London Congress occupied a significant place in the judge's reasoning. He noted that several defendants had traveled there or had sent delegates, notably Kropotkin, who served as a delegate for both the Jura Federation and the Lyon Federation, delivering a speech on behalf of the latter according to his own testimony in Le Révolté. Above all, the judge rejected the defense's claims that the International would still manifest itself through formal statutes, membership rolls, and so forth. In his view, the London Congress had very clearly evolved the structure of the organization by maintaining only the central information bureau as a permanent body; regarding this, he wrote:

Whereas it appears from the study conducted by the Court that the constitution of the International Association established in London possesses a unique character; as the distinctive trait of the anarchist idea is the absence of authority, constant effort was made during the meetings to remove anything that could be considered a power or even a leadership; it proceeded from the principle that all groups should maintain their autonomy and not abdicate power to administrators, as in the former International Association; in summary, it can henceforth be considered that the International Association manifests itself only through the assembly of group delegates composing a congress, deliberating on means of action, making the necessary resolutions, and temporarily ceasing its activity upon the dispersal of the delegates until such time as the central information bureau, at fixed dates or at an opportune moment, sends out summons to all groups worldwide;

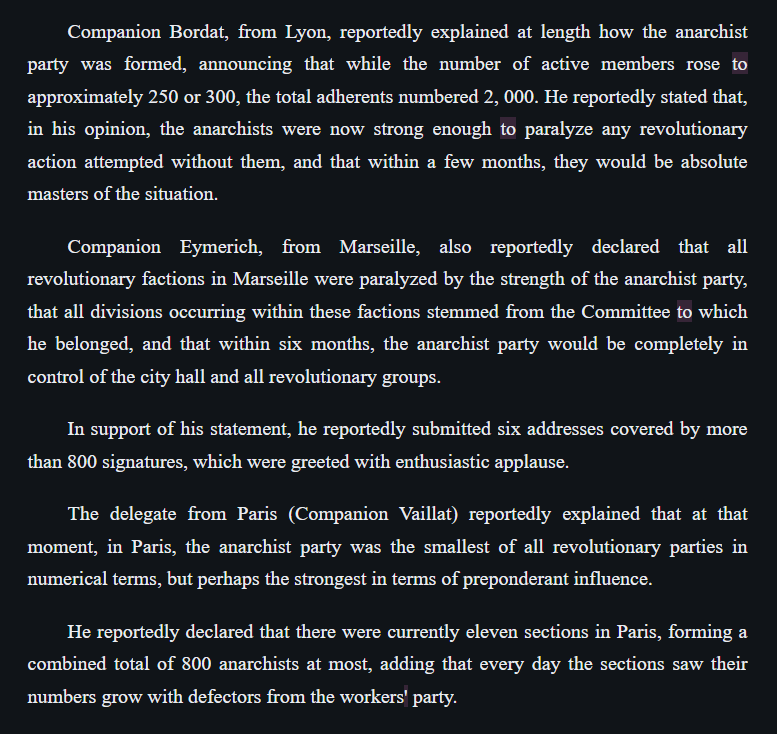
Report by informant Droz about the August 1882 Geneva meeting, which provided some of the information used by the judge

He argued that the anarchists were not fools and knew that affiliation was punishable in France, citing a letter from Gautier to Arsène Crié dated 22 February 1881. In it, Gautier complained that certain anarchist press outlets wanted to publish the names of the delegates to the London Congress, stating that 'this was an absurdity' and that:

There is a 99-out-of-100 chance that the companions whose names are thus revealed will be arrested within 48 hours and duly convicted in countries where the International is outlawed. It is needless to add that this would mean the death of the party currently forming in France...

He maintained that Michaud's Le Creusot group had sought to affiliate with the congress by sending a delegate, citing a subscription list seized at his home intended for the dispatch of such a delegate; furthermore, that the Saint-Étienne groups had also sought to affiliate by entering into contact with the central information bureau. He also mentioned the fact that François Dejoux was sent as a delegate to the Lausanne Congress on 4 June 1882, representing the Lyon Federation, and that, upon his return, he had declared in the Lyon anarchist press:

I have seen the International Workingmen's Association as vibrant as ever.

According to him, based on seized letters, the anarchist press, and other evidence, Bordat, Morel, the Trenta brothers, Péjot, Régis Faure, Étienne Faure, Ricard, Michel Sala, Fages, Vaillat, Michel, an unnamed member of the Montceau-les-Mines group, and an unnamed delegate from Le Glaive group of Villefranche, had all participated in the international meeting in Geneva in August 1882.

=== Sentences, appeal and later police repression ===
Ultimately, of the 66 defendants, 14 of whom (20%) were fugitives, all but five were convicted. Sentences ranged from a few months in prison to the maximum penalty allowed by law for the affiliation to the International for those deemed most responsible, such as Kropotkin, Bordat, Gautier and Bernard. Those who managed to escape also received particularly harsh sentences. In total, the court handed down 165 years of imprisonment and a sum of 50,000 francs (≃250,000 USD of 2026), a considerable amount for the time.

While some of the convicted anarchists filed appeals, Michel returned to Paris, where she published La Vengeance Anarchiste and reunited with the carpenters' union of the Île-de-France region. A few days before the appeal ruling in March 1883, Michel and this union organized the demonstration of 9 March 1883. It was a particularly insurrectionary event, during which the crowd marched on the French Ministry of the Interior and the Élysée Palace, the seat of the French president, before being pushed back at the very last moment. This demonstration became famous for Michel's use of the black flag. After successfully evading capture, she eventually surrendered to the police. Four days later, the appellate judge called Rieussec decided to reduce the sentences of Liégeon, Crestin, Blonde, Péjot, Tressaud, Michaud, Bonnet, Régis Faure, Peillon, Voisin, Bayet, Gleizal dit Garnier, Pinoy, Sanlaville, Morel, Bruyère, and Dupoizat - arguing that the previous judgement had totally disregarded any mitigating circumstances (age, poverty, repentance, etc.) - the sentences of the 'figures' stayed the same, though.

According to the historian CEP, the French police undertook political maneuvers and dubious or illegal activities to imprison certain anarchists who had been released after serving their sentences, such as Sanlaville. He writes regarding him: 'Sanlaville was arrested on 7 June 1884, for being unable to pay the fines related to the Trial of the 66. In a report on him, the Special commissaire of the Rhône was satisfied with his incarceration and announced that it would be necessary to arrest other recently released anarchists: Bardoux, Bayet, Bonnet, and Fabre. This police maneuver was intended to 'instill a healthy fear' among those who, though released, 'nonetheless maintain a more correct attitude and abstain from putting themselves in the spotlight'. They were all arrested between June and July 1884, with the prosecutor attempting to have them sentenced to two years in prison. They were given the minimum sentence (one year) and, being unable to pay, had to be released halfway through the term. Sanlaville was released on 7 December 1884'.

== Legacy ==
=== Historical analysis ===
Reflecting on the trial and its importance within the anarchist movement of the time, historian Vivien Bouhey writes:

The growth of this combat organization on [French] territory did not fail to provoke sharp reactions from the authorities (major trials thus took place, such as the one in 1883 in Lyon), which did not prevent many believers from joining the movement at all.

== Bibliography ==
- Baylac, Marie-Hélène (2024), Louise Michel, Paris: Perrin, ISBN 978-2262097714
- Bouhey, Vivien (2008), Les Anarchistes contre la République [The Anarchists against the Republic], Rennes: Presses universitaires de Rennes (PUR)
- Cahm, Caroline (1989), Kropotkin and the rise of revolutionary anarchism, 1872-1886, Cambridge; New York: Cambridge University Press (CUP), ISBN 0-521-36445-0
- Carlson, Andrew (1972), Anarchism in Germany, vol. 1, Metuchen, N. J.: The Scarecrow Press, Inc., ISBN 0-8 108-0484-0
- Eisenzweig, Uri (2001). Fictions de l'anarchisme [Fictions of anarchism] (in French). France: C. Bourgois. ISBN 2-267-01570-6.
