= London Congress =

London Congress may refer to:

- the 1881 London Social Revolutionary Congress
- the 1896 4th Congress of the Second International
- the 1900 First Pan-African Conference
- the 1907 5th Congress of the Russian Social Democratic Labour Party
