= Dufaure Law =

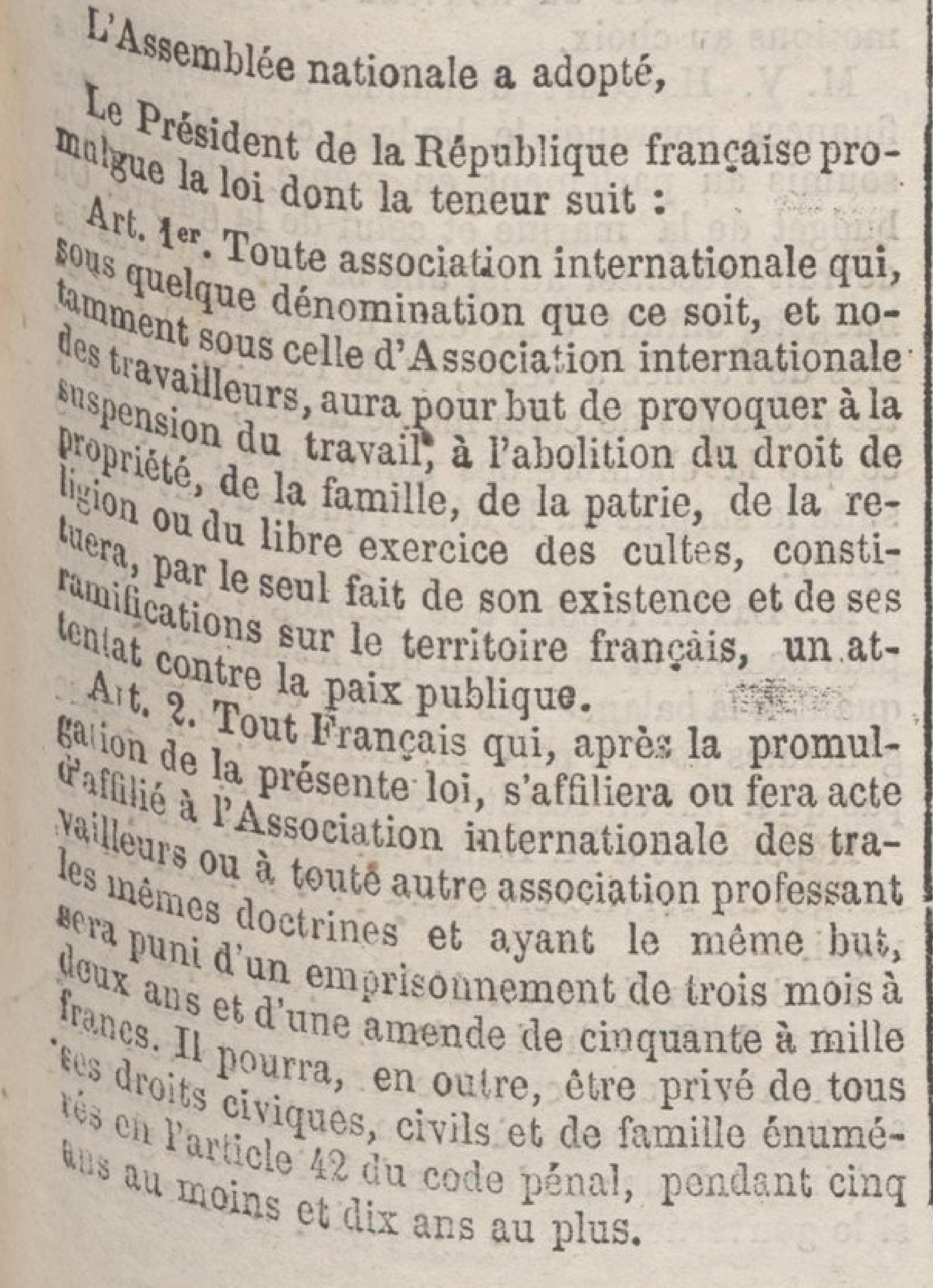
First article of the Dufaure Law in the Journal officiel de la République française of 23 March 1872

The Dufaure Law of 14 March 1872 is a repressive French law enacted to suppress the First International and its subsequent offshoots. Passed amidst the repression of the French Communes, which the International was falsely accused of organizing, it forced the organization underground in France.

Following the Communes in France, the republican government initially sought to establish a European agreement to suppress the International jointly with other powers. However, after this initiative proved unsuccessful, Adolphe Thiers and Jules Dufaure, his Minister of Justice, decided to pass this law, which criminalized membership in the organization and banned its existence in France. As early as 1873, it was used in French trials to dismantle the International.

In 1882 to 1883, French authorities reused this law to target anarchists accused of belonging to the Black International, at a time when they were unable to prove their participation in the insurrections or bombings occurring across the country. The Trial of the 66 in January 1883 was based entirely on the Dufaure Law and led to the conviction of nearly all the defendants.

== History ==
=== Context: First International and Communes in France ===
The International Workingmen's Association (IWA), or the First International, was a workers' association founded in London in 1864. It was a fundamental organization in the history of the workers' movement, quickly bringing together many figures linked to its history, such as Karl Marx, Mikhail Bakunin, James Guillaume, Friedrich Engels, Errico Malatesta, and Carlo Cafiero. Different political movements were represented, ranging from anarchism to Marxism, as well as more moderate socialists and Proudhonists.

In 1870, the Second Empire collapsed, brought down by its rapid defeat and the capture of Napoleon III in the Franco-Prussian War. A more or less self-proclaimed republican government took power and decided to negotiate with the Prussians to end the war and the occupation of the territory. The Parisian population, which was under siege, refused to submit to the demands of Adolphe Thiers's government to surrender their weapons. A large-scale insurrectionary and revolutionary episode, the Paris Commune, began when the government attempted to disarm the National Guard. This movement was accompanied by numerous other Communes across France, such as the one in Lyon, in which Bakunin participated.

All the rebellious Communes were crushed in the following months. The Paris Commune was suppressed in a highly violent and dramatic manner during the Bloody Week, when up to 25,000 Parisians were massacred by republican forces. This event caused an immense shock within French society: revolutionaries saw their ranks decimated and many of their friends killed by the repression, while political and religious elites were gripped by severe paranoia and profound fear.

=== Dufaure Law ===
Although the Internationalists were not the originators of the Communes, in the sense that they joined them but were far from being the majority or even the leaders of the Communards, the International became an enemy to be destroyed. It was targeted by media, religious, and parliamentary attack campaigns, and the French state set itself in motion to crush the organization.

The government of Adolphe Thiers wished to pursue a European policy directed against the International. Consequently, it initially sought to assess the possibility of neighboring countries joining France in the repression, receiving positive assurances from the conservative German and Russian governments. However, Switzerland and Belgium were much less favorable to such measures, making international coordination of the repression impossible.

Faced with this situation, the government was forced to refocus the repression solely on French territory, and as early as August 1871, it began debating a law against the International. The law was developed over the following months and adopted in Versailles on 14 March 1872. It prohibited French citizens or foreigners in France from participating in the organization, under penalty of two years in prison, and up to five years for those holding positions of responsibility within it. The law sought more generally to isolate the individuals it targeted by isolating them within French society, which it did notably by placing them under high-police surveillance and stripping them of their civil or family rights.

Although the law was ultimately adopted, it faced criticism from certain conservative politicians, who argued that such a measure would have the opposite effect of what the authorities intended and that the labor movement would find new strength because of the law.

=== Application and the Trial of the 66 ===
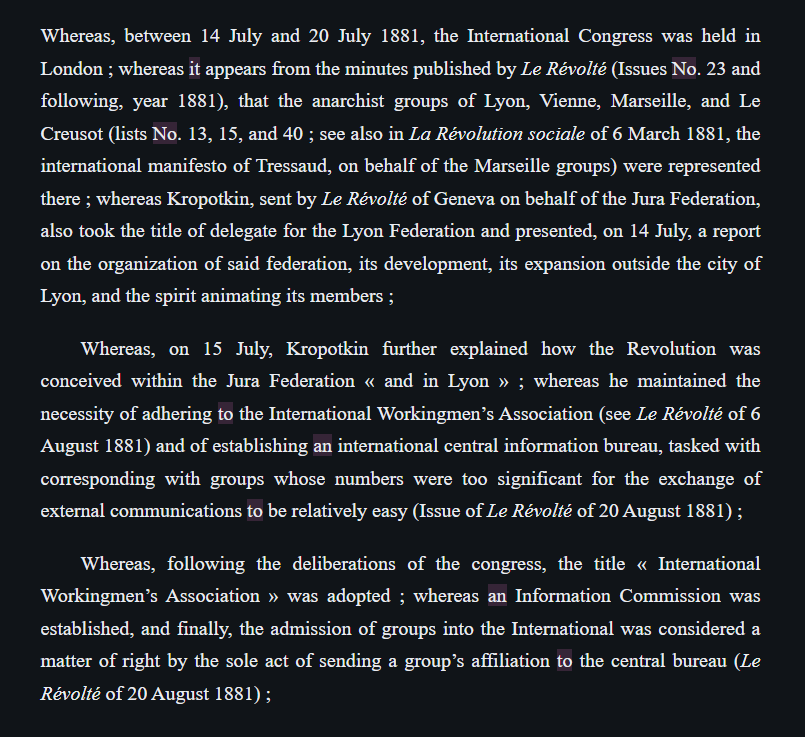
Parts of the rationale of the judge in the Black International affiliation part during the trial of the 66

As early as 1873, the law was used to suppress attempts to reorganize the International in Béziers, Lisieux, Paris, and Toulouse. In the meantime, the International had split into two: the Marxist International (1872 to 1876) and the Anti-Authoritarian International (1872 to 1881). In the years that followed, the Anti-Authoritarian International brought together the majority of the International's federations and was therefore the primary target of the French authorities, a dynamic that intensified after the disappearance of the Marxist International in 1876.

In 1879 to 1880, the French state granted the Amnesty of the Communards, visibly bringing an end to the period of repression targeting them. The following year, anarchists from the Anti-Authoritarian International and other socialist factions met at the London Congress and voted to dissolve the visible structures of the International in order to adopt a program of insurrection and propaganda of the deed, marking the birth of the Black International.

Following this congress, the anarchists of the Black International publicized the organization in their press, partly because they had been reassured by the amnesty of the Communards, according to historian Dominique Petit. In any case, by 1882, the situation in France was becoming increasingly unstable for the authorities, particularly around Lyon and the surrounding regions. The French state and the anarchists were heading toward an increasingly conflictual situation, exacerbated by the severe famine affecting the city of Lyon.

In October, Fanny Madignier and at least two other anarchists carried out the Assommoir bombing to avenge the repression of anarchists, which in turn triggered a new and much larger wave of repression. These state actions were not based on charges related to the bombings themselves, for which the guilt of the accused could be difficult to prove, but rather on the reuse of the Dufaure Law, accusing them of having subscribed to the London Congress and thus belonging to the Black International.

In January, 66 anarchists were put on trial during the Trial of the 66. Peter Kropotkin, Joseph Bernard, Émile Gautier, and Toussaint Bordat were the main defendants and received the maximum penalty possible under the Dufaure Law. Most of the defendants were convicted of membership in the International.

== Primary sources ==
- Original of the Dufaure Law

== Bibliography ==
- Cahm, Caroline (1989), Kropotkin and the Rise of Revolutionary Anarchism 1872–1886, Cambridge University Press, ISBN 0-521-36445-0, OCLC 19553164
- Cordillot, Michel (2025), La Première Internationale en France (1864 - 1880) [The First International in France (1864–1880)] (in French), Paris: Éditions de l'Atelier, ISBN 9782708294981
- Enckell, Marianne (2012), La Fédération jurassienne [The Jura Federation] (in French), Geneva - Paris: Entremonde, ISBN 978-2-940426-16-4
- Graham, Robert (2019), "Anarchism and the First International", The Palgrave Handbook of Anarchism, Loughborough, UK: Palgrave Macmillan, pp. 325–343, ISBN 978-3-319-75619-6
- Hayat, Samuel (2018), "Les internationales ouvrières" [The Workers' Internationals], Le Magasin du XIXe siècle (in French), no. 8
- Merriman, John M. (2016), The Dynamite Club: How a Bombing in Fin-de-Siècle Paris Ignited the Age of Modern Terror, Yale: Yale University Press, ISBN 978-0-300-21792-6
- Miller, Martin A. (1976), Kropotkin, University of Chicago Press, ISBN 978-0-226-52594-5
