= Émile Gautier =

French anarchist (1853–1937)

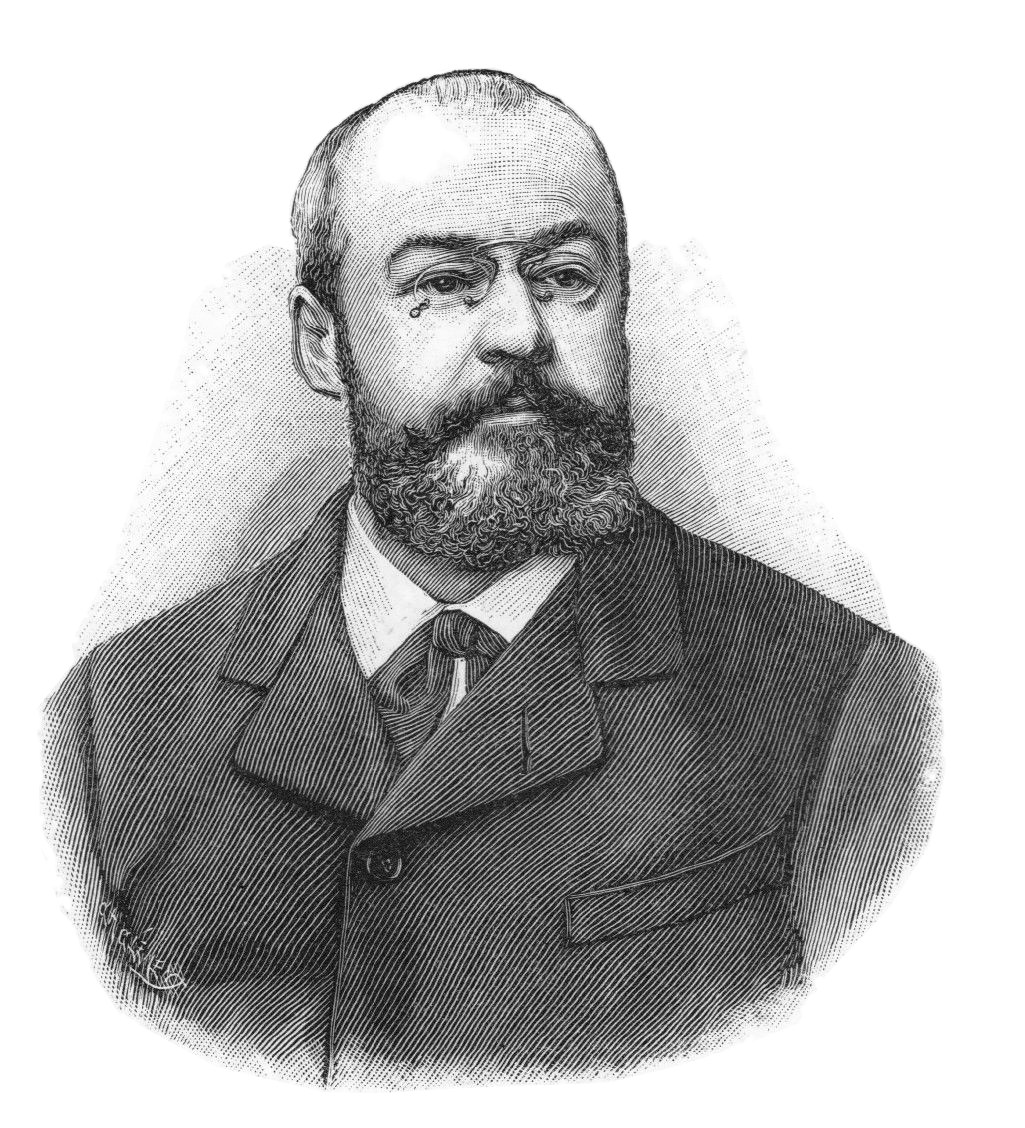
- Émile Gautier in 1904
- Born: 19 January 1853; Rennes, France
- Died: 1937 (aged 83–84)
- Occupation: Journalist
- Known for: Social Darwinism

Émile Jean-Marie Gautier (19 January 1853 – 1937) was a French anarchist and later a journalist. He coined the term "social Darwinism".

== Life ==
Émile Jean-Marie Gautier was born on 19 January 1853, in Rennes. His parents were Jean Marie Gautier, usher, and Marie Louise Marais. He obtained a doctorate in law. He became a disciple of Jules Vallès.

Gautier attended the July 1881 London Social Revolutionary Congress. Other delegates included Peter Kropotkin, Errico Malatesta, Saverio Merlino, Louise Michel and Marie Le Compte. While respecting "complete autonomy of local groups" the congress defined propaganda actions that all could follow and agreed that "propaganda by the deed" was the path to social revolution. Gautier was implicated during the trial of the 66, and on 19 January 1883 was sentenced by the Criminal Court of Lyon to five years in prison. On 15 August 1885 he was pardoned.

Gautier renounced political activism. He worked at various newspapers, including L'Écho de Paris, where he met Octave Mirbeau, and Le Figaro, where he published "documentary chronicles". These were published as a collection in 1992 under the title Les Étapes de la science (Steps of science). According to the historian of social thought Mike Hawkins, Emile Gautier was the first to use the term "social darwinism" in his pamphlet of the same name published in 1880 in Paris. He became a well-known popular science writer. His 1902 Fleur de Bagne (Prison flowers), written with his childhood friend Marie-François Goron, was an ancestor of techno-thrillers and crime dramas with science themes.

== Quotation ==
"Prison as it is organized is a cesspool, pouring into society a steady stream of corruption and germs, physiological and moral contagion; it poisons, brutalizes and corrupts." The World of prisons (Lyon, 1889)

== Bibliography ==
- Le Darwinisme social (1880 – Social Darwinism)
- Étienne Marcel (Paris, 1881)
- Propos anarchistes (1885 – About anarchists)
- Le Parlementarisme (1885 – The Parliamentary System)
- Heures de travail (1885 – Hours of work)
- Les Endormeurs (1885 – The sleeper)
- Le Monde des prisons (Lyon, 1889 – The world of prisons)
- Fleurs de bagne, with Marie-François Goron (1902 – Prison flowers)
- Les Paysans, with Louise Michel (Paris, Incomplete)
