= Rolf Dupuy =

French anarchist and historian (1946–2025)

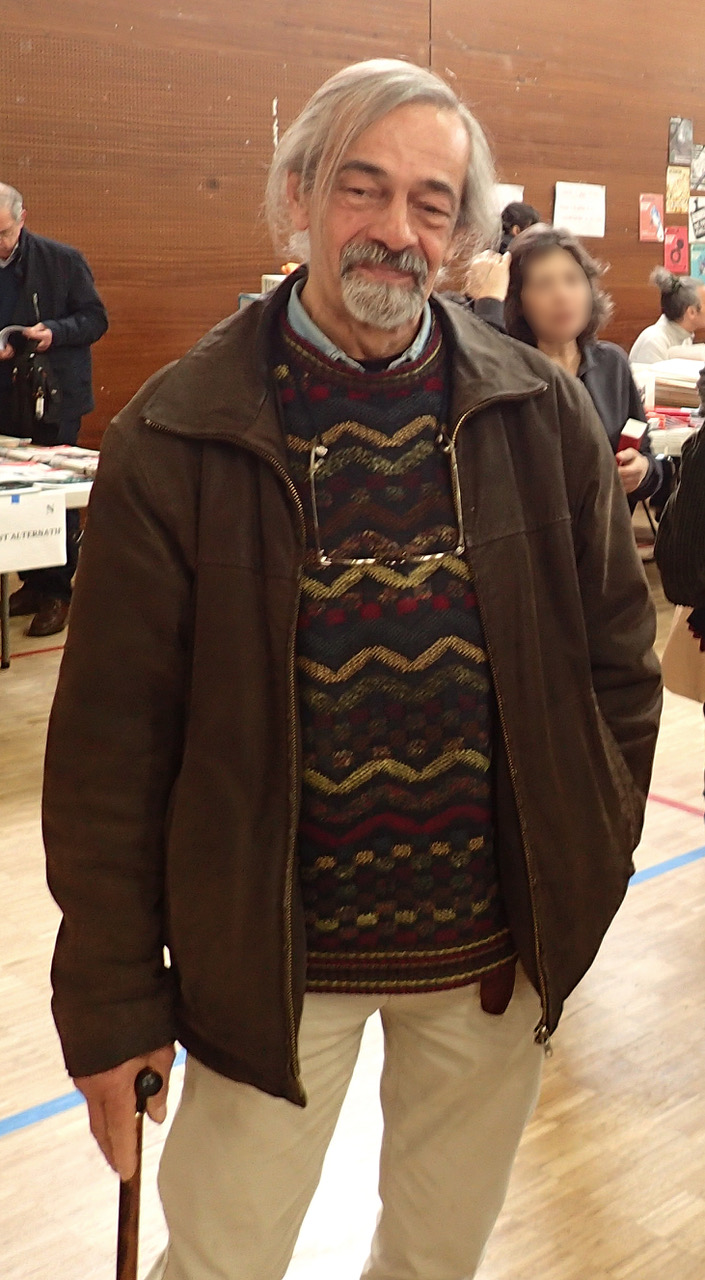
- Dupuy in 2017 at an anarchist bookfair
- Born: 26 June 1946; Paris, France
- Died: 23 October 2025 (aged 79); Nanterre, France
- Occupations: Historian, anarchist, educator for blind people, librarian
- Known for: Anarchist activism and his historical studies on anarchism
- Movement: Anarchism

Rolf Dupuy, his real name being Daniel Dupuy, (26 June 1946 – 25 October 2025) was a French educator for the blind, librarian, anarchist and historian of the anarchist movement in France and Spain.

During his youth, Dupuy joined the anarchist movement in France and opposed the Algerian War, particularly by fighting with nationalist or fascist groups demanding that French Algeria be maintained. Following a trip to Europe where he hitchhiked across the continent and joined the so-called beatnik movement, he returned to France, participated in May '68, and found a job as an educator of young blind people. The anarchist was one of the founders of the Revolutionary Anarchist Organization (RAO), where he held notable responsibilities - for example in the organization's international relations and through activity within several groups. He also published and edited numerous texts, particularly in Chinese. He took the pseudonym of Rolf while at the RAO and this nickname stayed to designate him.

His educator contract was not renewed after he participated in a strike, so Dupuy, became a librarian. He left the RAO in 1977 following disagreements over its pro-autonomist orientation, and subsequently dedicated himself to historical research on anarchism, while continuing his activism with the CNT.

As part of his research, he associated the International Center for Research on Anarchism (ICRA) with René Bianco and deposited many documents there, as well as at the International Institute of Social History (IISH).

Dupuy was involved in Le Maitron des anarchistes and, most notably, in the founding of the International Dictionary of Anarchist Activists (IDAA) and Los de la sierra 1936-1975: Dictionary of Anti-Franco Guerrillas and Resistance Fighters, which he subsequently managed.

== Biography ==
=== Youth, joining the anarchist movement and opposing French colonialism ===
Daniel Pierre Alexandre Dupuy was born in Paris on 26 June 1946. He began his political activism while attending the Lycée Louis-le-Grand, in 1961, when he joined the anarchist group there. He then decisively committed himself against the Algerian War by joining the Front of Solidarity with the Algerian Revolution (FSAR) and by fighting in the frequent street battles between anti-fascists and nationalists or fascists in favour of maintaining French Algeria.

After his studies, where he obtained his baccalaureate as a private candidate, he hitchhiked across Europe and joined the circles pejoratively referred to as beatniks. He also studied Oriental languages.

=== Continuation of his Activities: May '68, foundation of the RAO, anarchist activities ===
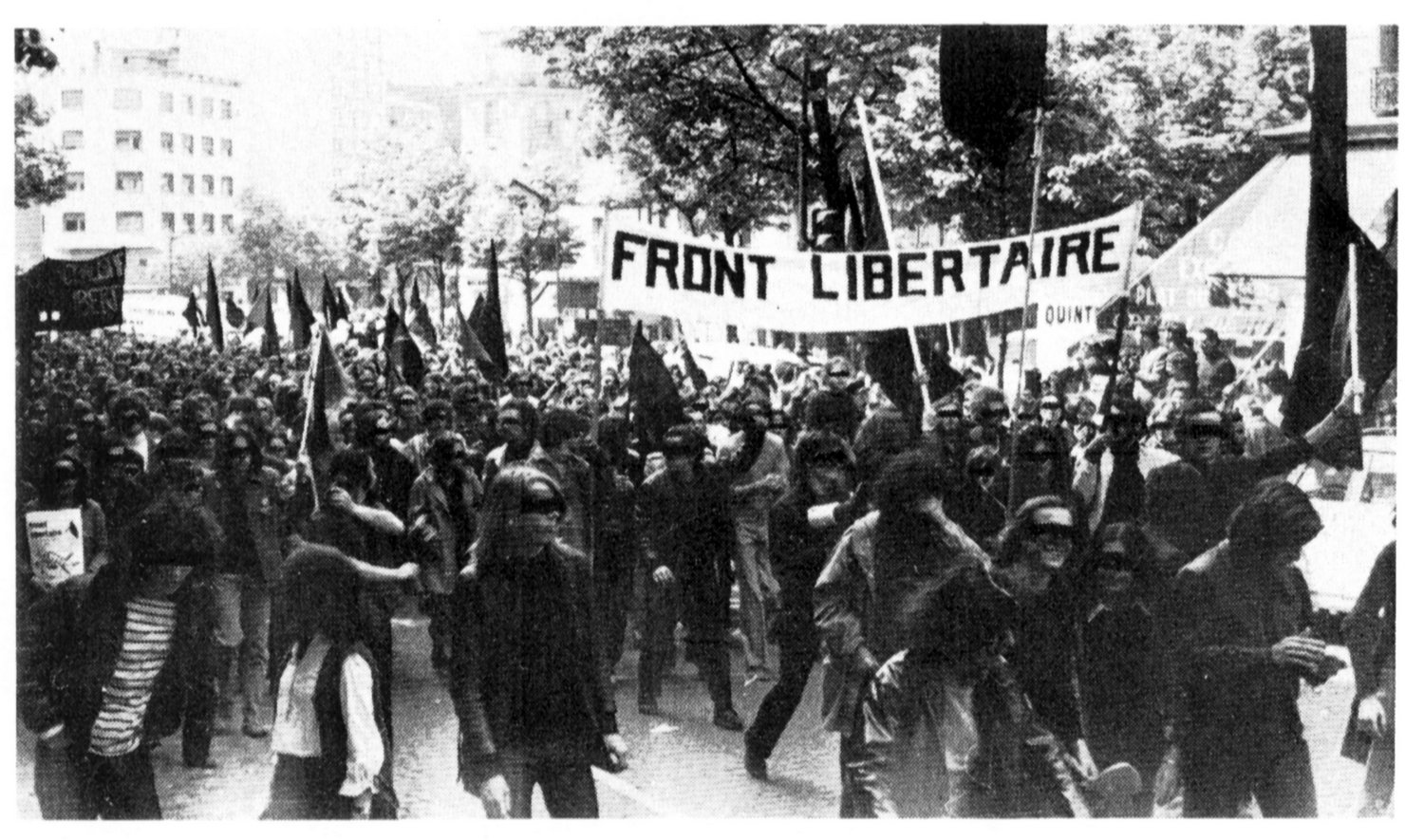
Demonstration of the RAO in Paris with the inscription 'Front Libertaire' on their banner

Dupuy returned to France and actively participated in May '68. During the occupation of the Sorbonne, in which he took part and was assigned to occupy Staircase E, he met many companions of the RAO there, including Guy Malouvier.

He defined himself as an anarcho-communist and found a job as an educator at the National Institute for Blind Youth (NIBY) after having held several precarious jobs.

According to historian Óscar Freán Hernández, the influence of Spanish anarchists was decisive for him; he joined the movement at a time when many refugees and veterans of the Spanish Civil War were still alive in France, and this memory marked him. This was also due to his reading, as he could find more texts at their premises on Rue Sainte-Marthe than at the French Anarchist Federation (FA) bookstore.

Rolf Dupuy was one of the founders of the Revolutionary Anarchist Organization (RAO) where he took the Rolf nickname and joined its Jules Vallès group in the 13th arrondissement of Paris. He became involved in this organization, and in 1971, became a member of its National Collective in charge of the group's international relations. He maintained the permanent presence of a press table for the organization between 1969 and 1972 at the Censier campus.

In parallel, he participated in the Cercle Front libertaire 'Chiens de garde' ('Guard Dogs') with Michel Cavalier and Ramon Finster, which published a bulletin (two issues were released) and distributed the newspaper Front libertaire on Rue Mouffetard.

Following his participation in a strike at the NIBY organized by the 'Angry Disabled People' group, his contract was not renewed, and he became unemployed. In 1973, he provided daily support to the picket line at the post office on Rue de l’Épée-de-Bois, where the local section of the CFDT was then anarchist. With Geneviève Pauly, Gérard Mélinand, and other RAO members, he founded the RAO's Mouffetard group, centered around the Maison pour tous ('House for All')—a meeting place for former Maoists and anarchists—which published the newspaper Le Cri du Vème.

Between 1973 and 1976, he was in charge of the RAO's Chinese anarcho-communist group, publishing bulletins and texts in Chinese. In 1974, the anarchist obtained a job as a librarian for the City of Paris. In 1977, Dupuy left the RAO (renamed the Libertarian Communist Organization) following disagreements over its new pro-autonomist orientation.

=== Historian of the anarchist movement ===
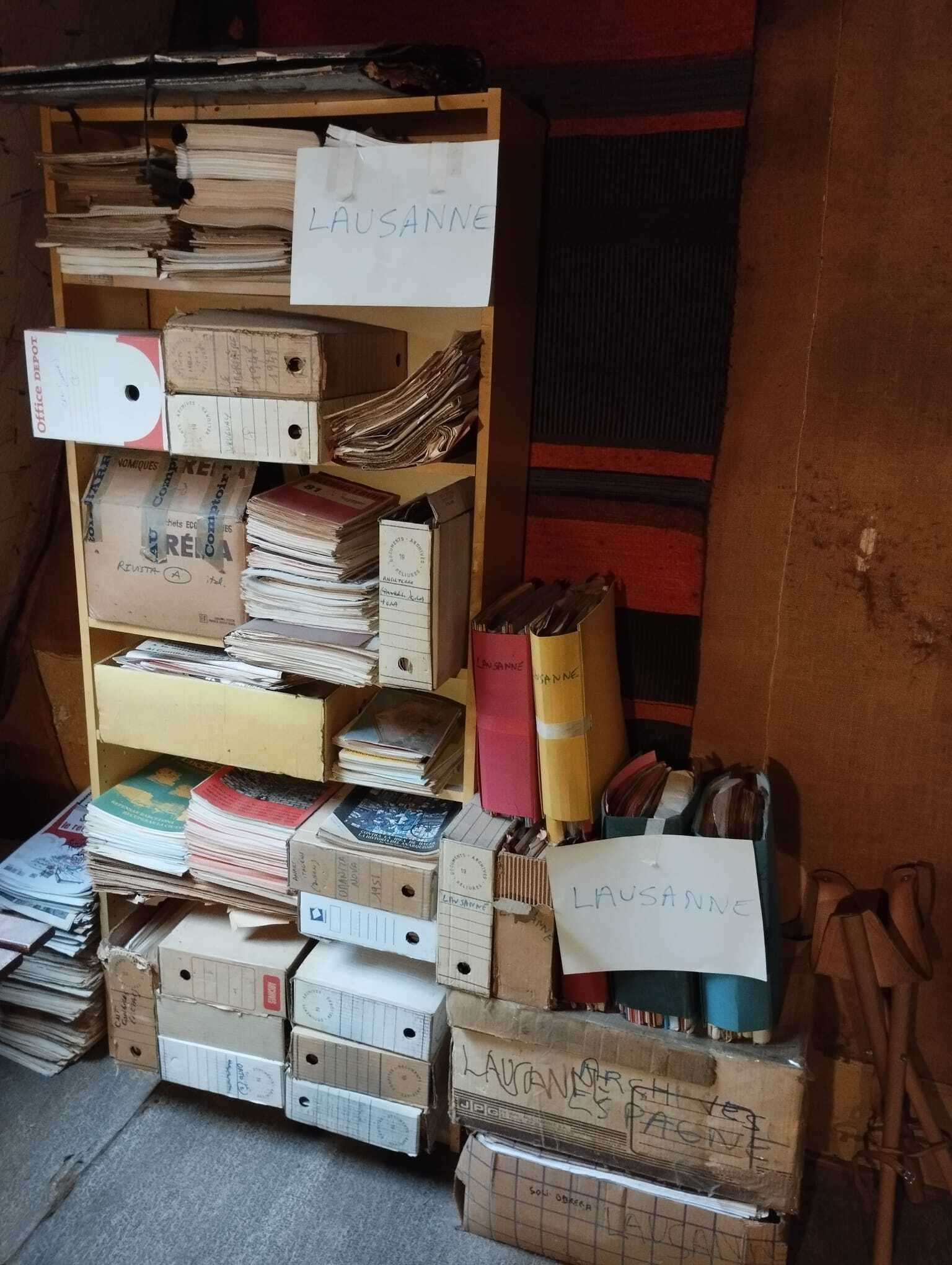
Parts of Rolf Dupuy's collections destined to the Lausanne ICRA.

He then decided to dedicate himself to historical research on anarchism and began collaborations with other historians of the movement, such as René Bianco and Antonio Tellez. The latter was a very close friend of Dupuy, and sent him documents and his research until the end of his life so that Dupuy could publish them online.

Rolf also actively participated in preserving the anarchist historical and cultural heritage, which he did notably by depositing numerous archives in preservation structures—he associated closely with the International Center for Research on Anarchism (ICRA) founded by René Bianco and deposited many documents there, as well as at the International Institute of Social History (IISH). These documents include the archives of Tellez, the archives concerning the Spanish Republicans deported to the USSR, and the archives of Marcel Geslin.

He also continued his activism, this time with the CNT, between 1985 and 2000. In 2007, he retired and subsequently founded the International Dictionary of Anarchist Activists (IDAA) with Bianco. He was its main organizer.

Dupuy died in Nanterre on 25 October 2025.

== Legacy ==
=== Historiography of the anarchist movement ===
As significant research initiatives, he wrote and researched a notable number of biographies presented in the Maitron des anarchistes. He was also the founder of two encyclopedic dictionaries: the International Dictionary of Anarchist Activists (IDAA) and Los de la sierra 1936-1975: Dictionary of Anti-Franco Guerrillas and Resistance Fighters.

The International Dictionary of Anarchist Activists (IDAA) was noted by historian Diego Celaya for presenting many interesting biographies of the anarchist Resistance in France against Nazism, particularly within the networks of CNT exiles in France.

The historian Amado Marcellán studied the biographies of several anarchist women through Dupuy's research and noted, among other things, that he applied a feminist treatment to certain elements of the biographies of the anarchists whose lives he researched and presented.

== Collections ==
- Project to save his collections and documents, led by Archives Anarchistes and other anarchists, uploaded to Commons.

== Bibliography ==
- Lenoir, Hugues (2024), DUPUY Daniel, Pierre, Alexandre [dit Rolf], Paris: Le Maitron
