= 1881 London Social Revolutionary Congress =

Anarchist meeting

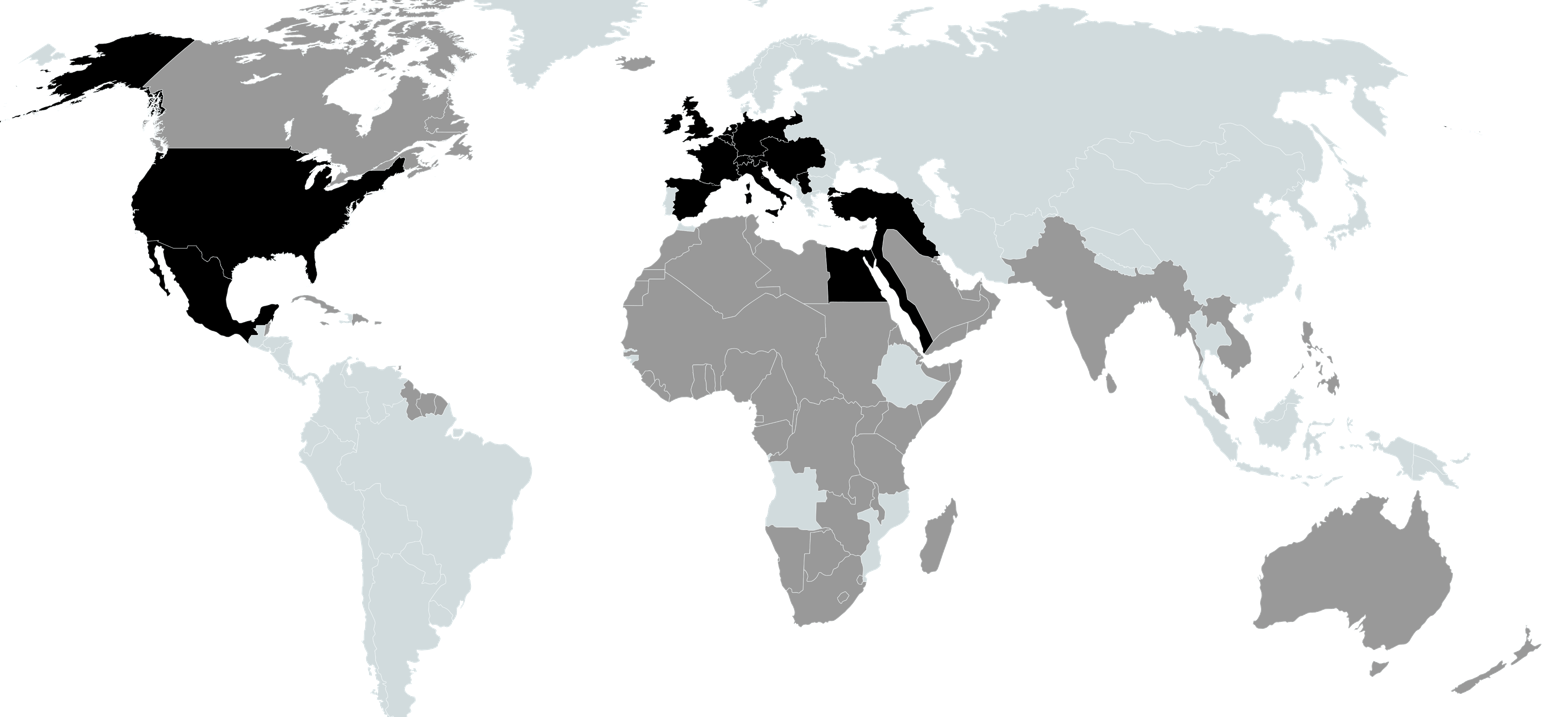
- In black, where delegates at the 1881 London Congress came from, in grey, what countries were part of the colonial empires of the countries sending delegates
- Date: 14–20 July 1881
- Location: London, United Kingdom
- Type: Political conference

The International Social Revolutionary Congress was an anarchist meeting in London between 14 and 20 July 1881, with the aim of founding a new international organisation for anti-authoritiarian socialists (i.e., anarchists). This organization became known as the Black International.

== Preparations ==
Planning for the London congress began following a small Brussels conference in 1880. The intent of the London meeting would be to explore founding an international organisation dedicated to anti-authoritarian and decentralist socialism. The congress had 45 delegates, including anarchist luminaries Peter Kropotkin, Errico Malatesta, and Louise Michel. Planned in secret, delegates were known by code number.

John Most, who contributed to the impetus for the meeting, ultimately did not attend from jail, having written in celebration of the assassination of Alexander II of Russia some weeks before the congress. The new Social Revolutionary outgrowths of the American Socialistic Labor Party did not send delegates but were represented in spirit by other delegates. Despite security measures, an attendee named Serreaux was later determined to have been an agent provocateur from the French police.

== Proceedings and results ==
The congress was ultimately unproductive, marred by bombastic speech and obsessive sensationalism related to Alexander II's assassination. Though the delegates moved to form a new international organisation based on autonomous federations, resuscitating the International Working Men's Association, the resulting Black International did not grow beyond a loose association of groups. The Black International had no central power, which would have conflicted with its federalist orientation, apart from a bureau of information, which itself did not last long. While governments would blame assassinations and terrorism on the Black International, the group truthfully held little organised power. A follow-up congress, planned for 1882, was abandoned.

== Primary sources ==
- Resolutions and debates in Le Révolté added to Wikisource (1)

== See also ==
- Marie Le Compte

== Bibliography ==
- Avrich, Paul (1984). The Haymarket Tragedy. Princeton University Press. ISBN 978-0-691-04711-9.
- Goyens, Tom (2007). Beer and Revolution: The German Anarchist Movement in New York City, 1880–1914. Urbana, Illinois: University of Illinois Press. ISBN 978-0-252-03175-5.
- Graham, Robert (2015). We Do Not Fear Anarchy, We Invoke It: The First International and the Origins of the Anarchist Movement. AK Press. ISBN 978-1-84935-211-6.
- Messer-Kruse, Timothy (2014). The Haymarket Conspiracy: Transatlantic Anarchist Networks. The Working Class in American History. Urbana, Illinois: University of Illinois Press. ISBN 978-0-252-09414-9.
- Woodcock, George (1990). Peter Kropotkin: From Prince to Rebel. Black Rose Books. ISBN 978-0-921689-60-7.
