= La Lutte (1883) =

1883 French anarchist newspaper

- Liberté, égalité, justice
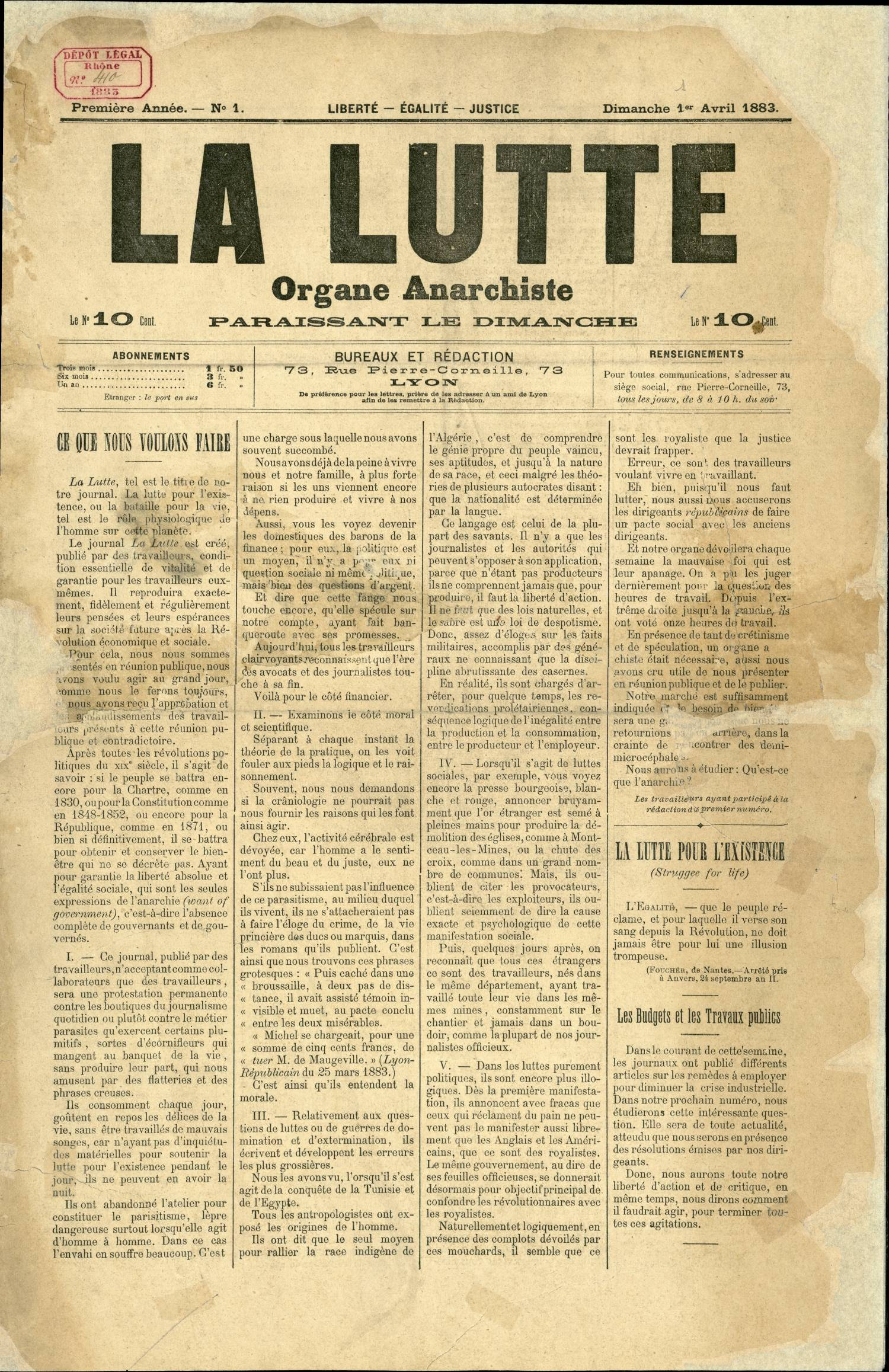
- Cover of the first issue
- Editor: Jules Boissy; Léon Domergue; Henri Tricot; Louis Chautant
- Founded: 1st April 1883
- Ceased publication: 5 August 1883
- Political alignment: Anarchism; Anarcho-communism
- Language: French
- Headquarters: Lyon, France

La Lutte (English: The Struggle) was an anarchist newspaper published in Lyon between April and August 1883. It succeeded L'Étendard révolutionnaire, which had been banned six months earlier, and preceded Le Drapeau noir.

As Lyon was a major hub for the anarchist movement during this period, they began establishing press organs that followed one after another amidst frequent bans and significant repression. Following the Assommoir bombing, the Trial of the 66 in early 1883, and the demonstration of 9 March 1883, Lyonnese anarchists founded a new journal, La Lutte. It managed to publish nineteen issues before being banned in its turn and replaced by Le Drapeau noir.

It belongs to the first period of the Lyon anarchist press, featuring a series of closely related newspapers that succeeded one another in the face of government bans, including Le Droit social, L'Étendard révolutionnaire, La Lutte, Le Drapeau noir, L'Émeute, Le Défi, L'Hydre anarchiste, L'Alarme, and Le Droit anarchique.

== History ==
=== Situation of anarchism in Lyon and first publications ===
Lyon and the Lyon region in general quickly became an important hub for anarchism—anarchists there formed a Lyonnese Federation. Lyonnese anarchists operated in a climate of repression and surveillance from the French authorities. However, in 1878, they decided to acquire a newspaper and founded a society, Le Droit social, intended to raise funds for the creation of an eponymous newspaper. Unfortunately for them, the law then required a deposit (cautionnement)—that is, a deposit of funds with the authorities—to be allowed to publish, which made such an initiative difficult for financial and practical reasons, as anarchist newspapers tended to be rapidly banned in France.

In 1882, following the new press freedom law of 1881, the situation changed with the suppression of this deposit requirement, and Le Droit social was founded in Lyon in February 1882. It was heavily monitored by the French authorities; every issue was sparingly analyzed, the special commissaire of Lyon sought to discover the precise authors of each article, and authorities initiated numerous prosecutions against the successive managers of the newspaper, which changed its name several times. It ceased publication on 23 July 1882 and was succeeded by L'Étendard révolutionnaire between August and October 1882.

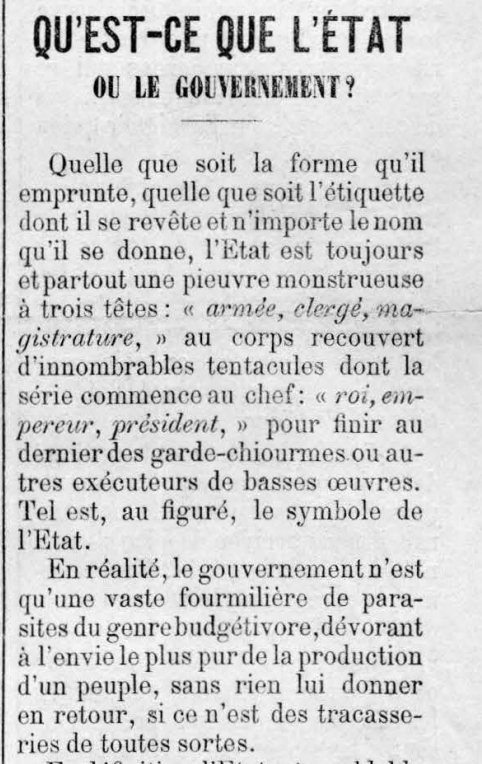
Start of 'What are the state and the government?' in La Lutte (N°10)

This newspaper was subsequently banned following the Assommoir bombing, and its manager, Antoine Cyvoct, was sentenced to death due to one of the journal's articles. The anarchist movement in France, and specifically in Lyon, was then severely targeted by repression, which culminated in January 1883 during the Trial of the 66.

=== La Lutte ===
On 1st April 1883, shortly after the anarchist demonstration of 9 March 1883, Lyonnese anarchists established a new newspaper under the title La Lutte ('The Struggle'). Historian René Bianco identifies the following individuals as the primary editors:

Jules Boissy, Léon Domergue, Henri Tricot, and Louis Chautant.

The newspaper printed its ninth issue on red paper to commemorate the Bloody Week. It also supported propaganda of the deed through a column titled Produits anti-bourgeois ('Anti-bourgeois products'), published from the fourteenth to the seventeenth issues, which provided methods for carrying out such actions. The journal published nineteen issues in total, leading to swift legal proceedings against the periodical's two managers, Morel and Chautant, before it was eventually banned.

It was replaced by Le Drapeau noir ('The Black Flag') the following week.

== Works ==
- Full collection on the Archives Autonomies website

== Bibliography ==
- Chambost, Anne-Sophie (2017), "" Nous ferons de notre pire… ". Anarchie, illégalisme … et lois scélérates" [«We’ll Do our Worse». Anarchy, Illegalism … and Evil Law], Droit et Cultures, 74 (2): 65–87, doi:10.4000/droitcultures.4264
