= L'Étendard révolutionnaire =

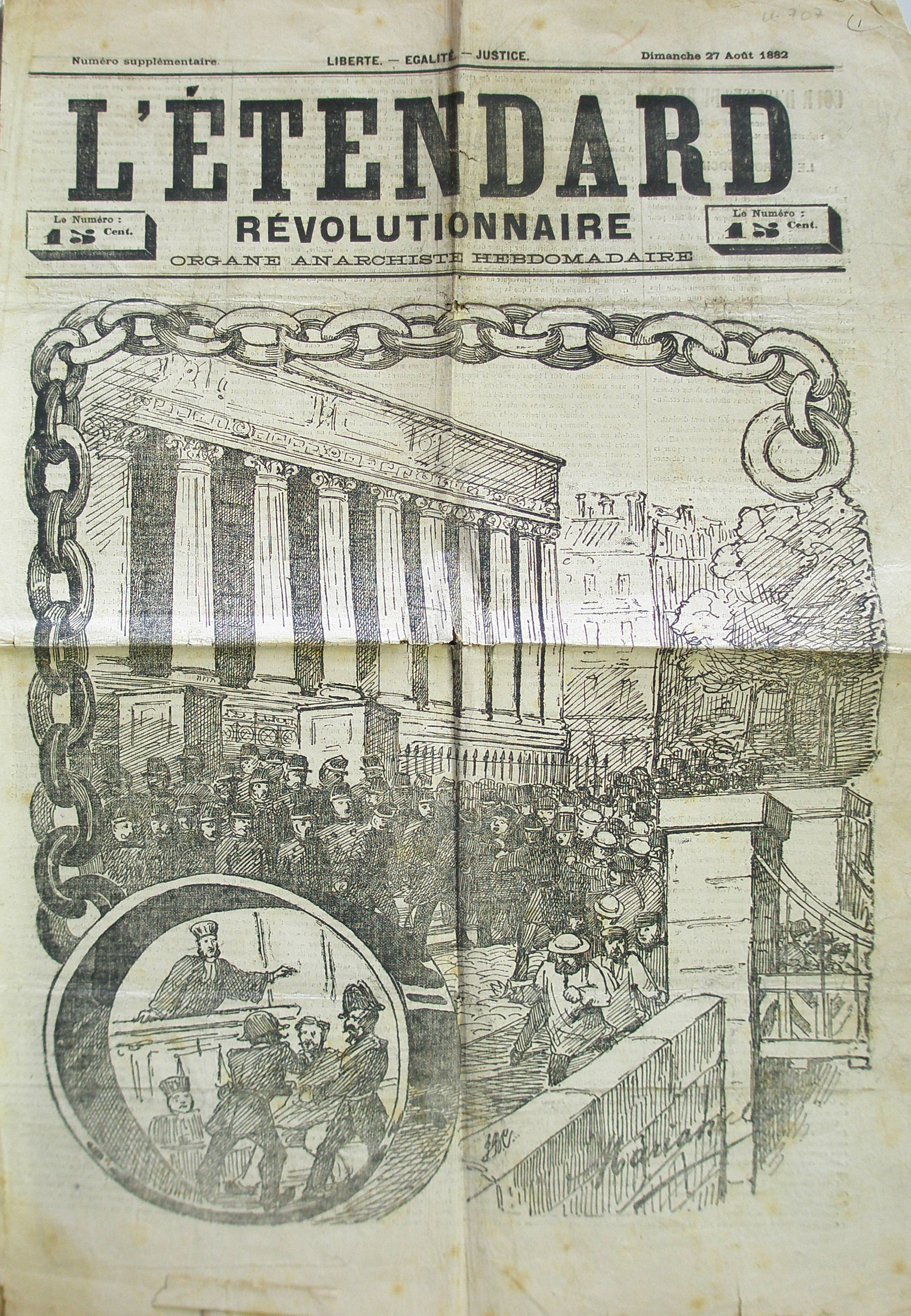
- Special issue of 27 August 1882, seized at the home of Gustave Delhorme, a suspected member of the Black Band, in Montceau-les-Mines
- Founder(s): Toussaint Bordat; Antoine Cyvoct; Louise Michel (?)
- Founded: 1882
- Ceased publication: 1882
- Political alignment: Anarchism; Anarcho-communism
- Language: French
- Headquarters: Lyon

L'Étendard révolutionnaire (English: 'The Revolutionary Standard') was an anarchist newspaper published in Lyon between July and October 1882. It succeeded Le Droit social, which had been interrupted one week before it began publishing, and with it, was one of the first anarchist publications in France after Serraux's La Révolution sociale (1880). It was succeeded by La Lutte the next year.

The newspaper brought together a number of prominent figures of anarchism in Lyon during this period, such as Toussaint Bordat and Antoine Cyvoct, who was one of its managers. It maintained links with the Black Band, which Bordat visited during the Montceau-les-Mines troubles and which published various statements in the newspaper including one where the group was one of the first to use the black flag as an anarchist symbol.

Following the Assommoir bombing in October 1882, publication ceased—partially because Cyvoct was on trial for the attack and because a major crackdown on anarchists was taking place in France, culminating in the Trial of the 66 in January 1883. Cyvoct was acquitted of the bombing but sentenced to death for allegedly writing an article that provoked it.

It belongs to the first period of the Lyon anarchist press, featuring a series of closely related newspapers that succeeded one another in the face of government bans, including Le Droit social, L'Étendard révolutionnaire, La Lutte, Le Drapeau noir, L'Émeute, Le Défi, L'Hydre anarchiste, L'Alarme, and Le Droit anarchique.

== History ==
=== Context ===
==== Birth and evolution of anarchism ====
The development of capitalism saw the formation of several opposing political ideologies and movements, particularly anarchism, Marxism, and socialism. Anarchists advocate for the struggle against all forms of domination perceived as unjust, among which is economic domination, with the development of capitalism. They are particularly opposed to the State, viewed as the institution enabling the endorsement of many of these dominations through its police, army, and propaganda.

Unlike the Marxists, who believed that achieving communism, where all goods are owned in common, would require retaining the State for a time—a supposedly transitional phase known as the dictatorship of the proletariat—anarchists like Bakunin considered this transitional phase highly problematic and leading instead towards dictatorship. Theoretical and personal oppositions on this subject, among others, between Bakunin and Marx led the latter to have the anarchists excluded from the First International at the Hague Congress (1872). Bakunin then gathered with other anarchists and founded the Anti-authoritarian International, a federation seeking to bring anarchists together and allow them to act and think collectively; one of its important branches was the Jura Federation, founded in the Swiss Jura and which spread around its region.

==== Situation of anarchism in Lyon ====
Lyon and the Lyon region in general quickly became an important hub for anarchism—anarchists there formed Lyonnese Federation. Lyonnese anarchists operated in a climate of repression and surveillance from the French authorities. However, in 1878, they decided to acquire a newspaper and founded a society, Le Droit social, intended to raise funds for the creation of an eponymous newspaper. Unfortunately for them, the law then required a deposit (cautionnement)—that is, a deposit of funds with the authorities—to be allowed to publish, which made such an initiative difficult for financial and practical reasons, as anarchist newspapers tended to be rapidly banned in France.

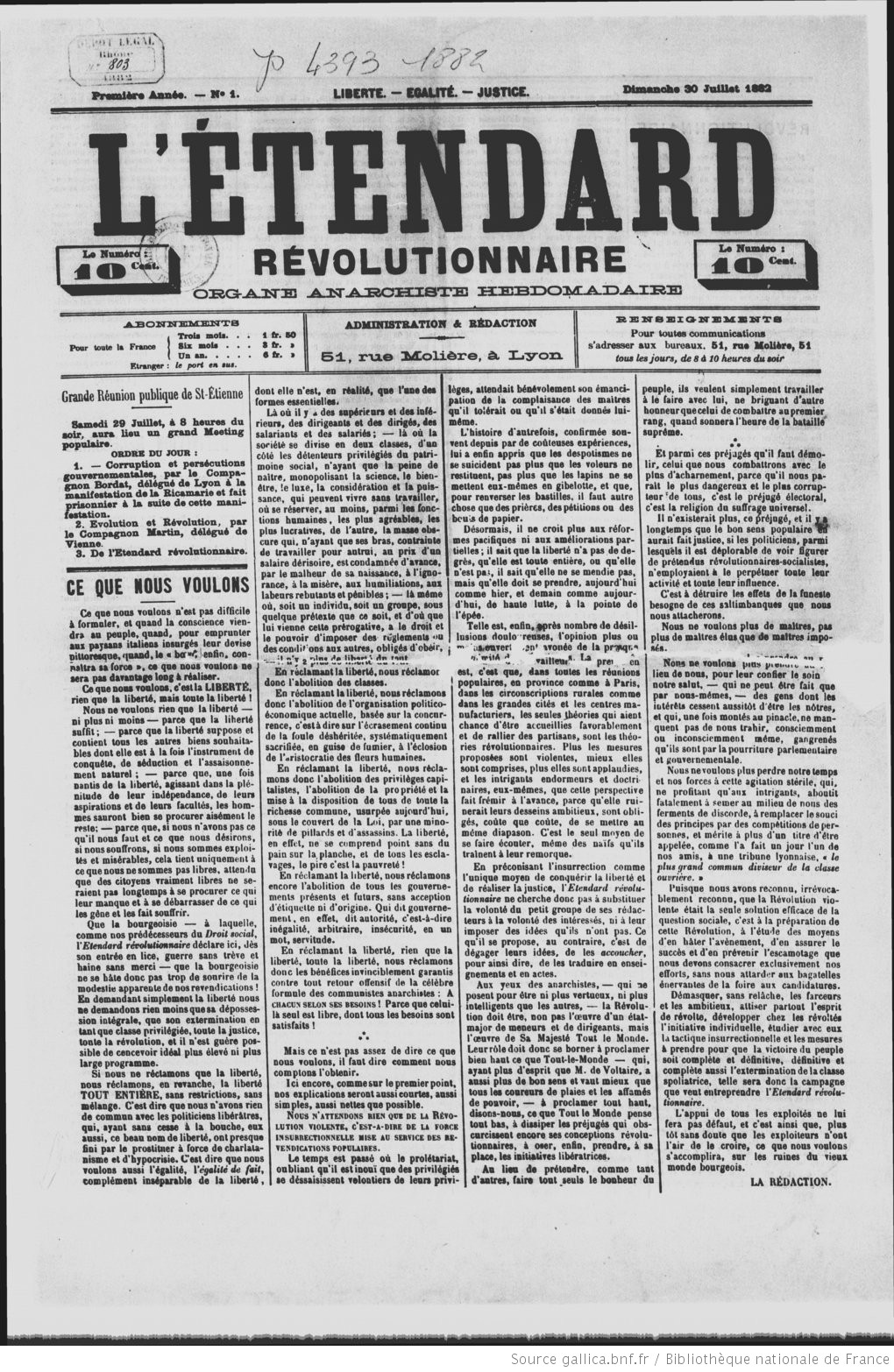
First issue of L'Étendard révolutionnaire (30 July 1882)

In 1882, following the new press freedom law of 1881, the situation changed with the suppression of this deposit requirement, and Le Droit social was founded in Lyon in February 1882. It was heavily monitored by the French authorities; every issue was sparingly analyzed, the special commissaire of Lyon sought to discover the precise authors of each article, and authorities initiated numerous prosecutions against the successive managers of the newspaper, which changed its name several times. It ceased publication on 23 July 1882.

=== L'Étendard révolutionnaire ===
The first issue of L'Étendard révolutionnaire was published one week after the previous newspaper ceased publication, on 30 July 1882. No articles were signed, but the following anarchists—a group thought to be close or identical to that of Le Droit social—are believed to have contributed to the newspaper:

Félicien Bonnet, Toussaint Bordat, Jean Marie Bourdon, Jean Antoine Coindre, Joseph Cottaz, Claude Crestin, Antoine Cyvoct, Joseph Damians, François Dejoux, Nicolas Didelin (who was a second cousin of Louise Michel), Régis Faure, Georges Garraud, César Mathon, Hyacinthe Trenta, Joseph Trenta.

The printer in charge was Pastel, who collaborated with the French authorities to transmit information about the newspaper. The publication, through Toussaint Bordat, was linked to the Black Band and the Montceau-les-Mines troubles: the newspaper thus published several communiqués from the Black Band including one in which it used the black flag as a symbol, eight months before the demonstration of 9 March 1883 where Louise Michel displayed this flag and made it a central symbol of the anarchist movement. Bordat also traveled personally to Montceau-les-Mines and spoke publicly there in support of the miners.

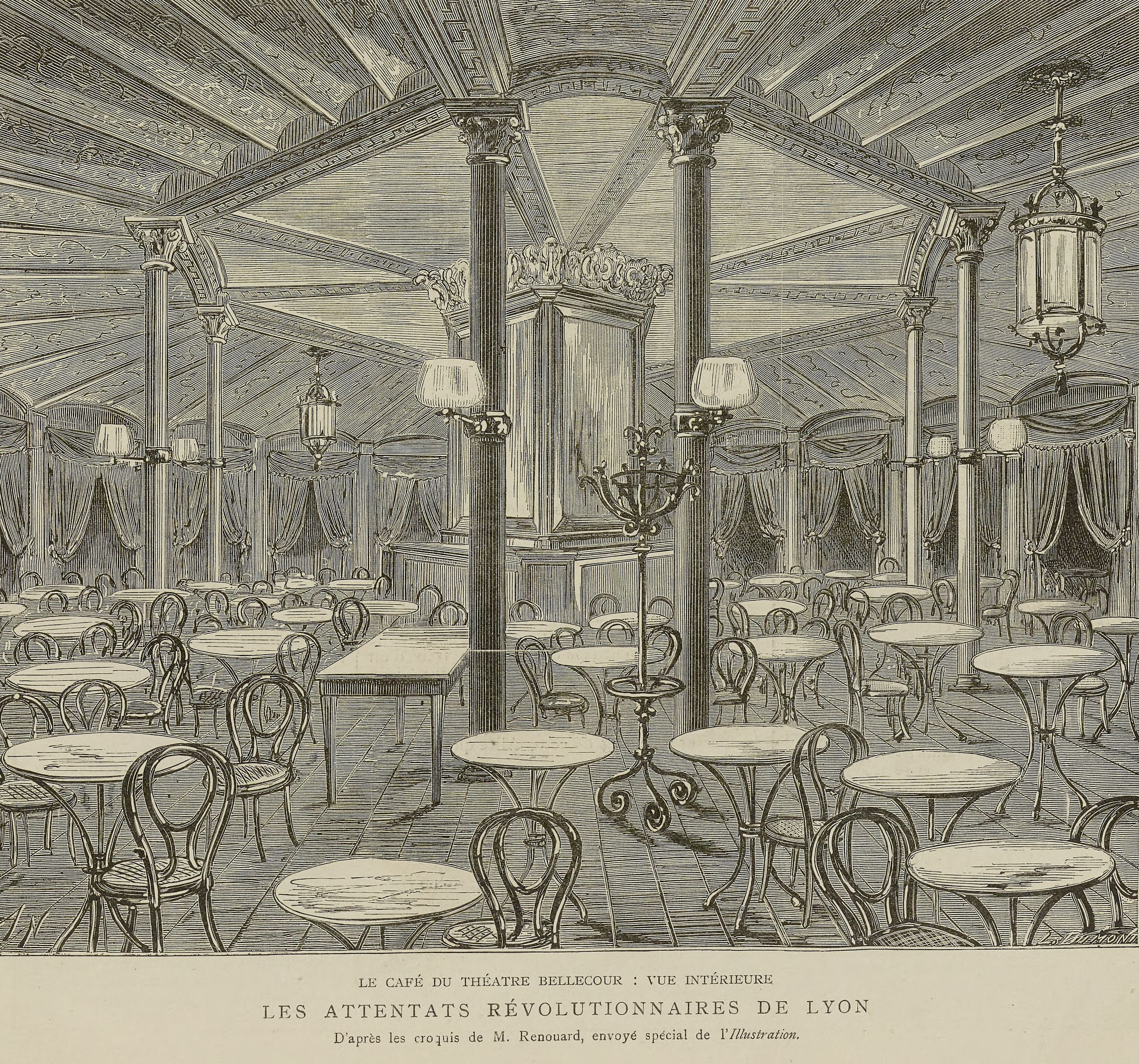
Assomoir bombing in L'Illustration (4 November 1882)

Lyon was particularly volatile at the time, especially since the city was affected by a widespread famine—children had to go to the barracks to beg the soldiers for bread for their families. On 19 August 1882, four days after the riot or revolt launched by the Black Band in Montceau-les-Mines, the premises of L'Étendard révolutionnaire were raided. Repression against the publication increased in the following months, as the Black Band continued its attacks and the trial of the first arrested individuals approached—the Lyonnese movement was heavily repressed.

In October 1882, while the trial of those accused of the Black Band riot had been underway for six days, the Assomoir bombing occurred on 23 October—when an assailant attacked a restaurant associated with the Lyonnese bourgeoisie by throwing a bomb. A person who tried to extinguish the burning projectile had their legs pulverized and died from their injuries four days later. A second attack occurred the same day against a barracks in Lyon.

This date corresponds to the last publication of L'Étendard révolutionnaire, which then ceased. Its manager at the time, Antoine Cyvoct, was indeed accused by the French authorities of being primarily responsible for the attack—he allegedly named the restaurant in an article and was supposedly in Lyon at the time of the events. He denied these claims—including after his release fourteen years later—maintaining that he was in Switzerland at the time, not Lyon, and that he was not the author of the incriminating article. He was tried, acquitted of participation in the attack, but found to be the author of the incriminating press article and sentenced to death for this article. This sentence was later commuted to life imprisonment in the penal colony before he was released in 1897. In parallel, the Trial of the 66 in early 1883 was the climax of this episode of significant repression affecting the anarchist movement in France.

According to Bordat, Bonthoux, and Daman himself, Daman was allegedly the signatory of the incriminating article—it is possible that Valadier was the author.

In total, L'Étendard révolutionnaire published 12 issues and gave way to other subsequent press titles, like La Lutte.

== Publications ==
- 12 issues of the normal series published on Gallica here. (the black flag is used several times but the first one on 3 September 1882)
- Manifesto of the newspaper in favour of anarcho-communism, insurrection and revolution, in the first issue, available on Wikisource. (French original)

Collection from the archive-site Archives Anarchistes published on Commons and including:

- Special issue of 27 August 1882, seized at the home of Gustave Delhorme, a suspected member of the Black Band, in Montceau-les-Mines (AD de Saône-et-Loire - 2 U 707)

== Bibliography ==
- Beaubernard, Robert (1981), Montceau-les-Mines: Un laboratoire social au XIXe siècle [Montceau-les-Mines: A social laboratory in the 19th century], Avallon: Éditions de Civry, p. 316, ISBN 978-2-85983-024-3
- Berthier, René (2015), La fin de la première Internationale [The end of the First Internationale] (in French), Paris: Le Monde Libertaire, ISBN 978-2915514636
- Chambost, Anne-Sophie (2017), "" Nous ferons de notre pire… ". Anarchie, illégalisme … et lois scélérates" [«We’ll Do our Worse». Anarchy, Illegalism … and Evil Law], Droit et Cultures, 74 (2): 65–87, doi:10.4000/droitcultures.4264
- Jourdain, Edouard (2013). L'anarchisme [Anarchism]. Paris: La Découverte. ISBN 978-2-7071-9091-8.
- Ward, Colin (2004). Anarchism: A Very Short Introduction. Oxford University Press (OUP).
