= Le Drapeau noir =

1883 French anarchist newspaper

- Liberté, égalité, justice
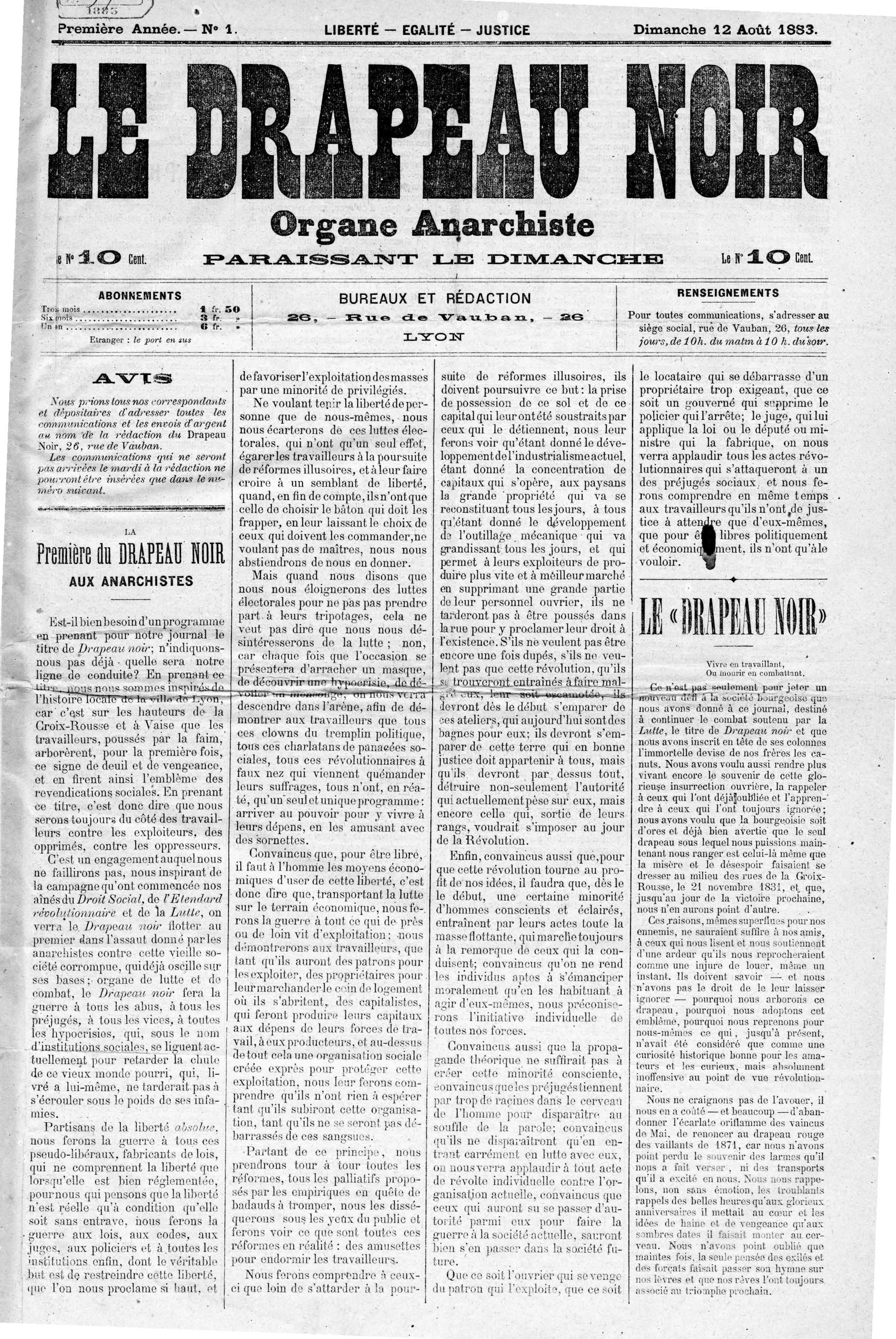
- Cover of the first issue of the newspaper
- Founder(s): Auguste Baudry; Clovis Demure; Léon Domergue; Marius Monfray; Vitre
- Founded: 12 August 1883
- Ceased publication: 2 December 1883
- Political alignment: Anarchism; Anarcho-communism
- Language: French
- Headquarters: Lyon

Le Drapeau noir (English: The Black Flag) was an anarchist newspaper published in Lyon between August and December 1883. It succeeded La Lutte, which had been banned shortly before publication began and preceded L'Émeute. It is best known for being the first anarchist periodical to use the black flag as its title, before the symbol became widespread across the entire movement.

During this period, Lyon was a major hub for the anarchist movement. They began establishing various press organs that succeeded one another amidst frequent bans and heavy government repression. Alongside these developments, the black flag—originally a symbol of the Canuts—began to permeate anarchist circles and was featured in L'Étendard révolutionnaire, a publication that preceded Le Drapeau noir.

In August 1883, shortly after the trial of Louise Michel for brandishing the flag during a demonstration, the newspaper was founded and adopted the symbol as its title. It continued publication until December 1883, when it was banned and replaced by the next anarchist organ, L'Émeute.

It belongs to the first period of the Lyon anarchist press, featuring a series of closely related newspapers that succeeded one another in the face of government bans, including Le Droit social, L'Étendard révolutionnaire, La Lutte, Le Drapeau noir, L'Émeute, Le Défi, L'Hydre anarchiste, L'Alarme, and Le Droit anarchique.

== History ==
=== Situation of anarchism in Lyon and the black flag ===
Lyon and the Lyon region in general quickly became an important hub for anarchism—anarchists there formed a Lyonnese Federation. Lyonnese anarchists operated in a climate of repression and surveillance from the French authorities. However, in 1878, they decided to acquire a newspaper and founded a society, Le Droit social, intended to raise funds for the creation of an eponymous newspaper. Unfortunately for them, the law then required a deposit (cautionnement)—that is, a deposit of funds with the authorities—to be allowed to publish, which made such an initiative difficult for financial and practical reasons, as anarchist newspapers tended to be rapidly banned in France.

In 1882, following the new press freedom law of 1881, the situation changed with the suppression of this deposit requirement, and Le Droit social was founded in Lyon in February 1882. It was heavily monitored by the French authorities; every issue was sparingly analyzed, the special commissaire of Lyon sought to discover the precise authors of each article, and authorities initiated numerous prosecutions against the successive managers of the newspaper, which changed its name several times. It ceased publication on 23 July 1882 and was succeeded by L'Étendard révolutionnaire between August and October 1882.

This newspaper was subsequently banned following the Assommoir bombing, and its manager, Antoine Cyvoct, was sentenced to death due to one of the journal's articles. The anarchist movement in France, and specifically in Lyon, was then severely targeted by repression, which culminated in January 1883 during the Trial of the 66.

Alongside these legal developments and the ongoing repression, the black flag—an old symbol of the Lyon canuts—began to be reused by Lyonnese anarchists. In 1881, the companion Claude Bernard defended its use during a meeting, and it was used again by the Black Band in 1882 in L'Étendard révolutionnaire. Finally, during the demonstration of 9 March 1883, Louise Michel brandished the flag, making the front page of several newspapers with this symbol, which she later defended during her trial.

=== Le Drapeau noir ===
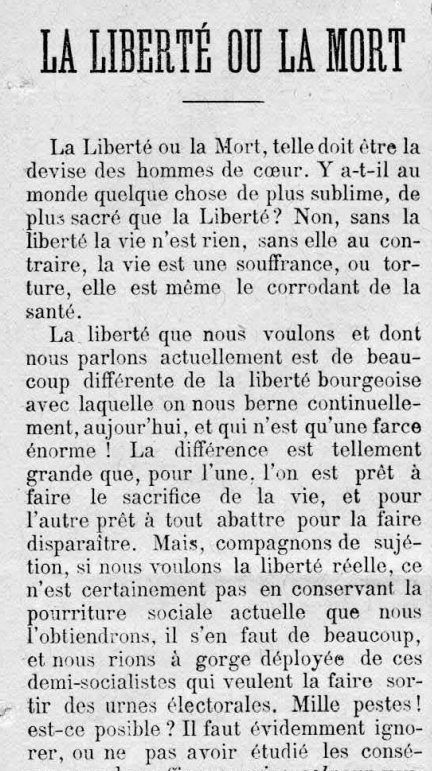
Article 'Freedom or death' in Le Drapeau noir (N°13)

In Lyon itself, several anarchists established a new press organ titled La Lutte ('The Struggle'). Like its predecessors, it was quickly prosecuted and banned. Shortly thereafter, the newspaper Le Drapeau noir ('The Black Flag') was founded as the successor to La Lutte.

Its motto, like that of the previous title, was 'Liberty, Equality, Justice'. Aligning itself with previous Lyonnese anarchist publications, it announced that it was adopting the black flag as its emblem, this time distancing itself more overtly from the socialist red flag:

Daily events and facts have shown us clearly that the red flag, so glorious in defeat, could very well, in victory, cover the ambitious dreams of a few low-level schemers with its flaming folds. Since it has already sheltered a government and served as the banner of a constituted authority, we realized that for us—the daily undisciplined and the hourly rebels—it could be nothing more than an embarrassment or a lure.

Among the reasons for choosing the black flag, the connection to the Canuts was defended clearly and explicitly in the very first issue.

According to historian René Bianco, the journal's collaborators included Auguste Baudry, Clovis Demure, Léon Domergue, Marius Monfray, and the anarchist Vitre.

The newspaper, which released its first issue on 12 August 1883, published a total of 17 issues until 2 December 1883. Following the legal proceedings brought against it, it gave way to the next Lyonnese publication, L'Émeute ('The Riot').

== Legacy ==
=== Influence on the adoption of the black flag as an anarchist symbol ===
According to historian Guillaume Davranche, the black flag became a privilegied symbol of the anarchist movement following Louise Michel's demonstration and the founding of this newspaper, which was actually the first anarchist publication to bear that name.

== Works ==
- Full collection on the Archives Autonomies website

== Bibliography ==
- Baylac, Marie-Hélène (2024), Louise Michel, Paris: Perrin, ISBN 978-2262097714
- Bébin, Lionel (1996), Les tentatives de reconstituer la Première Internationale et les débuts du mouvement anarchiste à Lyon (mémoire) [The Attempts to Reconstruct the First International and the Beginnings of the Anarchist Movement in Lyon, 1871–1881 (memoir)], Lyon: University Lyon II
- Chambost, Anne-Sophie (2017), "" Nous ferons de notre pire… ". Anarchie, illégalisme … et lois scélérates" [«We’ll Do our Worse». Anarchy, Illegalism … and Evil Law], Droit et Cultures, 74 (2): 65–87, doi:10.4000/droitcultures.4264
- Davranche, Guillaume (2020), Dix questions sur l'anarchisme [Ten questions on anarchism] (in French), Montreuil: Libertalia, ISBN 978-2-37729-119-9
