= Le Droit social =

- Liberté, égalité, justice
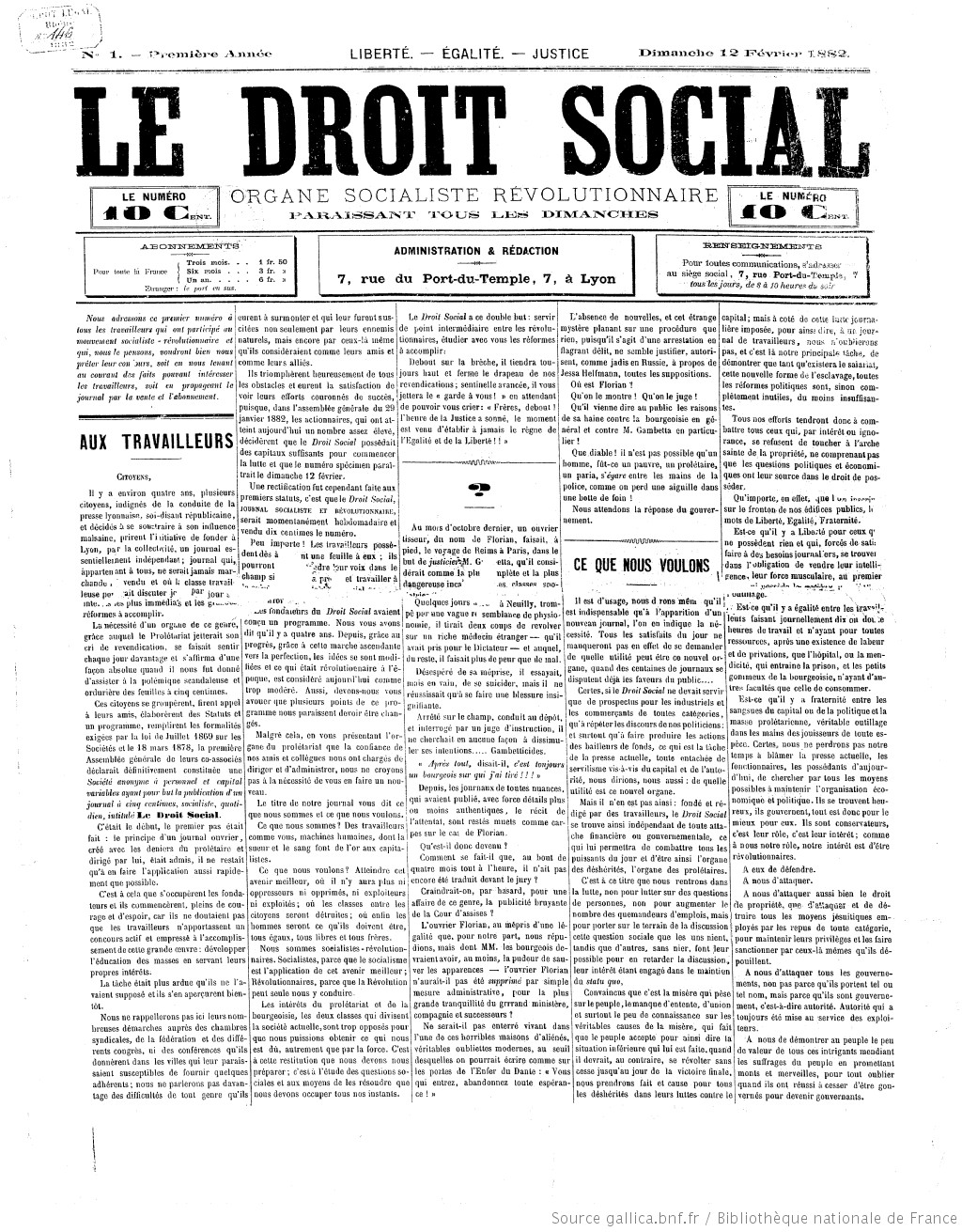
- Cover of an issue of the newspaper
- Founder(s): Louise Michel; Élisée Reclus; Jean Grave; Toussaint Bordat; Antoine Cyvoct
- Founded: 12 February 1882
- Ceased publication: 23 July 1882
- Political alignment: Anarchism; Anarcho-communism
- Language: French
- Headquarters: Lyon, France

Le Droit social (English: Social Rights) was an anarchist newspaper published in Lyon between February and July 1882. It was the second anarchist publication in the history of France, following Égide Spilleux's La Révolution sociale in 1880. After it was banned, it was succeeded by L'Étendard révolutionnaire.

During this period, Lyon was a major center for the anarchist movement. They began establishing press outlets there, which followed one another in quick succession due to frequent bans and significant state repression. The newspaper brought together a large number of prominent figures from the anarchist movement in Lyon and across France, including Louise Michel, Élisée Reclus, Toussaint Bordat, Antoine Cyvoct, and Jean Grave.

It marked the first publication of the first period of the Lyon anarchist press, featuring a series of closely related newspapers that succeeded one another in the face of government bans, including Le Droit social, L'Étendard révolutionnaire, La Lutte, Le Drapeau noir, L'Émeute, Le Défi, L'Hydre anarchiste, L'Alarme, and Le Droit anarchique.

== History ==
=== Situation of anarchism in Lyon and desire for publications ===
Lyon and the Lyon region in general quickly became an important hub for anarchism—anarchists there formed a Lyonnese Federation. Lyonnese anarchists operated in a climate of repression and surveillance from the French authorities.

However, in 1878, they decided to acquire a newspaper and founded a society, Le Droit social, intended to raise funds for the creation of an eponymous newspaper. Unfortunately for them, the law then required a deposit (cautionnement)—that is, a deposit of funds with the authorities—to be allowed to publish, which made such an initiative difficult for financial and practical reasons, as anarchist newspapers tended to be rapidly banned in France.

=== Le Droit social ===
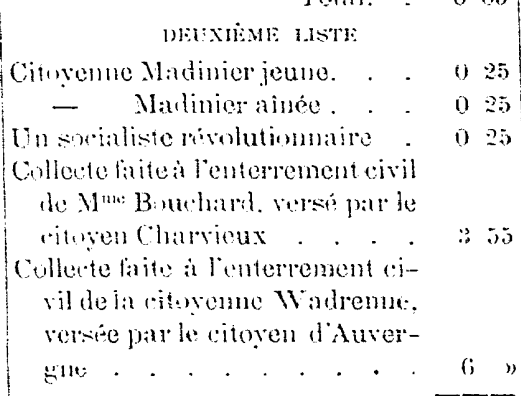
Fanny and Virginie Madignier in Le Droit social, noted as subscribers

In 1882, following the new press freedom law of 1881, the situation changed with the suppression of this deposit requirement, and Le Droit social was founded in Lyon in February 1882. It was heavily monitored by the French authorities; every issue was sparingly analyzed, the special commissaire of Lyon sought to discover the precise authors of each article, and authorities initiated numerous prosecutions against the successive managers of the newspaper.

It was the second anarchist publication in France, following La Révolution sociale by Égide Spilleux (1880). The newspaper brought together a significant number of anarchist figures in France during this period; historian René Bianco identifies the following names as likely participants in Le Droit social:

Bonthoux, Denechère, Gustave Falies, Émile Gautier, Jean Grave, Louise Michel, Lucien Pemjean, Élisée Reclus, A. Tressaud, Vermesch, Félicien Bonnet, [Toussaint] Bordat, Chavrier, Claude Crestin, Antoine Crié, [Antoine] Cyvoct, J. Damians, F. and L. Dejoux, Dervieux, Feuillade, Georges Garraud, Genoud, Jules Morel, Thomas, Charles Voisin, etc.

The newspaper adopted the motto 'Liberty, equality, justice', which all subsequent titles in the 'Lyon series' would later use. According to Bianco, the managers were Louis Dejoux, followed by Bonthoux after the former was sentenced to one year in prison. In its fourth issue, the journal listed the names of 15 secretaries of the Lyonese Federation; it also published communications from various anarchist groups across France, particularly from anarchist women's groups.

Le Droit social also distributed brochures, printing some of its articles in this format and selling them for 15 cents each. The publication was banned on 23 July 1882 and was replaced the following week by L'Étendard révolutionnaire.

== Works ==
- Full collection on the Archives Autonomies website

== Bibliography ==
- Chambost, Anne-Sophie (2017), "" Nous ferons de notre pire… ". Anarchie, illégalisme … et lois scélérates" [«We’ll Do our Worse». Anarchy, Illegalism … and Evil Law], Droit et Cultures, 74 (2): 65–87, doi:10.4000/droitcultures.4264
