= Le Défi (newspaper) =

1884 French anarchist newspaper

- Liberté, égalité, justice
- Cover of the first issue of the newspaper
- Founder(s): G. Robert; J. M. Frénéa
- Founded: 3 February 1884
- Ceased publication: 17 February 1884
- Political alignment: Anarchism; Anarcho-communism
- Language: French
- Headquarters: 28 rue Guillotière, Lyon

Le Défi (English: The Challenge/The Defiance) was an anarchist newspaper published in Lyon in February 1884. It succeeded L'Émeute, which had been banned a week earlier, and preceded L'Hydre anarchiste.

During a period when Lyon was a major hub for the anarchist movement, they began establishing press outlets that followed one after another in response to frequent bans and significant repression. Following the prohibition of their previous organ, L'Émeute, they founded a new journal titled Le Défi ; it managed to remain in print for about fifteen days before being banned in its turn.

It belongs to the first period of the Lyon anarchist press, featuring a series of closely related newspapers that succeeded one another in the face of government bans, including Le Droit social, L'Étendard révolutionnaire, La Lutte, Le Drapeau noir, L'Émeute, Le Défi, L'Hydre anarchiste, L'Alarme, and Le Droit anarchique.

== History ==
=== Situation of anarchism in Lyon and first publications ===
Lyon and the Lyon region in general quickly became an important hub for anarchism—anarchists there formed a Lyonnese Federation. Lyonnese anarchists operated in a climate of repression and surveillance from the French authorities. However, in 1878, they decided to acquire a newspaper and founded a society, Le Droit social, intended to raise funds for the creation of an eponymous newspaper. Unfortunately for them, the law then required a deposit (cautionnement)—that is, a deposit of funds with the authorities—to be allowed to publish, which made such an initiative difficult for financial and practical reasons, as anarchist newspapers tended to be rapidly banned in France.

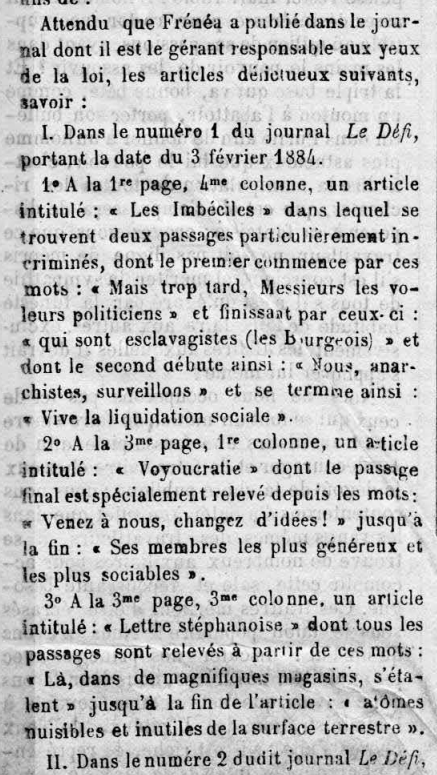
Le Défi providing a copy of the indictment against its manager, Frénéa, before the Rhône Assize Court (N°3)

In 1882, following the new press freedom law of 1881, the situation changed with the suppression of this deposit requirement, and Le Droit social was founded in Lyon in February 1882. It was heavily monitored by the French authorities; every issue was sparingly analyzed, the special commissaire of Lyon sought to discover the precise authors of each article, and authorities initiated numerous prosecutions against the successive managers of the newspaper, which changed its name several times. It ceased publication on 23 July 1882 and was succeeded by L'Étendard révolutionnaire between August and October 1882.

This newspaper was subsequently banned following the Assommoir bombing, and its manager, Antoine Cyvoct, was sentenced to death due to one of the journal's articles. The anarchist movement in France, and specifically in Lyon, was then severely targeted by repression, which culminated in January 1883 during the Trial of the 66. In Lyon itself, several anarchists established a new press organ titled La Lutte ('The Struggle'). Like its predecessors, it was quickly prosecuted and banned. Shortly thereafter, the newspaper Le Drapeau noir ('The Black Flag'), which followed La Lutte, was founded in August 1883 and ran until December 1883. It suffered the same fate as its predecessors and was succeeded by L’Émeute ('The Riot') from December 1883 to January 1884.

=== Le Défi ===
Following the ban on L’Émeute, Lyon's anarchists established a new newspaper titled Le Défi ('The Challenge/The Defiance'). The articles were either unsigned or published under pseudonyms; however, historian René Bianco managed to identify two of the publication's managers, J. M. Frenea and G. Robert. Frenea was prosecuted as early as the second issue for articles published in the paper.

The newspaper was printed at 28 Rue de la Guillotière.

After it was banned following its third issue on 17 February 1884, the publication was succeeded by L'Hydre anarchiste ('The Anarchist Hydra').

== Works ==
Collection of the site-archive Archives Anarchistes uploaded to Commons and comprising:

- Full collection

== Bibliography ==
- Chambost, Anne-Sophie (2017), "" Nous ferons de notre pire… ". Anarchie, illégalisme … et lois scélérates" [«We’ll Do our Worse». Anarchy, Illegalism … and Evil Law], Droit et Cultures, 74 (2): 65–87, doi:10.4000/droitcultures.4264
