= Anarchist black flag =

Anarchist symbol

- Adopted: 9 March 1883; 143 years ago
- Designed by: Canuts - Black Band - Louise Michel

The black flag or the anarchist black flag is one of the central and traditional symbols of the anarchist movement. Originating from the Canuts Revolt in 1831, the symbol was increasingly adopted within the workers' movement, particularly in the Lyon region, and was flown during the Lyon Commune. In the early 1880s, while the anarchist movement was still undergoing its ideological constitution, the symbol began to be used by the Black Band and, above all, by Louise Michel, who displayed it during the demonstration of 9 March 1883.

Following this use by Michel, the black flag rapidly spread within anarchist circles and became a central symbol of the movement on an international scale. This is notably due to the flag's polysemy, which signifies both mourning for the Canuts Revolt and past workers' revolts, hunger, the people's joy and anger, the absence of State or nation, but also the fact that it allowed anarchists to distinguish themselves from socialists and their red flag.

The black flag is shared by almost all anarchists, and exists in various derived variations like in bisected flags such as the red and black flag.

== History ==
=== Context ===
==== Birth of the anarchist movement ====
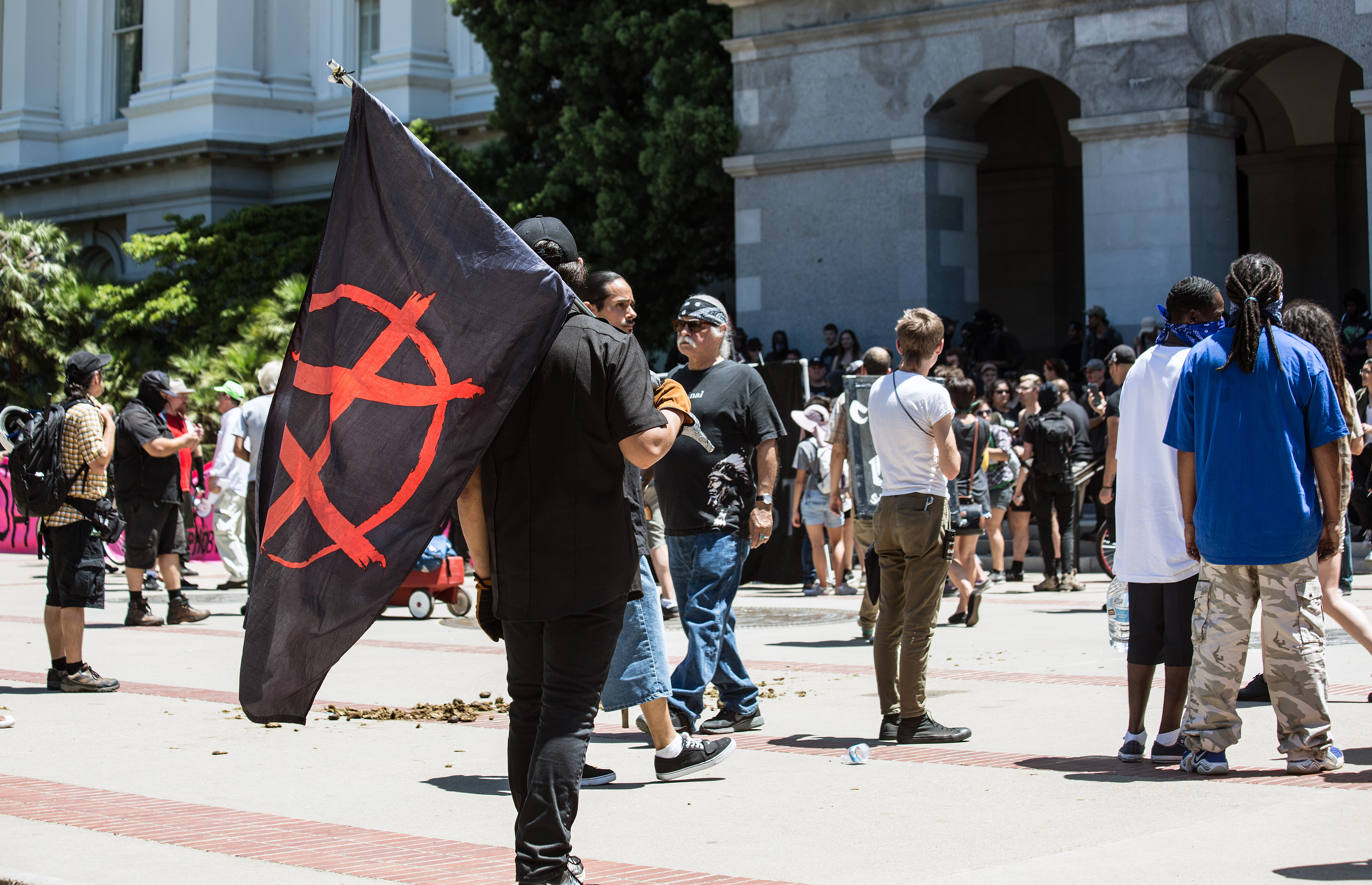
Anarchist bearing a black flag with a red circle A after the 2016 Sacramento riot, a riot and clash between anarchists and neo-Nazis

In the 19th century, the development of capitalism saw the formation of several opposing political ideologies and movements, particularly anarchism. Anarchists advocate for the struggle against all forms of domination, among which is economic domination, with the development of capitalism. They are particularly opposed to the State, viewed as the institution enabling the endorsement of many of these dominations through its police, army, and propaganda. They want to replace the State and capitalism by egalitarian, voluntary, stateless societies.

==== Birth and dissemination of the black flag as a symbol of the labour movement ====
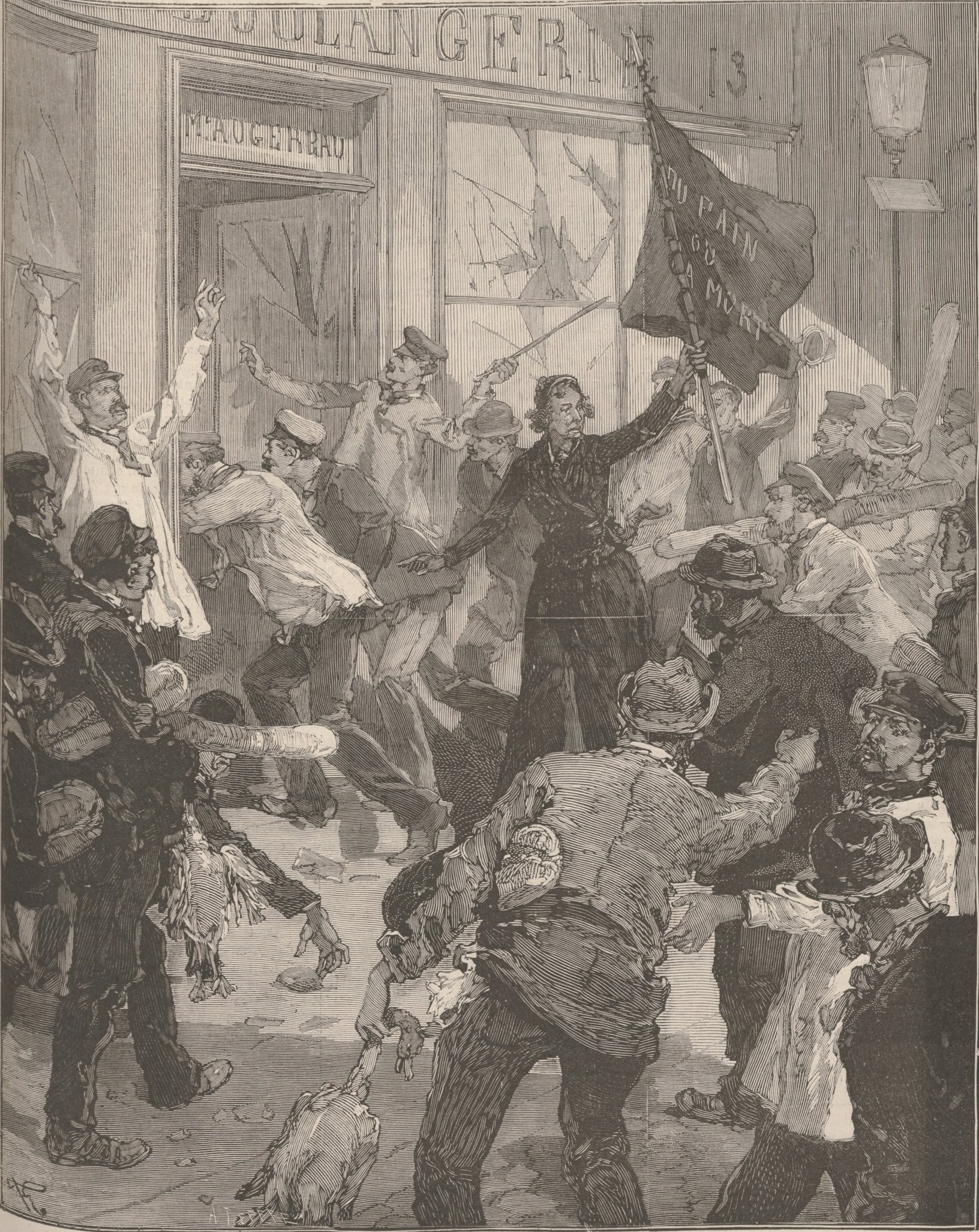
Front page of Le Monde illustré depicting Louise Michel carrying the black flag with the motto 'Bread or Death' and inciting demonstrators to loot a bakery (17 March 1883).

The black flag was used by the Canuts during their revolt in 1831, where it represented liberty, mourning, and hunger for these revolted workers. However, these workers were not anarchists in the strict sense, as the anarchist movement had not yet been constituted. This revolt ended in the brutal massacre of the revolting Canuts by Adolphe Thiers and left a strong mark on generations of workers, particularly in Lyon and the Rhône region, where the memory of the Canuts Revolt remained vivid after its suppression.

In the decades that followed, the black flag was used repeatedly in the workers' movement of the Lyon region, serving as a counterpoint to the red flag. It was reused during the Lyon Commune—a revolt also repressed by Adolphe Thiers—by the insurgents, a number of whom subsequently joined anarchism.

=== The anarchist black flag ===
==== Black Band and Louise Michel ====
In the context of the Lyon circles, the question of the black flag arose in 1881, when some of them debated whether or not to use it. The anarchist Claude Bernard, half brother of Fanny Madignier, then advocated for its use as a symbol of mourning and memory of the Canuts Revolt and the Lyon Commune, a choice that was adopted.

Black flag of the Kronstadt revolt (1921)

The following year, during the Montceau-les-Mines troubles by the Black Band, about a hundred kilometers north of Lyon, this organisation of anarchist miners repeatedly claimed the use of the black flag as an anarchist symbol in the Lyon newspaper, L'Étendard révolutionnaire. In their first declaration on the subject, they wrote :

'The 'Black Band' is the 'Band of Misery', the black flag we have raised is the flag of hunger, of strike, of all-out struggle on the ground of the social revolution, of the annihilation of capital, of employers, of the exploitation of man by man'.

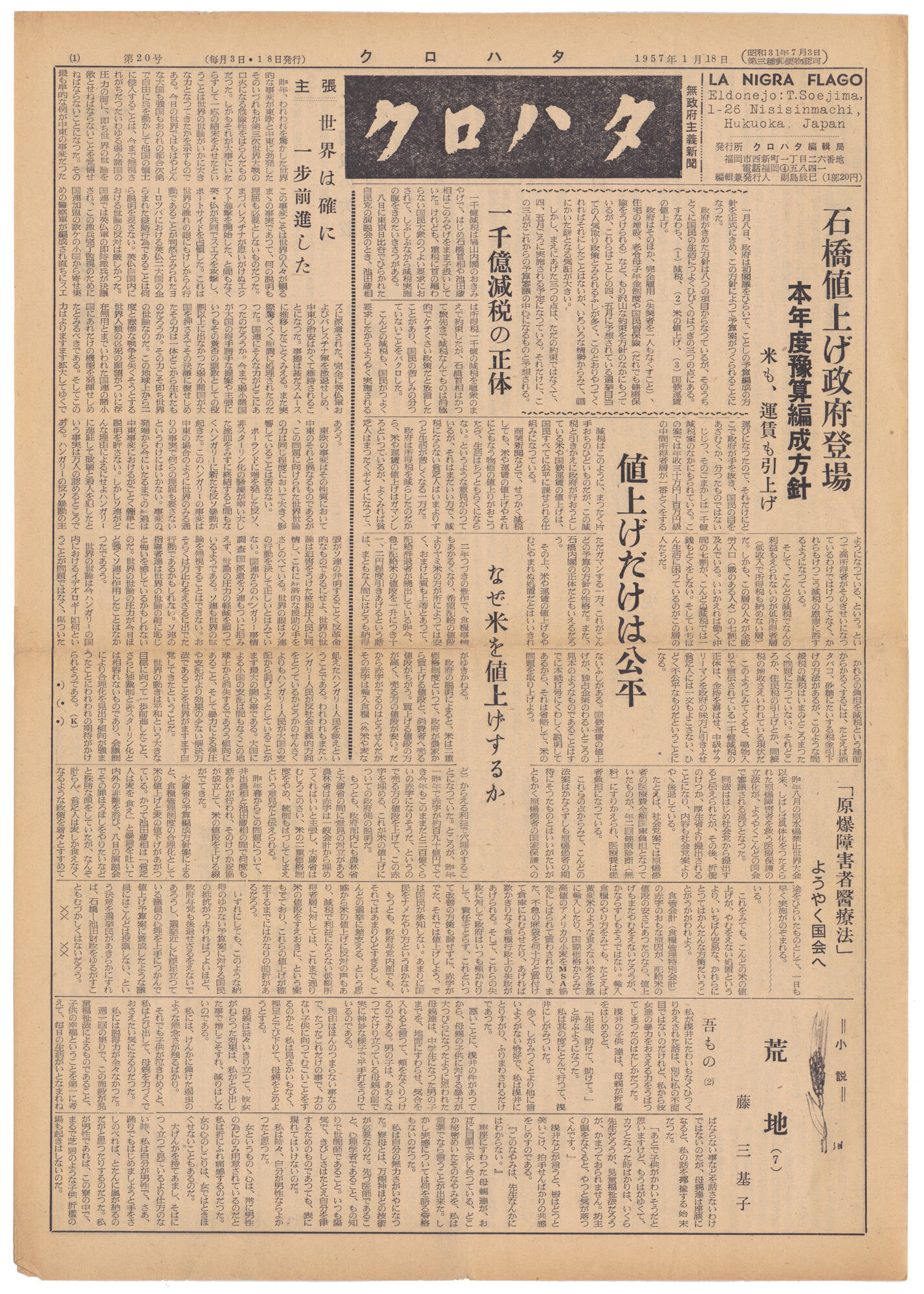
Cover of the first issue of クロハタ (The Black Flag), an anarchist newspaper published in Fokuoka, Japan, in 1957

While the Black Band was carrying out its attacks and publishing its manifestos in Lyon, a series of anarchist bombings began in the city, and the French authorities responded with a significant repression of the anarchist movement in France, culminating in the Trial of the 66 in January 1883 and the death sentence of Antoine Cyvoct for having written a newspaper article. Louise Michel, a notable figure in anarchist circles, who attended the Trial of the 66 and was profoundly outraged by it, then organised the demonstration of 9 March 1883 in Paris. During this event, her group looted Parisian bakeries to protest against hunger—and she flew a black flag.

It is truly from this demonstration and her actions that it became a central symbol of anarchism and, more broadly, of the workers' movement. This view is shared by the historian Félix Chartreux, who considers that it is truly from this event that it 'entered history'. Michel, who made the front page of several French newspapers with her flag, gave the following meaning to her use of the black flag during her trial, before being sentenced to six years of prison:

Ah certainly, Mr. Attorney General, you find it strange that a woman dares to defend the black flag. Why did we shelter the demonstration under the black flag? Because this flag is the flag of strikes and it indicates that the worker has no bread. [...] The people are dying of hunger, and they do not even have the right to say that they are dying of hunger. Well, I took the black flag and went to say that the people were without work and without bread. That is my crime; judge it as you will.

== Legacy ==
=== Central symbol of the anarchist movement ===
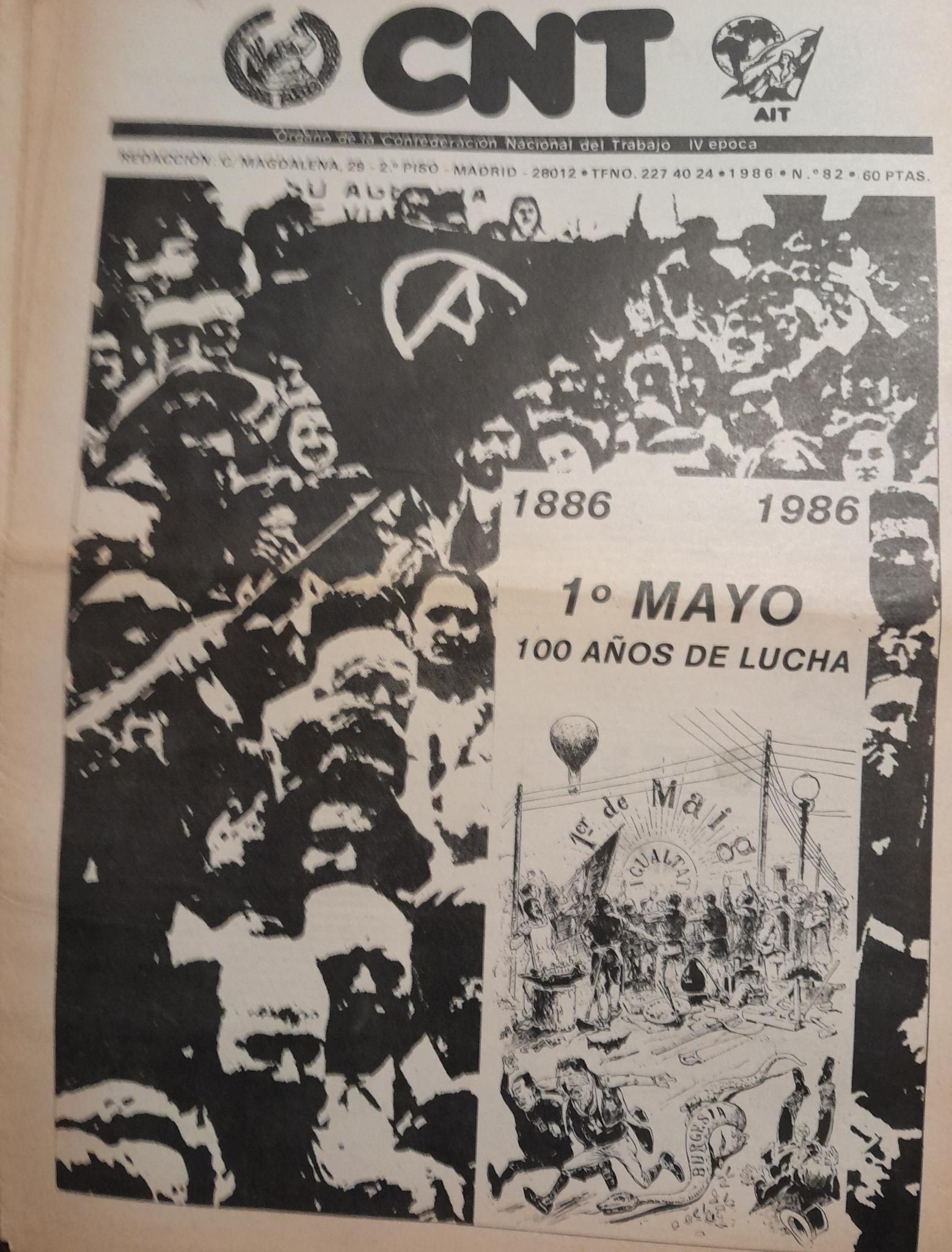
Cover from an issue of the Spanish CNT newspaper found at the historian Rolf Dupuy's—here, the newspaper commemorates the centenary of the Haymarket Square massacre.

In August 1883, shortly after her trial, the Lyon newspaper, Le Drapeau noir (The Black Flag), one of the successor titles to L'Étendard révolutionnaire, officially took the title, positioning itself in the lineage of the Canuts as well. The symbol quickly spread among anarchists because it suited them very well for several reasons—this was a period when they were trying to distinguish themselves from the more general socialist movement, one of whose main symbols was the red flag—the use of the black flag allowed them to acquire a strong and distinctive visual identity.

In 1884, the black flag was flown in Chicago during a demonstration. It was then frequently adopted by many anarchist groups and organisations, becoming a 'traditional' symbol of the movement; this may be due to the fact that it aligns well with the meaning anarchists wish to give it: it is thus a negation of national flags, a symbol of joy and anger. As such, the researcher and anarchist Howard J. Ehrlich wrote, for example, in 1996 that:

The black flag is the negation of all flags. It is a negation of nationhood... Black is a mood of anger and outrage at all the hideous crimes against humanity perpetrated in the name of allegiance to one state or another... But black is also beautiful. It is a colour of determination, of resolve, of strength, a colour by which all others are clarified and defined... So black is negation, is anger, is outrage, is mourning, is beauty, is hope, is the fostering and sheltering of new forms of human life and relationship on and with this earth.

== Bibliography ==
- Baker, Zoe (2023), Means and Ends: The Revolutionary Practice of Anarchism in Europe and the United States, Edinburgh: AK Press, ISBN 978-1-84935-498-1
- Baylac, Marie-Hélène (2024), Louise Michel, Paris: Perrin, ISBN 978-2262097714
- Bébin, Lionel (1996), Les tentatives de reconstituer la Première Internationale et les débuts du mouvement anarchiste à Lyon (mémoire) [The Attempts to Reconstruct the First International and the Beginnings of the Anarchist Movement in Lyon, 1871–1881 (memoir)], Lyon: University Lyon II
- Berthier, René (2015), La fin de la première Internationale [The end of the First Internationale] (in French), Paris: Le Monde Libertaire, ISBN 978-2915514636
- Jourdain, Edouard (2013). L'anarchisme [Anarchism]. Paris: La Découverte. ISBN 978-2-7071-9091-8.
- Ward, Colin (2004). Anarchism: A Very Short Introduction. Oxford University Press (OUP).
