= L'Émeute (newspaper) =

1883–1884 French anarchist newspaper

- Liberté, égalité, justice
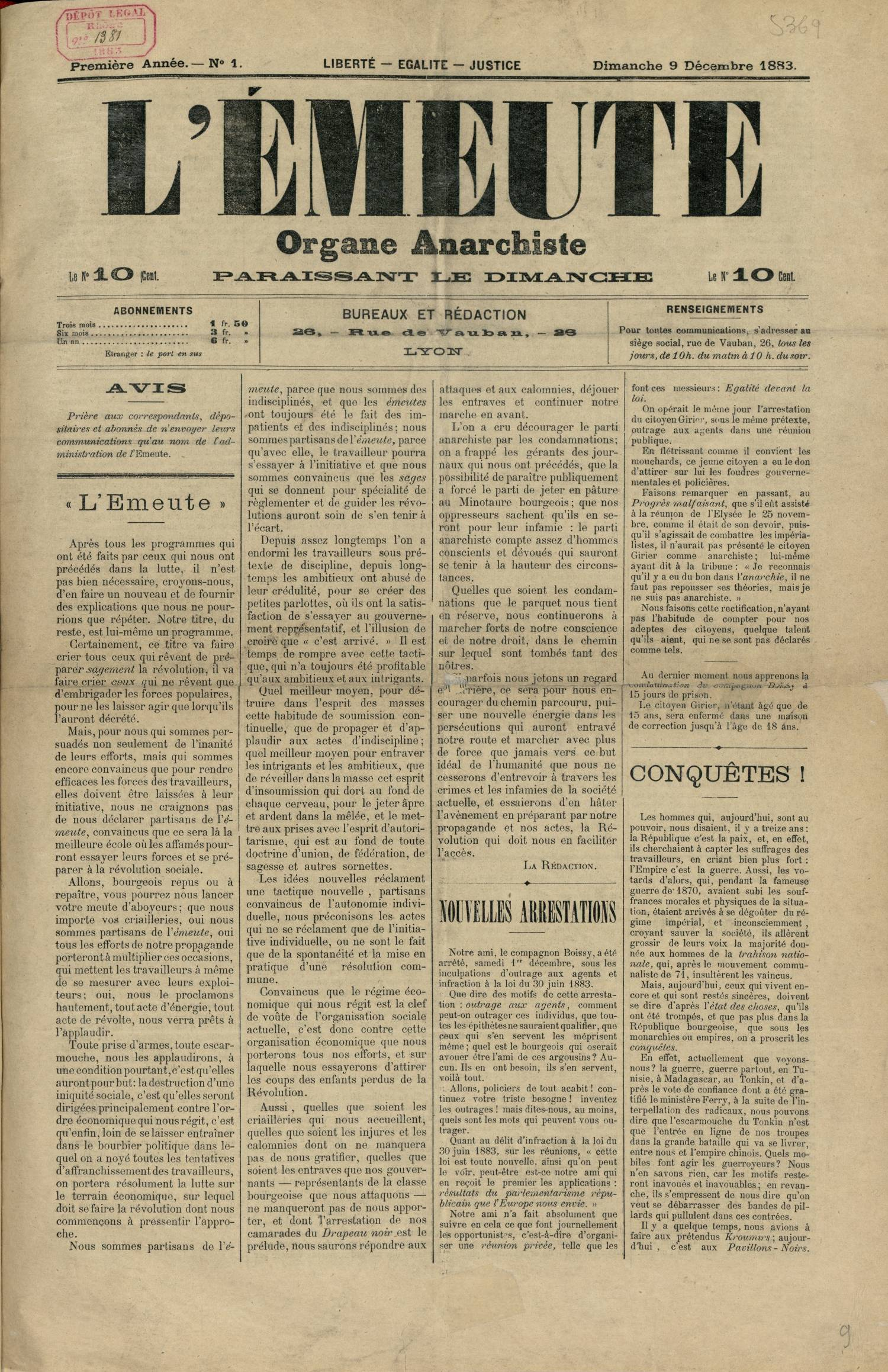
- Cover of the first issue of the newspaper
- Founder(s): Vincent Berthout; Léon Domergue; Claude Grillot
- Founded: 9 December 1883
- Ceased publication: 20 January 1884
- Political alignment: Anarchism; Anarcho-communism
- Language: French
- Headquarters: 52 rue Ferrandière, Lyon

L'Émeute (English: The Riot) was an anarchist newspaper published in Lyon between December 1883 and January 1884. It succeeded Le Drapeau noir, which had been banned a week earlier, and preceded Le Défi.

During a period when Lyon was a major hub for the anarchist movement, they began establishing press outlets that followed one after another in response to frequent bans and significant repression. Following the prohibition of their previous organ, Le Drapeau noir, they founded a new journal titled L'Émeute; it managed to remain in print for about a month before being banned in its turn.

It belongs to the first period of the Lyon anarchist press, featuring a series of closely related newspapers that succeeded one another in the face of government bans, including Le Droit social, L'Étendard révolutionnaire, La Lutte, Le Drapeau noir, L'Émeute, Le Défi, L'Hydre anarchiste, L'Alarme, and Le Droit anarchique.

== History ==
=== Situation of anarchism in Lyon and first publications ===
Lyon and the Lyon region in general quickly became an important hub for anarchism—anarchists there formed a Lyonnese Federation. Lyonnese anarchists operated in a climate of repression and surveillance from the French authorities. However, in 1878, they decided to acquire a newspaper and founded a society, Le Droit social, intended to raise funds for the creation of an eponymous newspaper. Unfortunately for them, the law then required a deposit (cautionnement)—that is, a deposit of funds with the authorities—to be allowed to publish, which made such an initiative difficult for financial and practical reasons, as anarchist newspapers tended to be rapidly banned in France.

In 1882, following the new press freedom law of 1881, the situation changed with the suppression of this deposit requirement, and Le Droit social was founded in Lyon in February 1882. It was heavily monitored by the French authorities; every issue was sparingly analyzed, the special commissaire of Lyon sought to discover the precise authors of each article, and authorities initiated numerous prosecutions against the successive managers of the newspaper, which changed its name several times. It ceased publication on 23 July 1882 and was succeeded by L'Étendard révolutionnaire between August and October 1882.

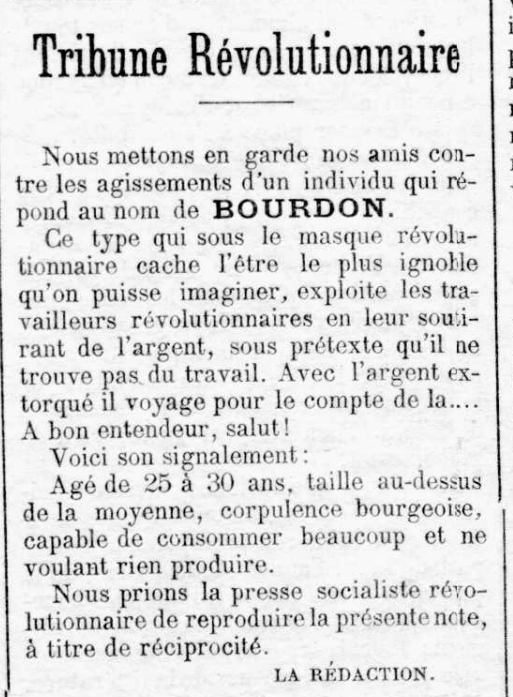
The editorial board of L'Émeute warning companions to beware of a certain Bourdon, accused of stealing funds and living off the movement's resources (N°5)

This newspaper was subsequently banned following the Assommoir bombing, and its manager, Antoine Cyvoct, was sentenced to death due to one of the journal's articles. The anarchist movement in France, and specifically in Lyon, was then severely targeted by repression, which culminated in January 1883 during the Trial of the 66. In Lyon itself, several anarchists established a new press organ titled La Lutte ('The Struggle'). Like its predecessors, it was quickly prosecuted and banned. Shortly thereafter, the newspaper Le Drapeau noir ('The Black Flag'), which followed La Lutte, was founded in August 1883 and ran until December 1883. It suffered the same fate as its predecessors.

=== L'Émeute ===
With the ban on the previous title issued on 2 December 1883, Lyon's anarchists established a new title, L'Émeute ('The Riot'), on 9 December. In its first issue, the paper explained the reasons behind the choice of this name, stating:

We are partisans of the riot, because we are undisciplined, and riots have always been the work of the impatient and the undisciplined; we are partisans of the riot because, through it, the worker can test their own initiative, and we are convinced that the 'wise' who specialize in regulating and guiding revolutions will take care to stay away.

In its fourth issue, the journal explicitly referenced previous titles and announced that its goal was the anarchist social revolution.

The printing house was located at 52 rue Ferrandière in Lyon. Historian René Bianco has identified several authors, even though the articles were unsigned; they are believed to be Vincent Berthout, Léon Domergue, and Claude Grillot.

The newspaper spanned seven issues, from 9 December 1883, to 20 January 1884, before being banned in its turn and giving way to the next press organ, Le Défi.

== Works ==
- Full collection on the Archives Autonomies website

== Bibliography ==
- Chambost, Anne-Sophie (2017), "" Nous ferons de notre pire… ". Anarchie, illégalisme … et lois scélérates" [«We’ll Do our Worse». Anarchy, Illegalism … and Evil Law], Droit et Cultures, 74 (2): 65–87, doi:10.4000/droitcultures.4264
