= L'Hydre anarchiste =

1884 French anarchist newspaper

- Liberté, égalité, justice
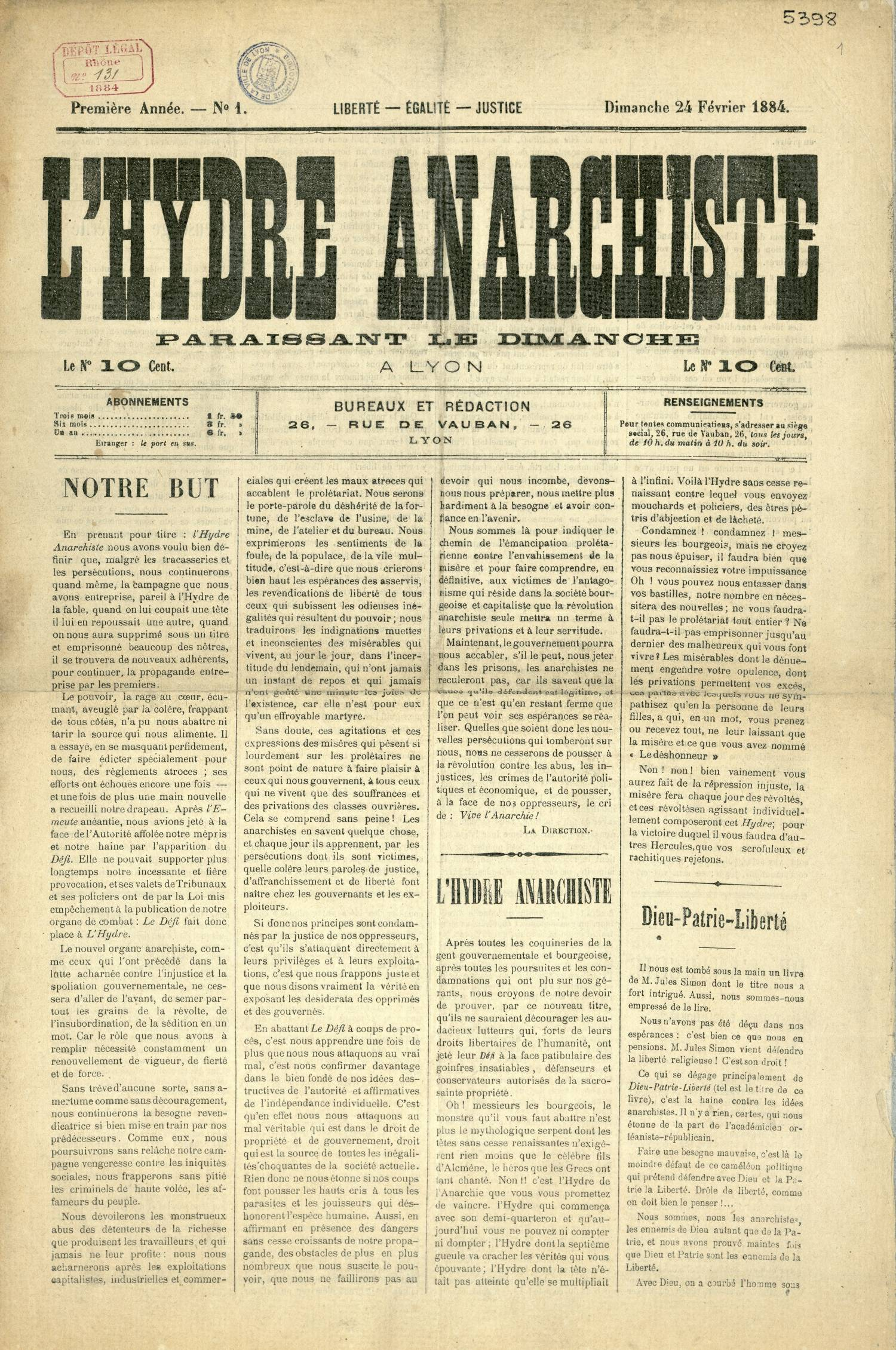
- Cover of the first issue of the newspaper
- Founder(s): Antoine Cyvoct; Georges Garraud (Valadier); G. Robert (Manager); Vincent Berthout
- Founded: 24 February 1884
- Ceased publication: 30 March 1884
- Political alignment: Anarchism; Propaganda by the deed
- Language: French
- Headquarters: Lyon

L'Hydre anarchiste (English: The Anarchist Hydra) was an anarchist newspaper published in Lyon between February and March 1884. It succeeded Le Défi, which was banned before publication began, and preceded L'Alarme.

During this period, Lyon was a major hub for the anarchist movement. They began establishing various press outlets that followed one after another in response to frequent bans and heavy state repression. Despite only being published for two months, the newspaper focused heavily on the trial of Antoine Cyvoct regarding the Assommoir bombing and advocated for propaganda by the deed. It also serves as a significant early example of a female anarchist readership in France, featuring sections of the paper addressed directly to women companions.

It belongs to the first period of the Lyon anarchist press, featuring a series of closely related newspapers that succeeded one another in the face of government bans, including Le Droit social, L'Étendard révolutionnaire, La Lutte, Le Drapeau noir, L'Émeute, Le Défi, L'Hydre anarchiste, L'Alarme, and Le Droit anarchique.

== History ==
=== Situation of anarchism in Lyon and first publications ===
Lyon and the Lyon region in general quickly became an important hub for anarchism—anarchists there formed a Lyonnese Federation. Lyonnese anarchists operated in a climate of repression and surveillance from the French authorities. However, in 1878, they decided to acquire a newspaper and founded a society, Le Droit social, intended to raise funds for the creation of an eponymous newspaper. Unfortunately for them, the law then required a deposit (cautionnement)—that is, a deposit of funds with the authorities—to be allowed to publish, which made such an initiative difficult for financial and practical reasons, as anarchist newspapers tended to be rapidly banned in France.

In 1882, following the new press freedom law of 1881, the situation changed with the suppression of this deposit requirement, and Le Droit social was founded in Lyon in February 1882. It was heavily monitored by the French authorities; every issue was sparingly analyzed, the special commissaire of Lyon sought to discover the precise authors of each article, and authorities initiated numerous prosecutions against the successive managers of the newspaper, which changed its name several times. It ceased publication on 23 July 1882 and was succeeded by L'Étendard révolutionnaire between August and October 1882.

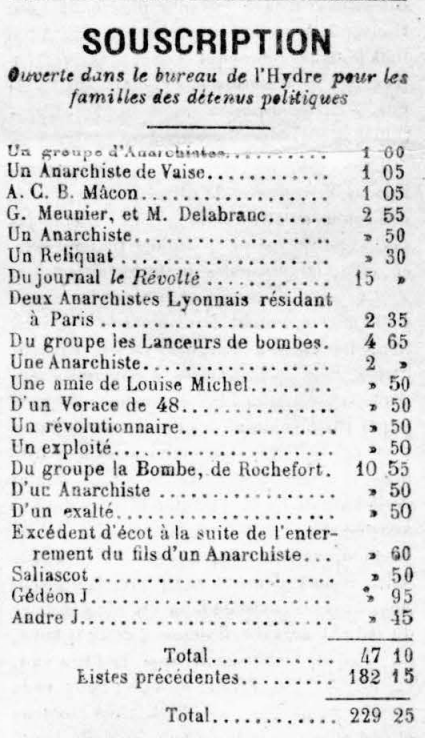
Subscribers to the newspaper's crowdfunding for a project, including at least two women, in the third issue

This newspaper was subsequently banned following the Assommoir bombing, and its manager, Antoine Cyvoct, was sentenced to death due to one of the journal's articles. The anarchist movement in France, and specifically in Lyon, was then severely targeted by repression, which culminated in January 1883 during the Trial of the 66. In Lyon itself, several anarchists established a new press organ titled La Lutte ('The Struggle'). Like its predecessors, it was quickly prosecuted and banned. Shortly thereafter, the newspaper Le Drapeau noir ('The Black Flag'), which followed La Lutte, was founded in August 1883 and ran until December 1883. It suffered the same fate as its predecessors and was succeeded by L’Émeute ('The Riot') from December 1883 to January 1884. Following L’Émeute, it was the turn of Le Défi ('The Defiance') to be published by the Lyonnese anarchists, lasting for only three issues in February 1884.

=== L'Hydre anarchiste ===
Following the final issue of Le Défi, which was banned on 17 February, the Lyonnese anarchists established a new newspaper named L'Hydre anarchiste. Among its contributors were Antoine Cyvoct and Georges Garraud, known as 'Valadier'.

The second issue of the journal, dated 2 March, was almost entirely dedicated to defending Cyvoct during his trial. The fourth issue, published on 16 March, commemorated the Paris Commune and was printed on purple paper.

While René Bianco did not identify the manager in his study of the newspaper, an individual named G. Robert was later identified by Pierre Sommermeyer in the Dictionnaire international des militants anarchistes (DIMA). It is also possible that the companion Vincent Berthout was part of the editorial team. The historian Marie-Pier Tardif used this newspaper as an example to illustrate the emergence of a female anarchist readership in France during this period, evidenced by several articles specifically addressed to them.

L'Hydre anarchiste advocated for propaganda by the deed and was one of the many anarchist publications of that era to support this strategy. The newspaper was interrupted on 30 March 1884, after its sixth issue, making way for its successor, L'Alarme ('The Alarm').

== Legacy ==
=== Memorial survivances ===
An associative venue in Crest took the name L'Hydre in reference to this newspaper.

== Works ==
- Full collection on the Archives Autonomies website

== Bibliography ==
- Chambost, Anne-Sophie (2017), "" Nous ferons de notre pire… ". Anarchie, illégalisme … et lois scélérates" [«We’ll Do our Worse». Anarchy, Illegalism … and Evil Law], Droit et Cultures, 74 (2): 65–87, doi:10.4000/droitcultures.4264
- Tardif, Marie-Pier (2021), Ni ménagères, ni courtisanes. Les femmes de lettres dans la presse anarchiste française (1885-1905) (PhD thesis) [Neither housewives nor courtesans. Women writers in the French anarchist press (1885-1905)] (PDF)
