= Demonstration of 9 March 1883 =

Anarchist protest in France

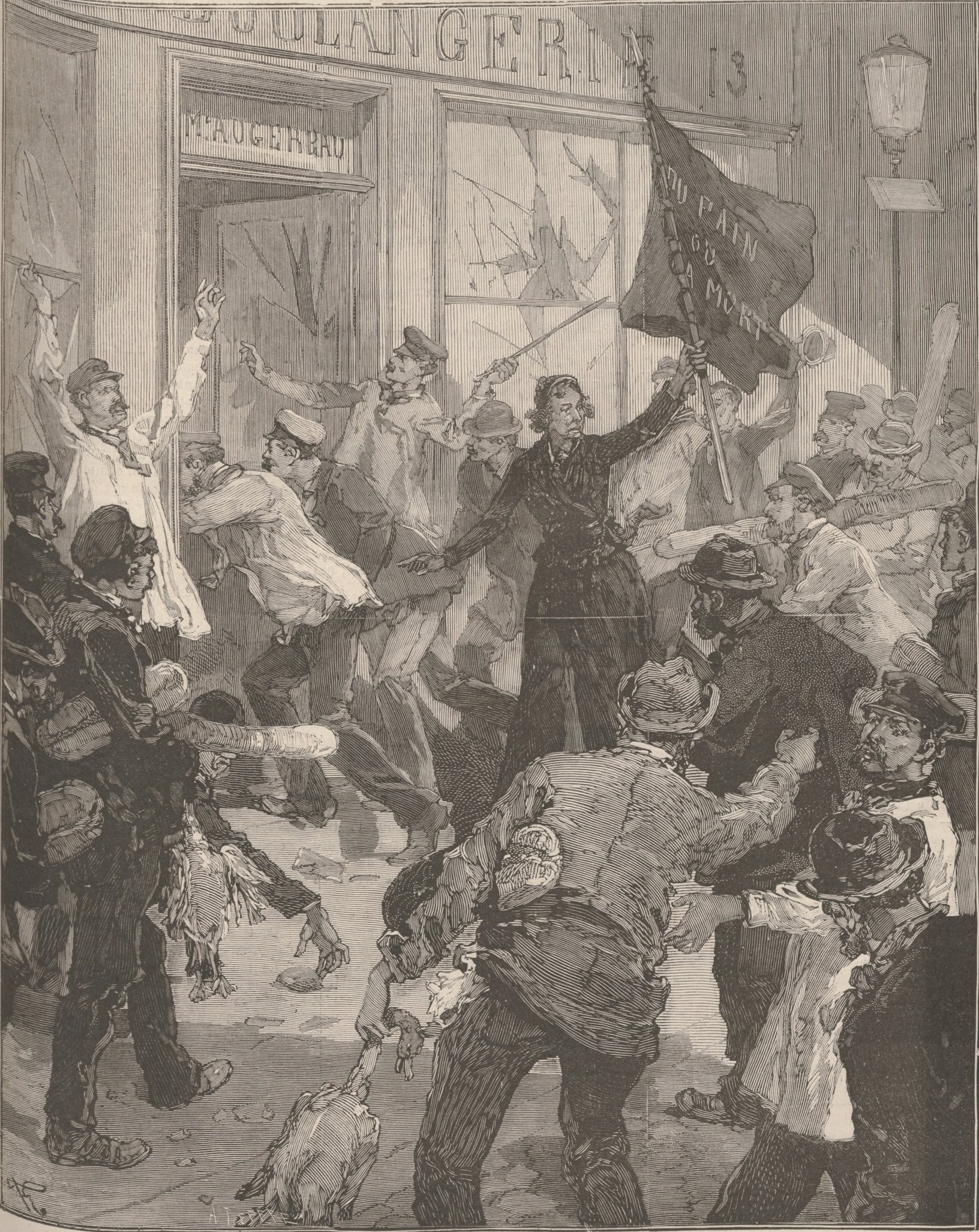
- Front page of Le Monde illustré depicting Louise Michel carrying the black flag with the motto 'Bread or Death' and inciting demonstrators to loot a bakery (17 March 1883).
- Date: 9 March 1883
- Location: Paris

Parties
(France) France; French police French army	Anarchists; Black International (?); Unemployed people Carpenters; Workers

Lead figures
Jules Grévy	Louise Michel; Émile Pouget; Paule Mink; Émile Digeon

Number
Thousands (?)	Around 15.000

Casualties and losses
Unknown, probably several	Unknown, probably several

The demonstration of 9 March 1883 was an anarchist protest in Paris led by approximately 15,000 unemployed people, carpenters, and workers. Louise Michel, Émile Pouget and Émile Digeon, three notable figures of the anarchist movement, took part. Paule Mink also took part in it, charging the police with a revolver. In addition to causing serious disturbances in the French capital, and narrowly missing the Élysée Palace or the French Interior Ministry, the demonstration is known for Michel's action, where she displayed the black flag, making it a central symbol of the anarchist movement.

Following the founding and development of anarchism, which a number of former Communards like Michel joined, this ideology and movement influenced and was joined by a number of workers and artisans, such as carpenters. As the repression against the movement intensified, the Chambre syndicale des menuisiers du bâtiment ('Carpenters' Union of the Building Industry') called for a large demonstration at Les Invalides against poverty and hunger.

The French authorities were alarmed by the situation and deployed a significant police presence around Les Invalides, which managed to push back the demonstrators and prevent them from entering the square. Two crowd movements then occurred: one headed towards the Élysée Palace and was repelled only at the last moment, when the Prefect of Police commandeered omnibuses and drove them towards the crowd.

On the other side, Michel, who put a black cloth on a broom, thus creating a black flag, and Pouget led a group of a few hundred people who went deep into the Latin Quarter, looting bakeries and shops. Pouget was arrested while fighting to free Michel, who managed to escape and go into hiding. She surrendered to the police a few weeks later, possibly because her mother was ill and she was worried about her. Michel, Pouget, and other anarchists were tried in June 1883; she received six years in prison, and Pouget, eight.

== History ==
=== Context ===
Demonstration of 9 March 1883 (Paris)
Location of the main hotspots during the demonstration - the points without label are the bakeries ransacked by Michel's group

In the 19th century, anarchism emerged and took shape in Europe before spreading. Anarchists advocate a struggle against all forms of domination perceived as unjust including economic domination brought forth by capitalism. They are particularly opposed to the State, seen as the organization that legitimizes a good number of these dominations through its police, army and propaganda.

Following the Paris Commune, many former Communards joined this movement—which mostly formed from the 1870s onwards and was established, starting in 1872 with the Hague Congress and the founding of the Jura Federation, also called the Anti-Authoritarian International, in clear opposition to the Marxists. Among these Communards who became anarchists were Constant Martin, Constant Marie, André Léo, Louise Pioger, Antoine Perrare, Émile Digeon, and especially Louise Michel, who joined the anarchist movement upon her return from deportation to the penal colony of New Caledonia at the end of the 1870s.

Michel began to speak at numerous far-left conferences and gatherings starting in 1880 and quickly became close to the anarchists, whom she joined—being notably convinced of the necessity to abolish the state and lead the Social Revolution.

Alongside Louise Michel's ideological evolution and the fact that her past as a Communard, a deportee, and her activism offered her a certain prestige and a privileged place within the movement, state repression targeting anarchists intensified as their numbers grew in France. Numerous trials began to target them, their press was banned, and articles of law to criminalise the movement were passed. For example, in 1881, the new law on the freedom of the press allowed the Minister of the Interior to prohibit the publication of any press title simply by his choice, without a court decision.

From the beginning of the 1880s, the Black Band, workers' organisations of miners whose name maybe came from the Mano Negra - though it's uncertain, began carrying out attacks in Saône-et-Loire, targeting both Catholic leaders and symbols and the employers or bourgeoisie of the region.

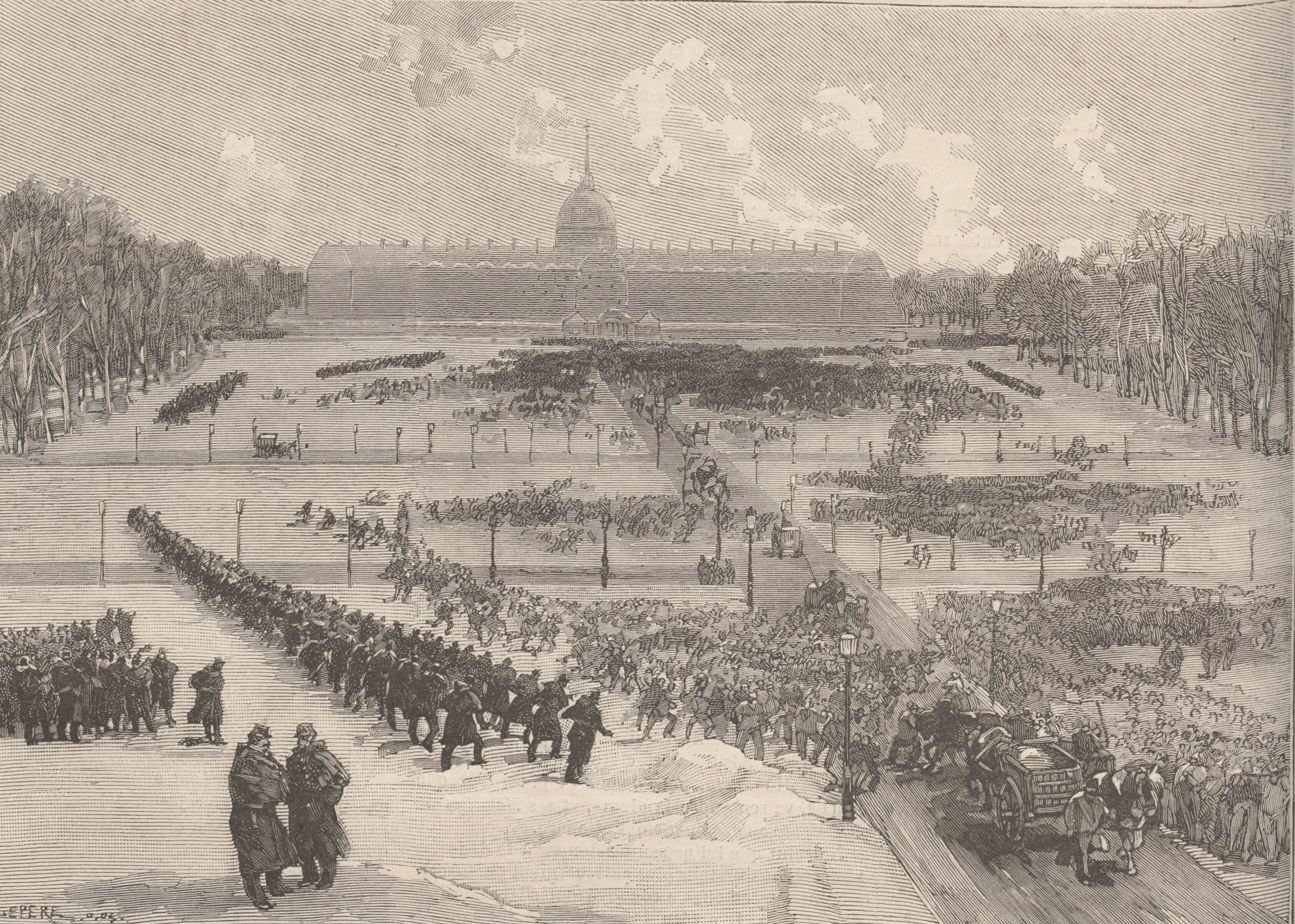
Les Invalides around 2 p.m., Le Monde illustré (17 March 1883)

In 1883, the Trial of the 66 impacted the movement, when dozens of anarchists were arrested and tried in a political trial aimed at them. Peter Kropotkin, a major anarchist theorist, was among the accused and was sentenced to five years of hard prison time. Michel left the courtroom arm-in-arm with Sophie Kropotkin, his wife and, that very evening, called for the people's vengeance for this treatment.

=== Premices ===
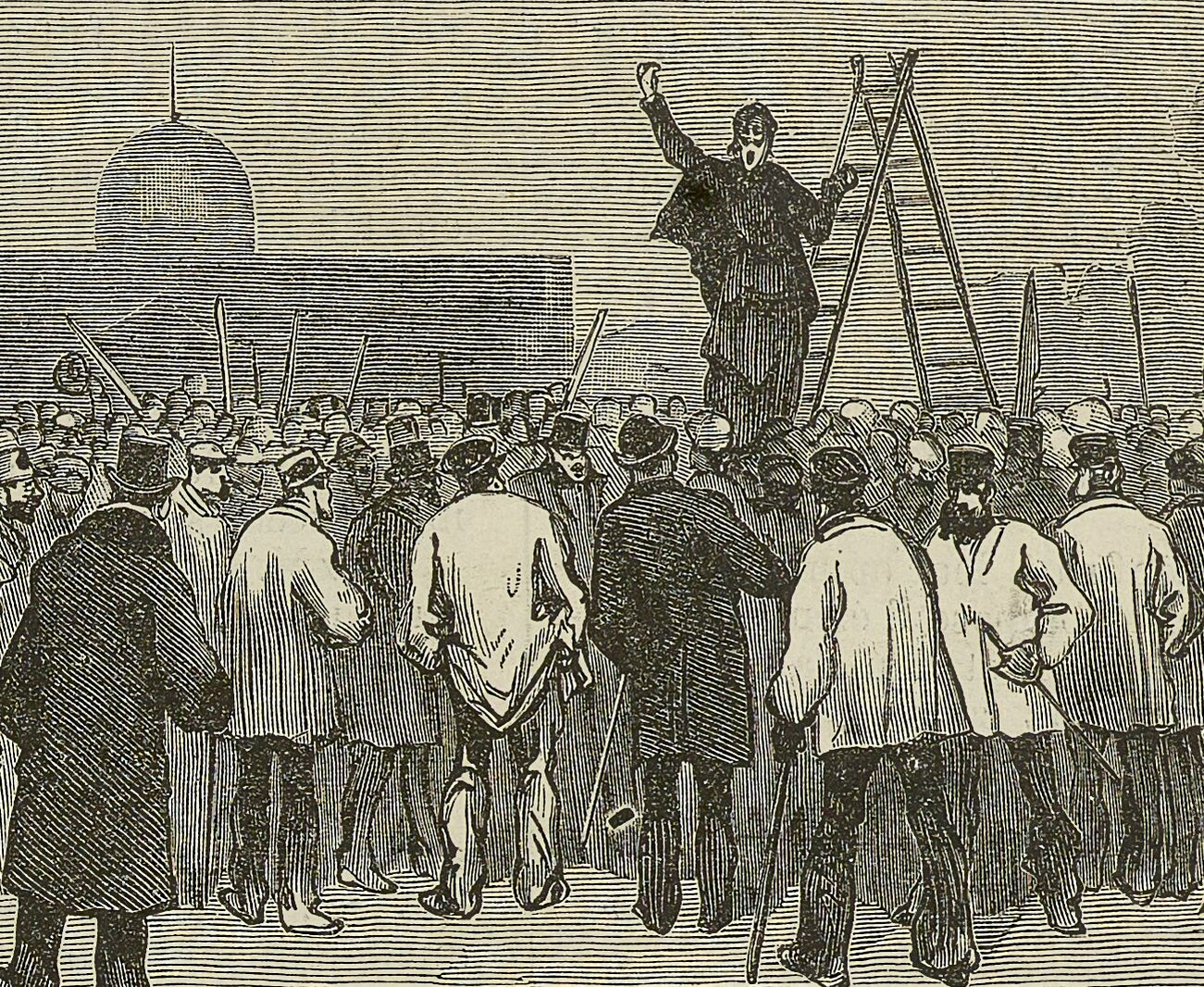
Louise Michel addressing the people near Les Invalides, Le Journal illustré (25 March 1883)

At the end of February 1883, about a hundred members of the building carpenters' union—carpenters often being anarchists or sympathisers, particularly because their profession was being made precarious by the Industrial Revolution and the evolution of capitalism—launched a call to demonstrate against hunger and poverty. Several declared anarchists were signatories to this appeal.

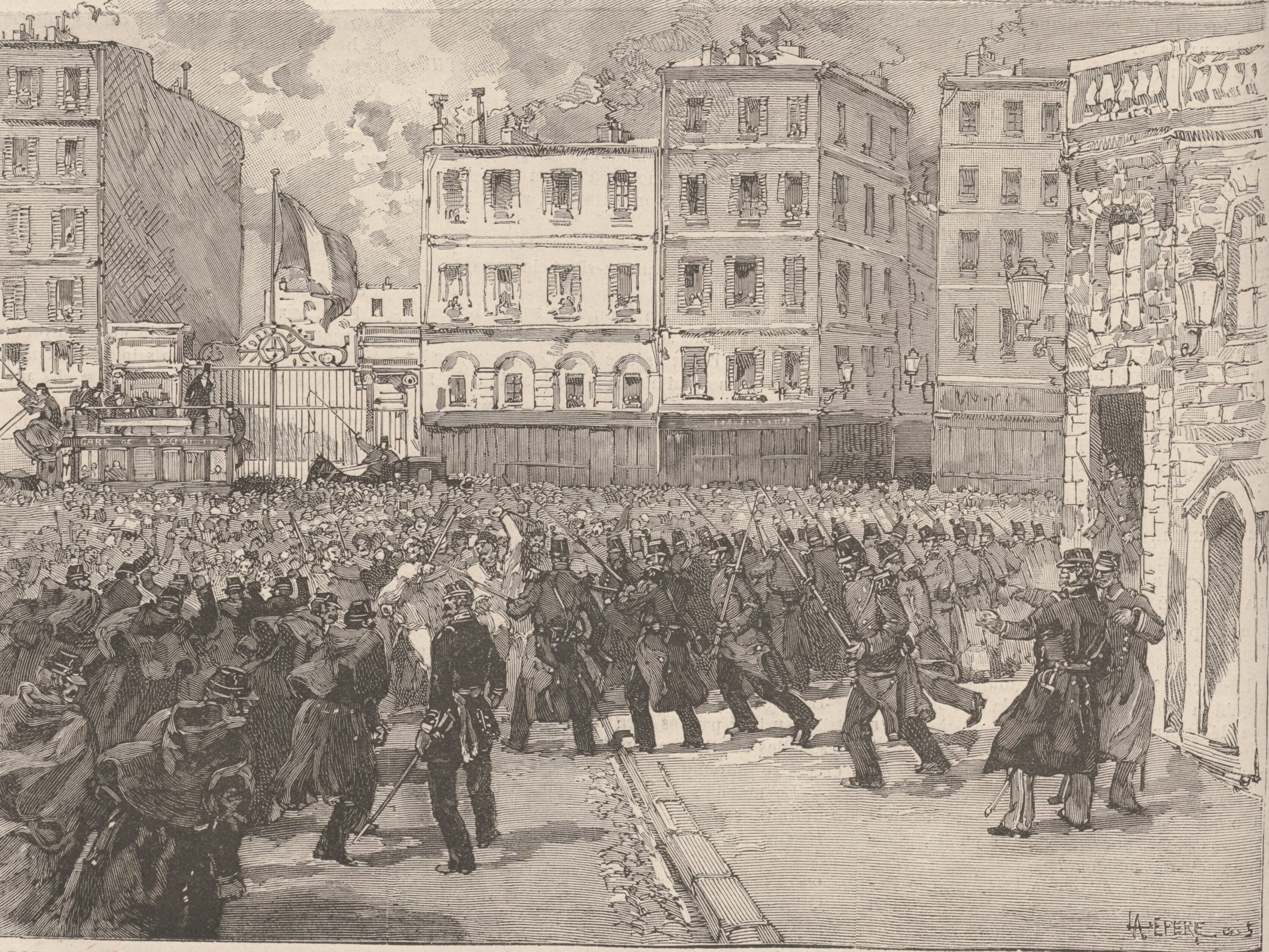
Police trying to push the crowd away from the Élysée Palace, Le Monde illustré (17 March 1883)

The French authorities took the measure of such a call in this context; with the capital city having over 80,000 unemployed workers, the situation seemed alarming enough for numerous police and army troops to be deployed. The barracks near Les Invalides were reinforced, and the cavalry from the École Militaire was made available.

On 6 March 1883, Michel participated in the launch of the newspaper La Vengeance Anarchiste. Two days later, on the eve of the demonstration, she reportedly declared to a conservative journalist that the responsibility for any blood that might be spilled the next day would fall upon the 'Versaillais' (a term referring to the government forces who suppressed the Paris Commune in 1871).

=== Protest ===
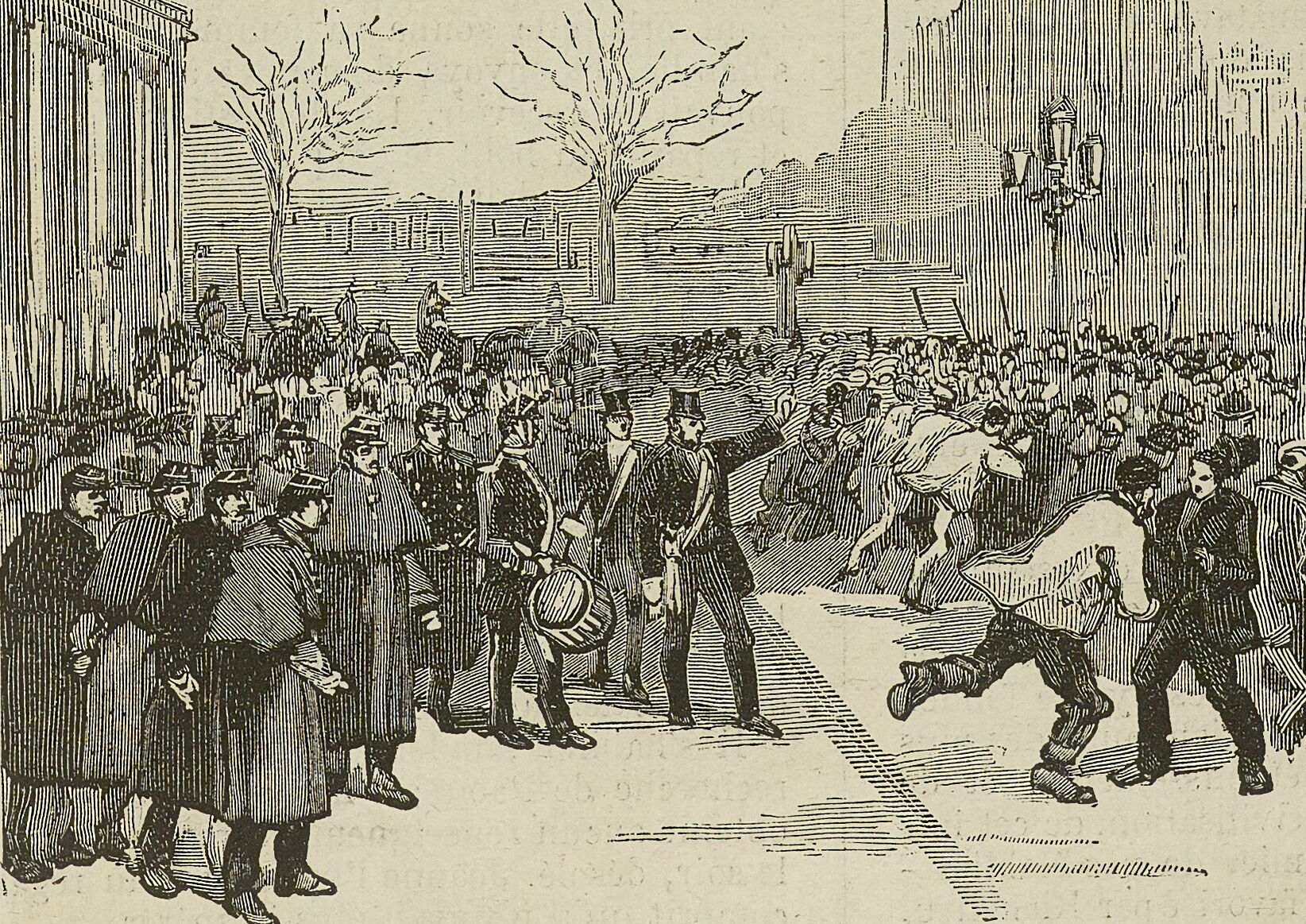
Police shooting on the crowd near l'Hôtel de Ville (Town Hall of Paris)

On 9 March 1883, around midday, numerous groups began to flock towards Les Invalides. The police pushed them back, guarding the main avenues leading to the Esplanade des Invalides. These initial groups, numbering four to six thousand people, reformed further away after being turned back.

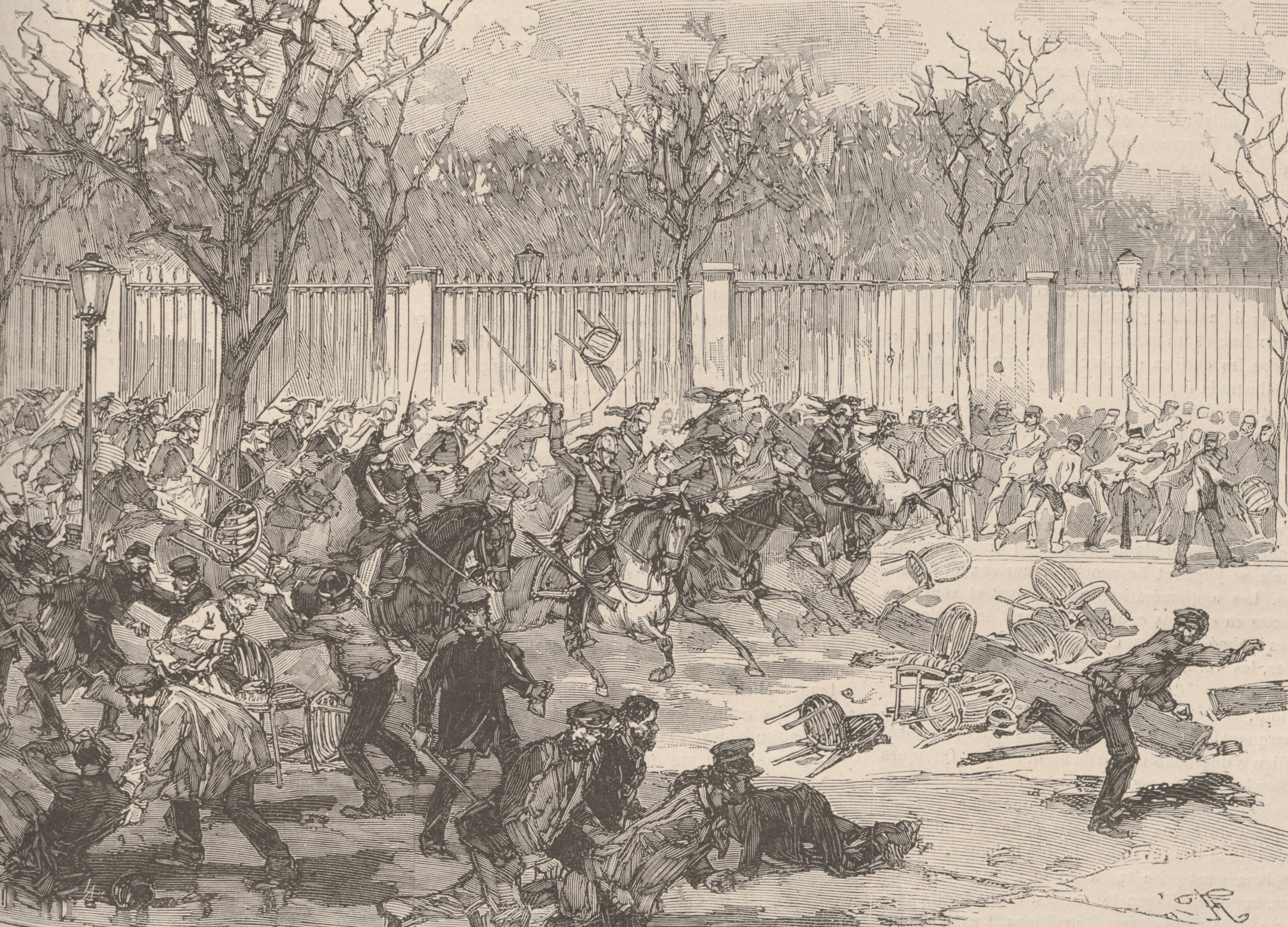
Cavalry charge with sabres on the demonstrators on Rue Gabrielle, Le Monde illustré (17 March 1883)

The number of demonstrators continued to grow in the following hours—around 2 P.M., they numbered approximately 15,000. Michel then arrived via a side alley—dressed in black as was her custom—accompanied by anarchist companions. She then declared that the people should be allowed to gather in the square and that if the police charged them, the crowd would know how to respond to their attacks. Among the people in the demonstration, there were many noted anarchists, including Émile Digeon, a former Communard, leader of the Narbonne Commune, who had become an anarchist since.

Police officers were urgently dispatched to the scene to push her beyond the security cordon where she was trying to enter with about a hundred people. Ironically, according to the historian Marie-Hélène Baylac, this refusal to let the demonstrators gather at Les Invalides provoked two crowd movements—first, a part crossed the Pont des Invalides ('Invalides' Bridge') and began heading towards the Élysée Palace, catching the police off guard. The Prefect had to gather a hundred breathless police officers to protect the Élysée, managed to commandeer three omnibuses, and began driving them in the direction of the demonstrators—numerous blows and arrests then occurred, and the assembled crowd flowed back towards Les Invalides. The President of the Republic, Jules Grévy, reportedly nearly fainted upon learning of the demonstrators' proximity to the Élysée.

Paule Mink—a former Communard close to the anarchist movement—was at the head of a column emerging onto Place Beauvau, the location of the French Ministry of the Interior. She shouted for them to advance while guiding them charging the police with a revolver in her hand. The army was deployed and charged into the crowd with bayonets fixed, repelling the crowd after numerous assaults.

Meanwhile, Michel, who was on the Avenue de La Motte Piquet, took a broom and a black rag which she attached to the handle—thus creating a black flag. She harangued the crowd and led a group of about two hundred people with her friend Émile Pouget onto the Rue de Sèvres before plunging deep into the Latin Quarter. As they passed a bakery in front of the 3rd o Rue des Canettes, a man shouted that they should seize the bread, since they were being refused work—the bakery was then looted, as was the ones at 13 Rue du Four or at 123 Saint-Germain Boulevard the group destroyed window displays and plundered a number of businesses in this affluent district of the capital.

At Place Maubert, the group was caught up by police officers, who surrounded them—in the tumult, aided by two friends, including Pouget, who fought with the police to free her, Michel managed to escape. She got into a cab and went into hiding.

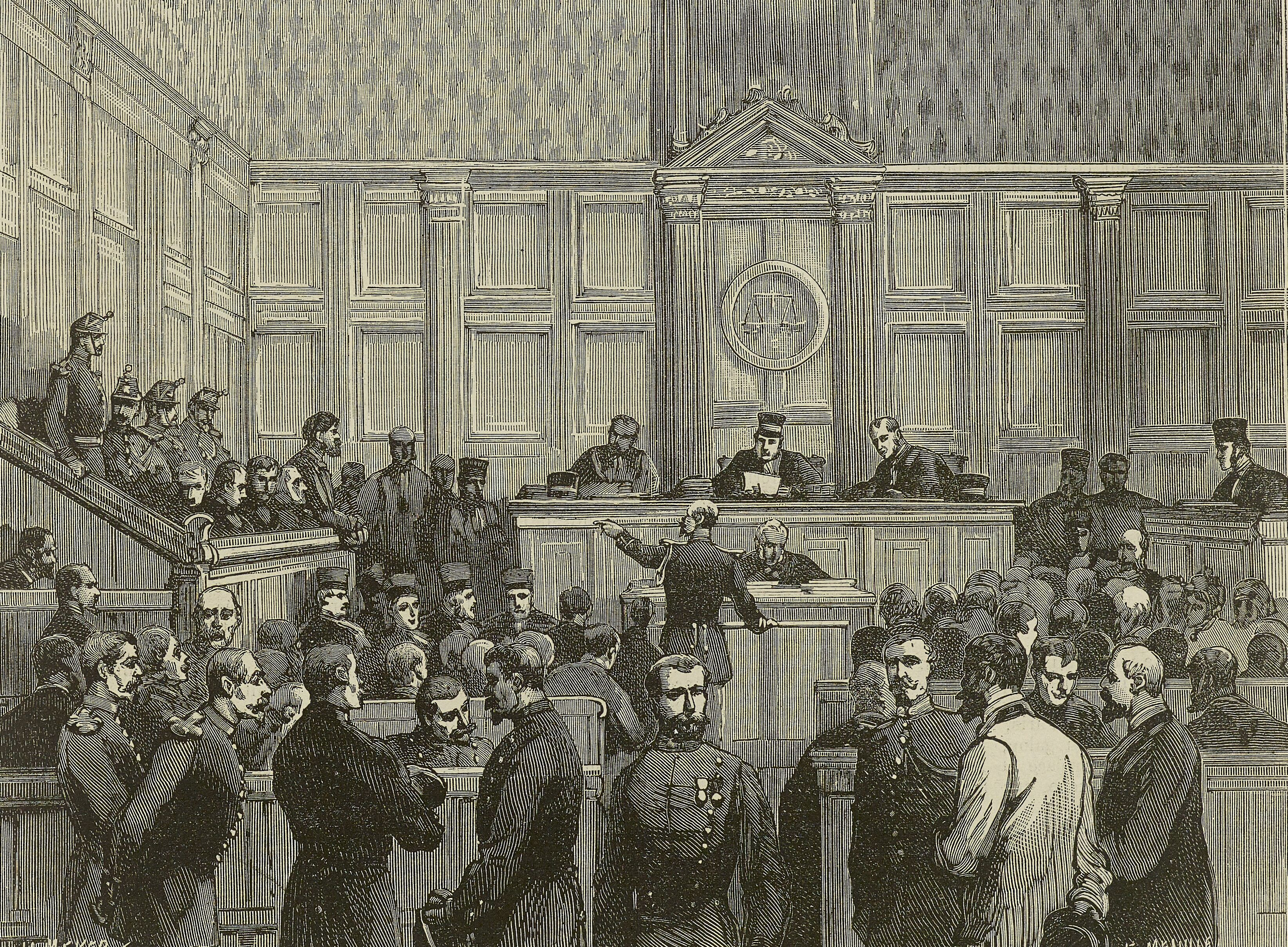
Trial of the first arrests (not Pouget or Michel) in front of the 11th Chamber of the Paris Assize Court, Le Monde illustré (17 March 1883)

In addition to Pouget and Mareuil, those arrested that day also included:

Joseph Aignan (roofer), Joseph Dufour (mason), Paul Chevrenay (optician), Maurice Mottan (unemployed), Alfred-Joseph Chave (furrier - no fixed abode), Noël-Pierre Roussel (employee), Florent Bret (trimming maker), Stanislas Romorantin (chimney sweep), Victor Tournaire (locksmith), Charles Gautier (unemployed), Albert Martin (subscription agent), Henri Renaud (unemployed), Paul Boyer (chimney sweep), and Eugène Brunet (chimney sweep).

=== Immediate aftermath ===
Four days after the demonstration, the Lycée Louis-le-Grand revolted, and the high school students barricaded themselves inside the building at the instigation of their 'anarchist morals', according to the press of the time. The army intervened in the high school to 'restore order', and hundreds of students were expelled.

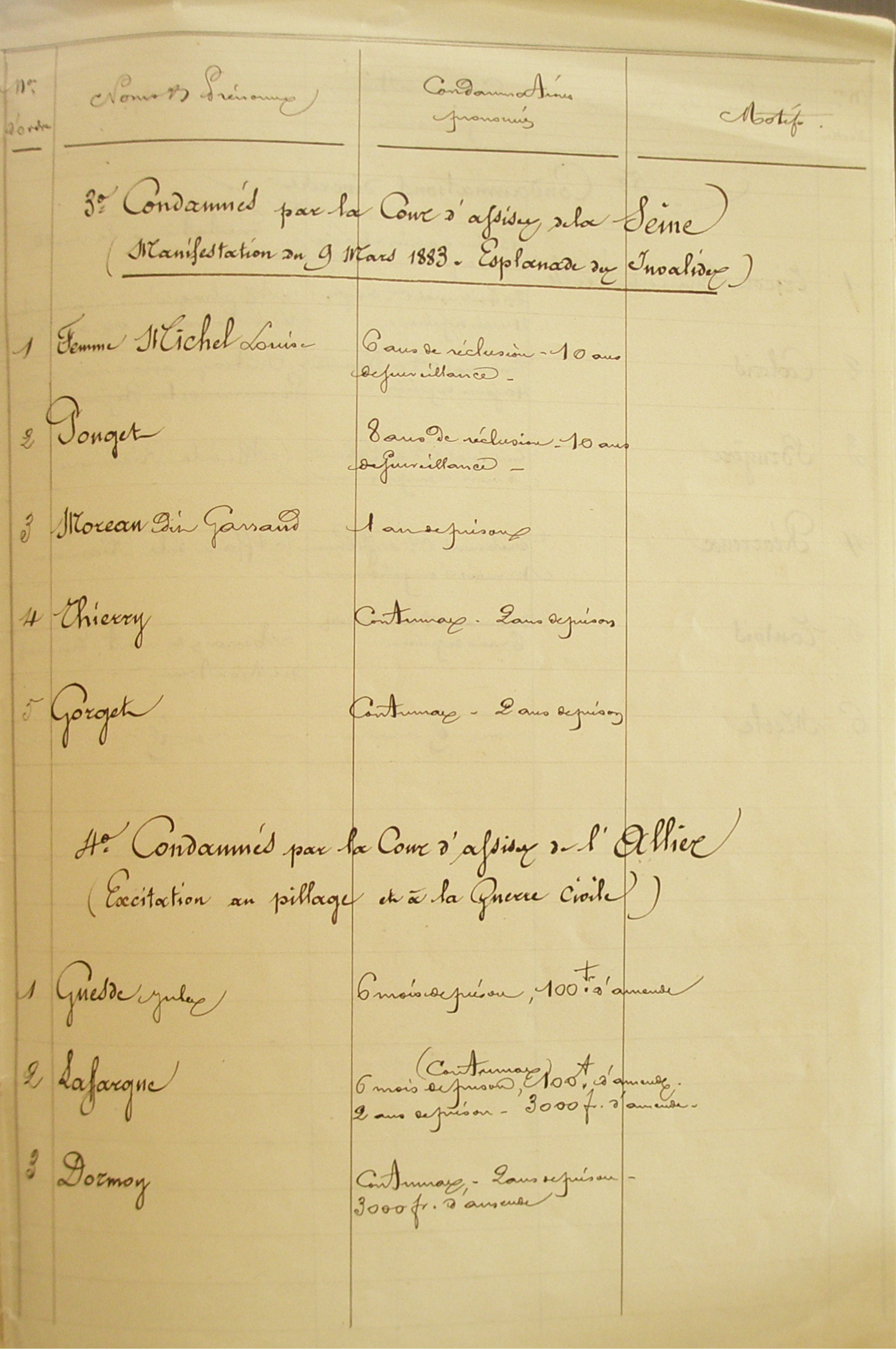
Results of the June 1883 trial (courtesy of Archives Anarchistes)

Michel, who was staying with Ernest Vaughan, a former Communard who had become an anarchist, decided to turn herself in, possibly because she was worried about her mother's health and wished to visit her. When she surrendered, the Prefect arranged to be absent because he found it humiliating that this 'woman' had escaped the police searches and surrendered of her own accord; he would have her arrested the next day according to normal procedure. During the raid at Pouget's home, the police found a six-shot revolver, various containers of explosive materials, and 600 copies of the pamphlet À l'armée ('To the Army'), written by Émile Digeon.

The anarchists were brought to trial between 22 and 24 June 1883, and their group, which also included Mareuil, an anarchist who had participated in their actions in Paris, was combined with another group of anarchists, the authors of the manifesto À l'armée found at Pouget's residence. Michel was sentenced to six years of prison, Pouget to eight, and Mareuil was acquitted.

== Legacy ==
=== The black flag as a symbol for the anarchist movement ===
According to an article in Le Monde published during May 68 and reflecting on the history of this symbol, which was still being used by anarchists of that period: although the black flag was a symbol displayed before Louise Michel, particularly by the Canuts in 1831, it was truly from this demonstration and her actions that it became a central symbol of anarchism and, more broadly, of the labour movement. This view is shared by the historian Félix Chartreux, who considers that it was truly from this event that it 'entered history'. Michel gave the following meaning to her use of the black flag during her trial:

Ah certainly, Mr. Attorney General, you find it strange that a woman dares to defend the black flag. Why did we shelter the demonstration under the black flag? Because this flag is the flag of strikes and it indicates that the worker has no bread. [...] The people are dying of hunger, and they do not even have the right to say that they are dying of hunger. Well, I took the black flag and went to say that the people were without work and without bread. That is my crime; judge it as you will.

The black flag has since been reinterpreted by various anarchists as signifying other meanings in addition to those noted by Michel; the researcher and anarchist Howard J. Ehrlich, for example, wrote in 1996 that:

The black flag is the negation of all flags. It is a negation of nationhood... Black is a mood of anger and outrage at all the hideous crimes against humanity perpetrated in the name of allegiance to one state or another... But black is also beautiful. It is a colour of determination, of resolve, of strength, a colour by which all others are clarified and defined... So black is negation, is anger, is outrage, is mourning, is beauty, is hope, is the fostering and sheltering of new forms of human life and relationship on and with this earth.

== Bibliography ==
- Baylac, Marie-Hélène (2024), Louise Michel, Paris: Perrin, ISBN 978-2262097714
- Bouhey, Vivien (2008), Les Anarchistes contre la République [The Anarchists against the Republic] (in French), Rennes: Presses universitaires de Rennes (PUR)
- Chambelland, Colette; Davranche, Guillaume; Ula, Josef (2024). "POUGET Émile [POUGET Jean, Joseph, Émile]". Dictionnaire des anarchistes (in French). Paris: Maitron/Editions de l'Atelier.
- Chambost, Anne-Sophie (2017), "" Nous ferons de notre pire… ". Anarchie, illégalisme … et lois scélérates" ["We'll Do our Worse". Anarchy, Illegalism … and Evil Law], Droit et Cultures, 74 (2): 65–87, doi:10.4000/droitcultures.4264
- Guérin, Daniel (2012), "Émile Pouget (1860-1931)", Ni Dieu ni Maître : une anthologie de l'anarchisme, Paris: La Découverte
- Eisenzweig, Uri (2001). Fictions de l'anarchisme [Fictions of anarchism] (in French). France: C. Bourgois. ISBN 2-267-01570-6.
- Jourdain, Edouard (2013). L'anarchisme [Anarchism]. Paris: La Découverte. ISBN 978-2-7071-9091-8.
- Meunier, Yves (2017), La Bande noire - Propagande par le fait dans le bassin minier (1878–1885), Paris: L'Echappée
- Ward, Colin (2004). Anarchism: A Very Short Introduction. Oxford University Press (OUP).
