= Louise Michel–Marie Ferré group =

Louise Michel-Marie Ferré group
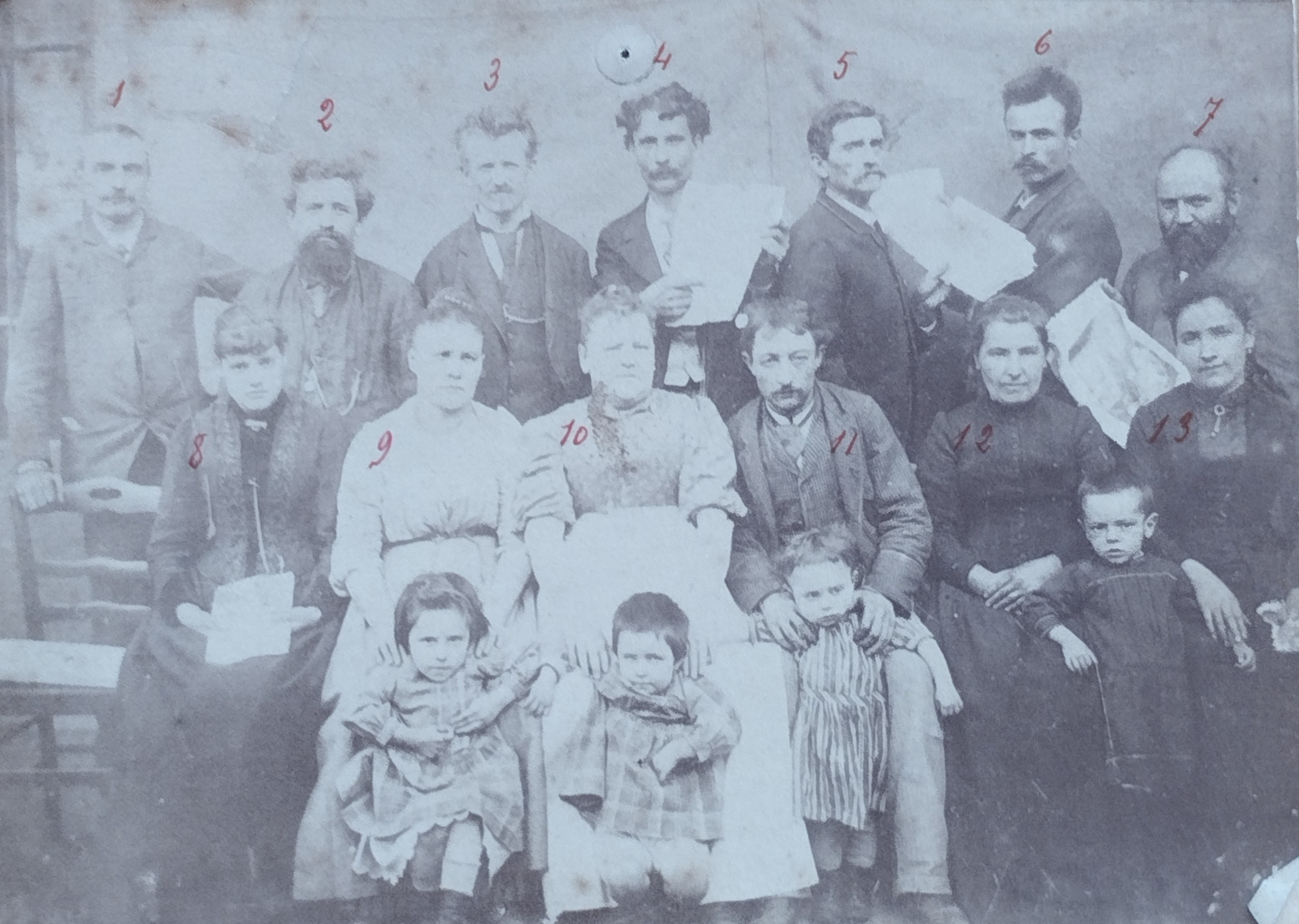
- Photograph featuring numerous anarchists, at least some of whom, such as Adélaïde Mitteaux (10), were members of the group (collections of Archives Anarchistes)
- Dates active: 1880 — after 1886/1887
- Active regions: Lyon, Rhône (département)
- Ideology: Anarchism; Feminism
- Political position: Far-left
- Size: 40+

The Louise Michel-Marie Ferré group was an anarchist and feminist group founded in Lyon, France, in 1880 and active during the 1880s. Bringing together about forty anarchists, it was the first or one of the first female anarchist groups in history. It occupies a notable place in the history of anarchism, marking the entry of women into the movement, developing numerous points of theory, and being among the first circles to fly the black flag.

While anarchism was undergoing ideological formation and beginning to spread across Europe, women remained sidelined and discriminated against within the movement. This situation began to evolve in the late 1870s when several anarchists supported their inclusion and they moved into anarchism. The Louise Michel group was founded in 1880 with the idea of gathering women into an anarchist organization of their own and thus organizing among themselves. Participating in conferences, some with Louise Michel, whose name they took before renaming themselves in honor of Marie Ferré, they distributed anarchist propaganda and wrote in the newspapers of the first period of the Lyon anarchist press. There, they defended new positions within the burgeoning political movement, including the intersectionality of feminist and anarchist struggles and the idea that a revolutionary alliance of women was possible at the national and international levels; they henceforth considered women as a revolutionary group in their own right and not as the supporters of men. Fanny Madignier, a notable member of the group, was implicated in the Assommoir bombing in October 1882 after making inflammatory remarks in support of the miners of the Montceau-les-Mines troubles. She subsequently disappeared and managed to flee the French authorities.

According to some historians, the group succeeded in creating a female anarchist network in France at the very least. Many other women's groups were created in parallel or subsequently based on its model; it spread demographically and thus marked a turning point for the place of women within the anarchist movement.

== History ==
=== Context ===
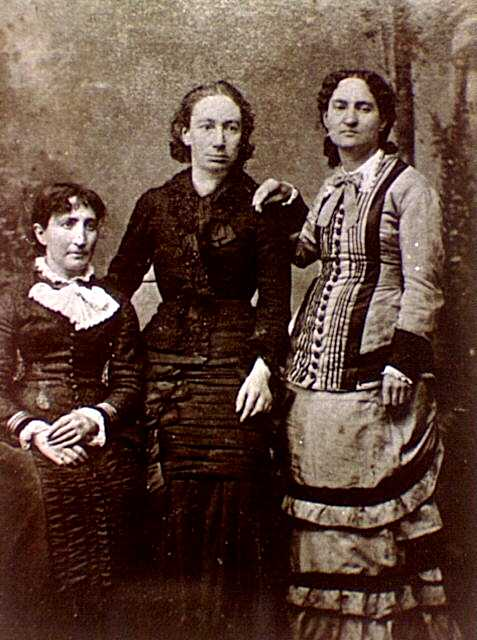
Marie Ferré, Louise Michel and Paule Mink (c. 1871)

From the founding of the anarchist movement during the Saint-Imier Congress in 1872, Lyon and the Rhône region in general quickly became an important hub for the anarchist movement. They formed a more or less informal Lyonnese Revolutionary Federation due to the fact that the French authorities banned the Anti-authoritarian International in France and it was therefore semi-clandestine. Their numbers grew without interruption in the city, so much so that it could be called one of the 'capitals' of the anarchist movement during this period.

Furthermore, despite the stated openness of anarchism, which claims to oppose all forms of domination, its first decade was marked by an initially almost exclusively male presence. This situation began to evolve at the end of the 1870s, particularly in Lyon, when several women (often in couples with anarchists but not always) joined the movement. The orientation of opening up to women was officially undertaken by several figures of the movement; a manifesto sent to Lyon from Switzerland, for example, mentioned the fact that 'women [must also occupy themselves] with propaganda'.

French society in 1880 was a society where women were discriminated against legally, socially, and culturally.

=== Louise Michel-Marie Ferré group ===
Anti-authoritarian International and anarchist groups along the French-Swiss border in the early 1880s.

In 1880, the Louise Michel group was founded in Lyon. It brought together several anarchists, including Adélaïde Mitteaux or Fanny Madignier and her sister, Virginie. The group gathered about forty anarchists in their thirties. Its name was taken in tribute to Louise Michel, who was still alive and had returned from exile; the latter knew the group, visited them occasionally, and interacted with some of its members.

The organization's headquarters were located at 12 rue des Fantasques in Lyon, and it engaged in several activities, such as selling pamphlets written by Michel whose profits served to help the labour movement, or organizing conferences, including a series held in 1882 featuring Michel as a speaker.

They were fully part of the first period of the Lyon anarchist press (1882–1884), contributing to numerous titles in this series and featuring the first anarchist press texts written by women other than Michel; in total, they published more than twenty texts there. Presenting their program in Le Droit social, one of the titles in this series, they stated, in a declaration where it was no longer up to women to assist proletarians but the reverse:

Our program is and always has been: 1) Complete revolution in the current state of society; 2) Equality for all workers of both sexes: the moral and material uplift of women, and their complete emancipation in the future society. To this end, we will employ all means in our power to achieve as quickly as possible, with the help of the proletarians, the advent of the social revolution.

In 1882, the group changed its name at the request of Michel, whom the naming made somewhat uncomfortable, to rename itself Marie Ferré, after another Communard figure close to the anarchists who had recently passed away. This evolution reflected internal power dynamics that are not easy to evaluate and seem to revolve around the departure of Marie Labouret-Finet in 1882. Later in the decade, the group took back the name Louise Michel or associated the two, although the reasons for these changes are not clear either.

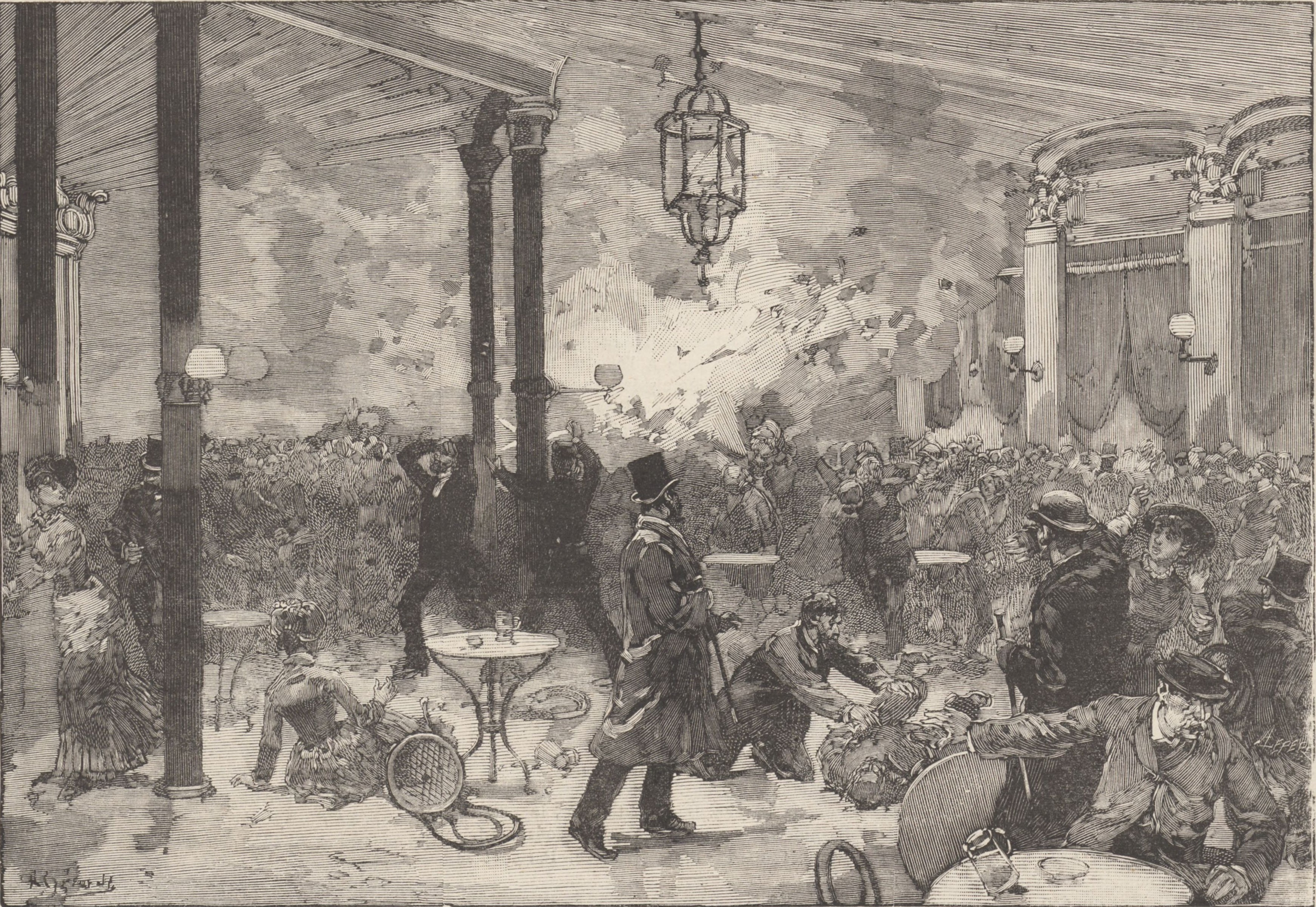
Romanced depiction of the Assommoir bombing in Le Monde illustré (11 November 1882)

On 9 September, Madignier represented the Marie Ferré group and the 'mothers and sisters of the proletarians' in a meeting dedicated to the Montceau-les-Mines troubles. Both black and red flags were displayed during the meeting. Before being applauded by a portion of the 600-strong audience, she declared:

The revolutionary flash that has just struck in Montceau must liberate us all from our exploiters.

The following month, the anarchist became the primary suspect in the Assommoir bombing, the first deadly anarchist attack in French history. She managed to flee and disappear, probably to Switzerland.

The group continued its activity during the following years in the Rhône region, at least until 1886 or 1887. It was noted for having an 'unusual longevity' for an anarchist group of that period, as such groups tended to be quickly banned.

== Thought ==
=== Anarchism and feminism ===
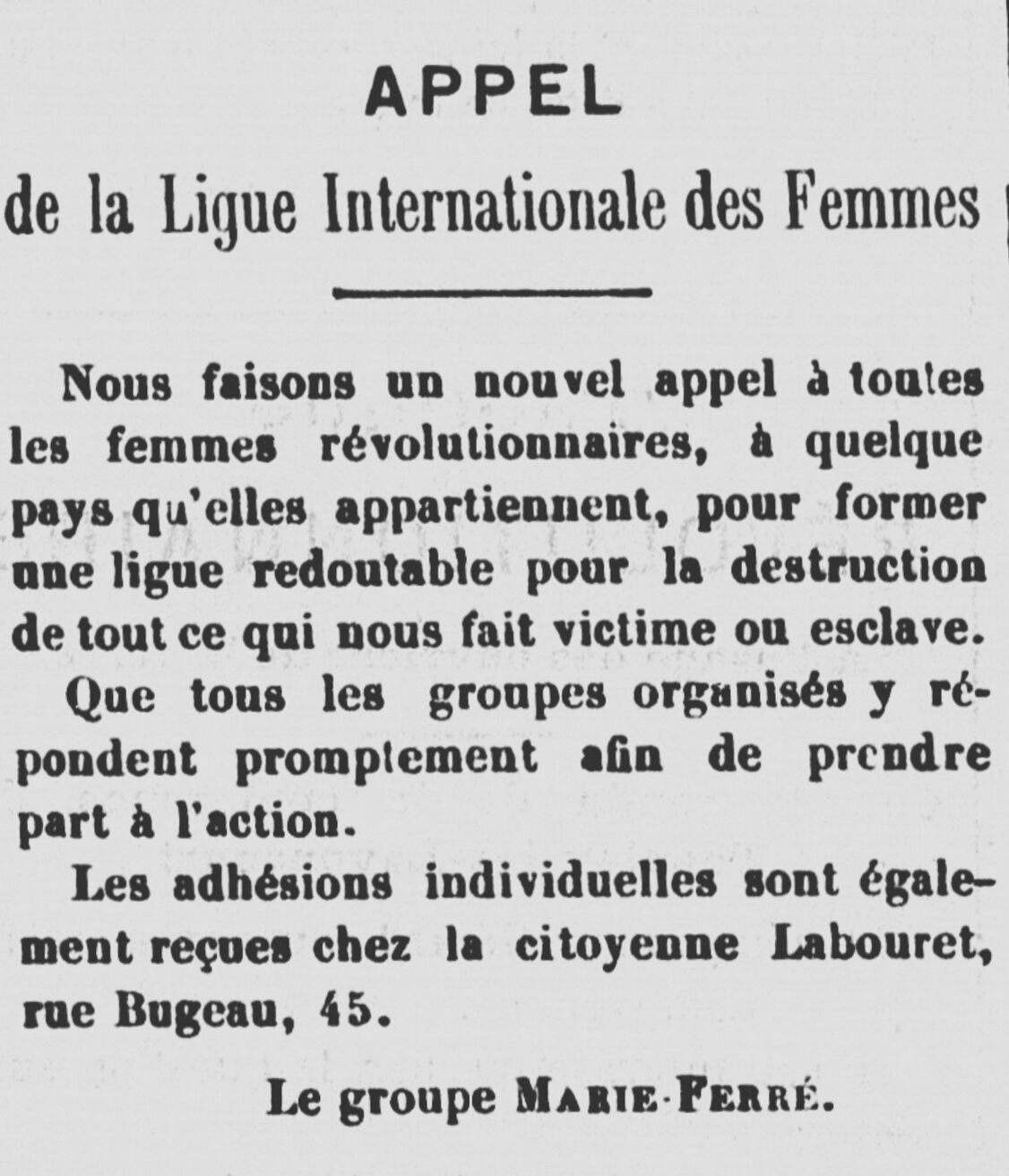
Call to an International League of Women in L'Étendard révolutionnaire (20 August 1882)

The group clearly linked anarchism and feminism in its thought. This orientation began first and foremost with a critique of the broader anarchist movement; they highlighted the discrimination they faced within the movement and compared it with that suffered by women outside of it. Nevertheless, they remained anarchists and wished to lead the anarchist social revolution. In this way, the anarchists adopted a position marked by the intersectionality of struggles, blending the situation of women with the revolution against the State and capitalism, as these battles were to be fought simultaneously.

Notably, the group saw the feminist struggle as distinct from the anti-capitalist struggle; for them, there existed a specific state of oppression uniting women across social classes; since they were discriminated against as women, they could unite as women, become anarchists, and lead the revolution together.

=== Feminist internationalism ===
Based on this final point, the members of the group developed an ideology blending feminism and internationalism. Given that women of all classes formed, in themselves, a revolutionary class due to the fact that they were discriminated against, they sought to unite women on an international level and make them revolutionaries and anarchists. According to historian Marie-Pier Tardif, by beginning to make these links, the anarchists seemed to want to create a female counterpart to the anti-authoritarian International, the main anarchist organization of the period; they thus envisioned the creation of female anarchist structures and the extension of their group's model (women-only) to much larger scales.

== Legacy ==
=== Creation of a female anarchist network in France ===
The Louise Michel-Marie Ferré group was credited by Tardif as having created a female anarchist network in France; not only did the group's interventions in the first anarchist newspapers in France mark the entry of women into the anarchist movement, but they also wove important networks across France, connecting with numerous emerging female anarchist groups. According to Tardif, the group thus marked a 'before and after' for the presence of women within the anarchist movement.

== Bibliography ==
- Bébin, Lionel (1996), Les tentatives de reconstituer la Première Internationale et les débuts du mouvement anarchiste à Lyon (mémoire) [The Attempts to Reconstruct the First International and the Beginnings of the Anarchist Movement in Lyon, 1871–1881 (memoir)], Lyon: University Lyon II
- Chambost, Anne-Sophie (2017), "« Nous ferons de notre pire… ». Anarchie, illégalisme … et lois scélérates" [«We’ll Do our Worse». Anarchy, Illegalism … and Evil Law], Droit et Cultures (in French), 74 (2): 65–87, doi:10.4000/droitcultures.4264
- Dupuy, Rolf (2025), "MADINIER, Marie [MONNIN, Fany, Marie, Françoise dite]", Dictionnaire international des militants anarchistes, Paris
- Petit, Dominique (2024), "MADIGNIER Fanny (MONNIN Marie, Françoise, dite Madignier ou Madinier)", Dictionnaire des anarchistes (Le Maitron), Paris: Le Maitron des anarchistes
- Tardif, Marie-Pier (2021), Ni ménagères, ni courtisanes. Les femmes de lettres dans la presse anarchiste française (1885-1905) (PhD thesis) [Neither housewives nor courtesans. Women writers in the French anarchist press (1885-1905)] (PDF)
