= First period of the Lyon anarchist press =

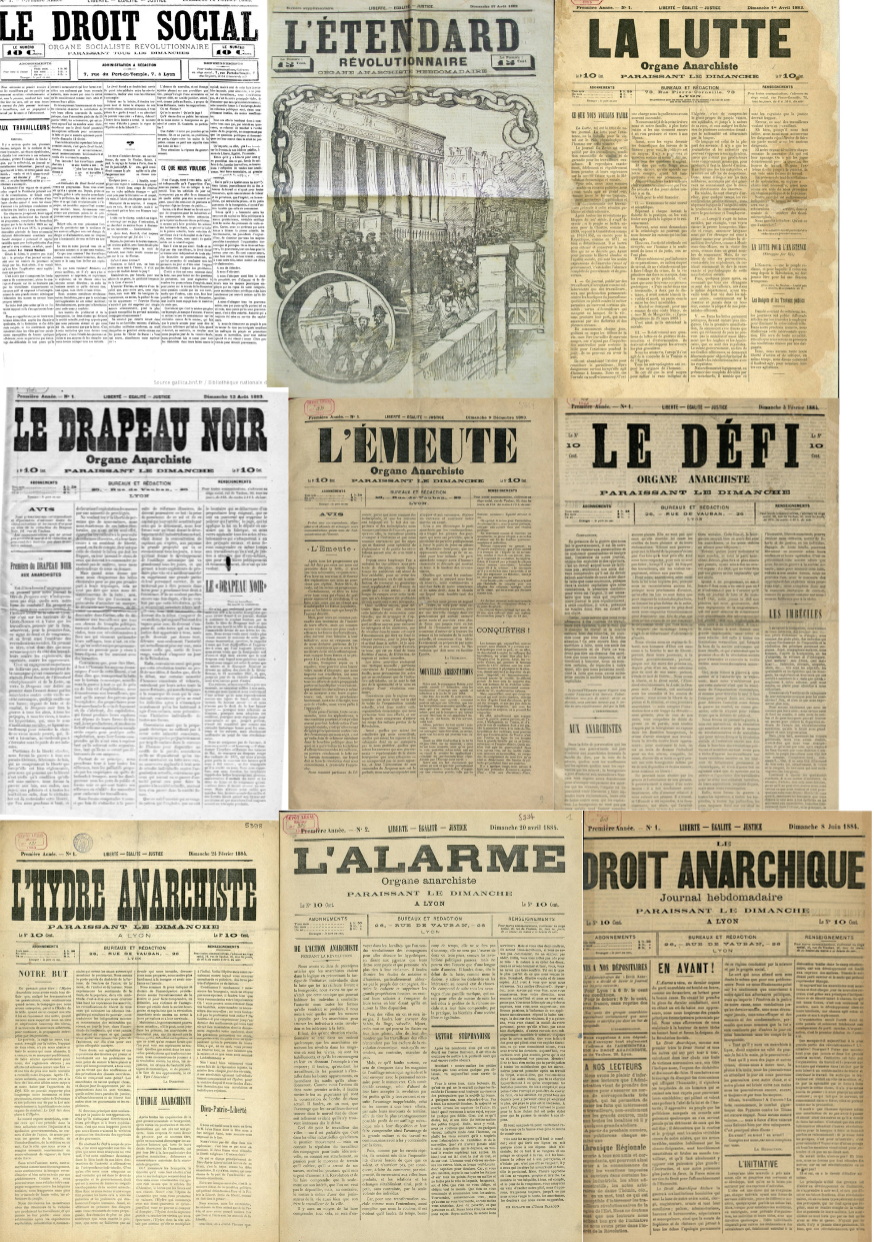
- Organs published during the period, in chronological order: Le Droit social, L'Étendard révolutionnaire, La Lutte, Le Drapeau noir, L'Émeute, Le Défi, L'Hydre anarchiste, L'Alarme, and Le Droit anarchique
- Founder(s): Louise Michel; Antoine Cyvoct; Jean Grave; Toussaint Bordat; Vincent Berthout
- Founded: 1882
- Ceased publication: 1884
- Political alignment: Anarchism; Anarcho-communism
- Language: French
- Headquarters: Lyon

The first period of the Lyon anarchist press, or the Lyon series of 1882-1884, is a period in the history of Lyon, the history of anarchism, and the history of the press in France marked by a proliferation of anarchist publications in Lyon and the broader Rhône department. These newspapers were among the first anarchist publications in France; they generally succeeded one another following government bans and served as an anchor for the anarchist thought and movement in France.

Although anarchists in France previously had an initial newspaper, La Révolution sociale, published in Paris, it disappeared at the end of 1881. Lyon was then considered one of the 'capitals' of the anarchist movement. Since Bakunin had participated in the Lyon Commune ten years earlier, anarchists had grown in number there, influenced by the proximity of neighboring Switzerland. Taking advantage of the new press law, Lyonnese anarchists raised funds and launched their first newspaper, Le Droit social, which featured contributions from several leading figures of anarchism, such as Louise Michel, Jean Grave, the Lyonnese Antoine Cyvoct and Toussaint Bordat, and Peter Kropotkin. This was the second anarchist newspaper in France and the first of the Lyon series.

In the months and years that followed, as repression against anarchists in Lyon intensified, following the Montceau-les-Mines troubles by the Black Band, the Assommoir bombing, and the Trial of the 66, they systematically recreated their banned newspapers. Le Droit social thus gave way to L'Étendard révolutionnaire, La Lutte, Le Drapeau noir, L'Émeute, Le Défi, L'Hydre anarchiste, L'Alarme, and Le Droit anarchique. Some of these newspapers, such as Le Drapeau noir, were influential in the broader history of anarchism, helping to transform the black flag of the Canuts into the anarchist black flag, a symbol shared by the entire movement in the 21st century. The banning of Le Droit anarchique marked the end of this first period. These publications also signaled the emergence of a female anarchist readership in France.

== History ==
=== Background : La Révolution sociale and anarchism in Lyon ===
La Révolution sociale ('The Social Revolution') by Égide Spilleux, known as Serreaux, was the first anarchist press organ in France, being published in Paris between 1880 and 1881.

Lyon and the Lyon region in general quickly became an important hub for anarchism—anarchists there formed a Lyonnese Federation. Lyonnese anarchists operated in a climate of repression and surveillance from the French authorities. However, in 1878, they decided to acquire a newspaper and founded a society, Le Droit social, intended to raise funds for the creation of an eponymous newspaper. Unfortunately for them, the law then required a deposit (cautionnement)—that is, a deposit of funds with the authorities—to be allowed to publish, which made such an initiative difficult for financial and practical reasons, as anarchist newspapers tended to be rapidly banned in France.

=== First series (1882) ===
==== Le Droit social (February–July) ====
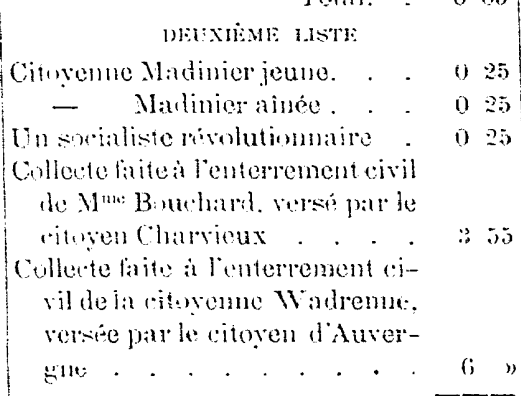
Fanny and Virginie Madignier in Le Droit social, noted as subscribers

In 1882, following the new press freedom law of 1881, the situation changed with the suppression of this deposit requirement, and Le Droit social was founded in Lyon in February 1882. It was heavily monitored by the French authorities; every issue was sparingly analyzed, the special commissaire of Lyon sought to discover the precise authors of each article, and authorities initiated numerous prosecutions against the successive managers of the newspaper.

It was the second anarchist publication in France, following La Révolution sociale by Égide Spilleux (1880). The newspaper brought together a significant number of anarchist figures in France during this period; historian René Bianco identifies the following names as likely participants in Le Droit social:

Bonthoux, Denechère, Gustave Falies, Émile Gautier, Jean Grave, Louise Michel, Lucien Pemjean, Élisée Reclus, A. Tressaud, Vermesch, Félicien Bonnet, [Toussaint] Bordat, Chavrier, Claude Crestin, Antoine Crié, [Antoine] Cyvoct, J. Damians, F. and L. Dejoux, Dervieux, Feuillade, Georges Garraud, Genoud, Jules Morel, Thomas, Charles Voisin, etc.

The newspaper adopted the motto 'Liberty, equality, justice', which all subsequent titles in the 'Lyon series' would later use. According to Bianco, the managers were Louis Dejoux, followed by Bonthoux after the former was sentenced to one year in prison. In its fourth issue, the journal listed the names of 15 secretaries of the Lyonese Federation; it also published communications from various anarchist groups across France, particularly from anarchist women's groups.

Le Droit social also distributed brochures, printing some of its articles in this format and selling them for 15 cents each. The publication was banned on 23 July 1882 and was replaced the following week by L'Étendard révolutionnaire.

==== L'Étendard révolutionnaire (August–October) ====
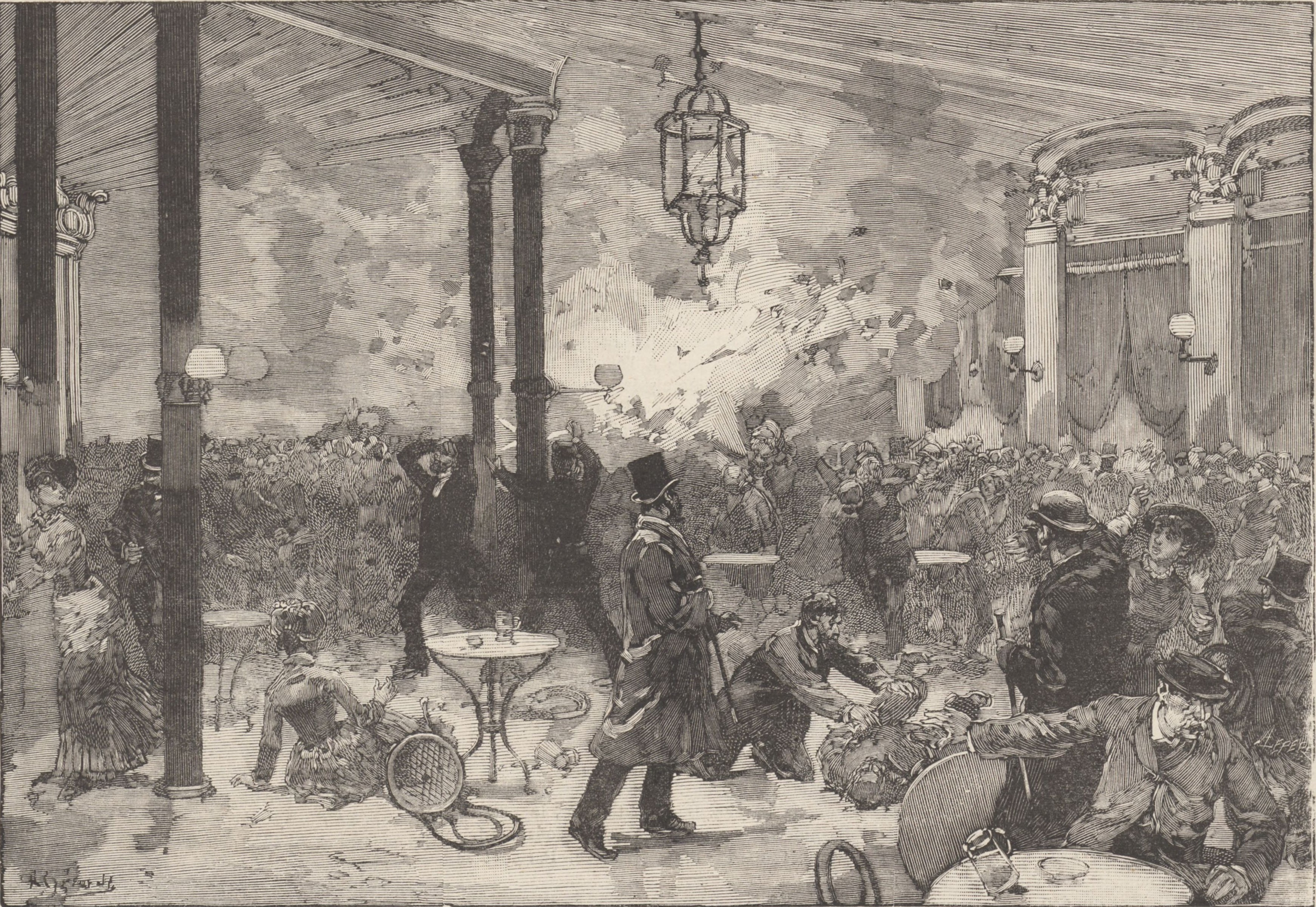
Romanced depiction of the Assommoir bombing in Le Monde illustré (11 November 1882)

The first issue of L'Étendard révolutionnaire was published one week after the previous newspaper ceased publication, on 30 July 1882. No articles were signed, but the following anarchists—a group thought to be close or identical to that of Le Droit social—are believed to have contributed to the newspaper:

Félicien Bonnet, Toussaint Bordat, Jean Marie Bourdon, Jean Antoine Coindre, Joseph Cottaz, Claude Crestin, Antoine Cyvoct, Joseph Damians, François Dejoux, Nicolas Didelin (who was a second cousin of Louise Michel), Régis Faure, Georges Garraud, César Mathon, Hyacinthe Trenta, Joseph Trenta.

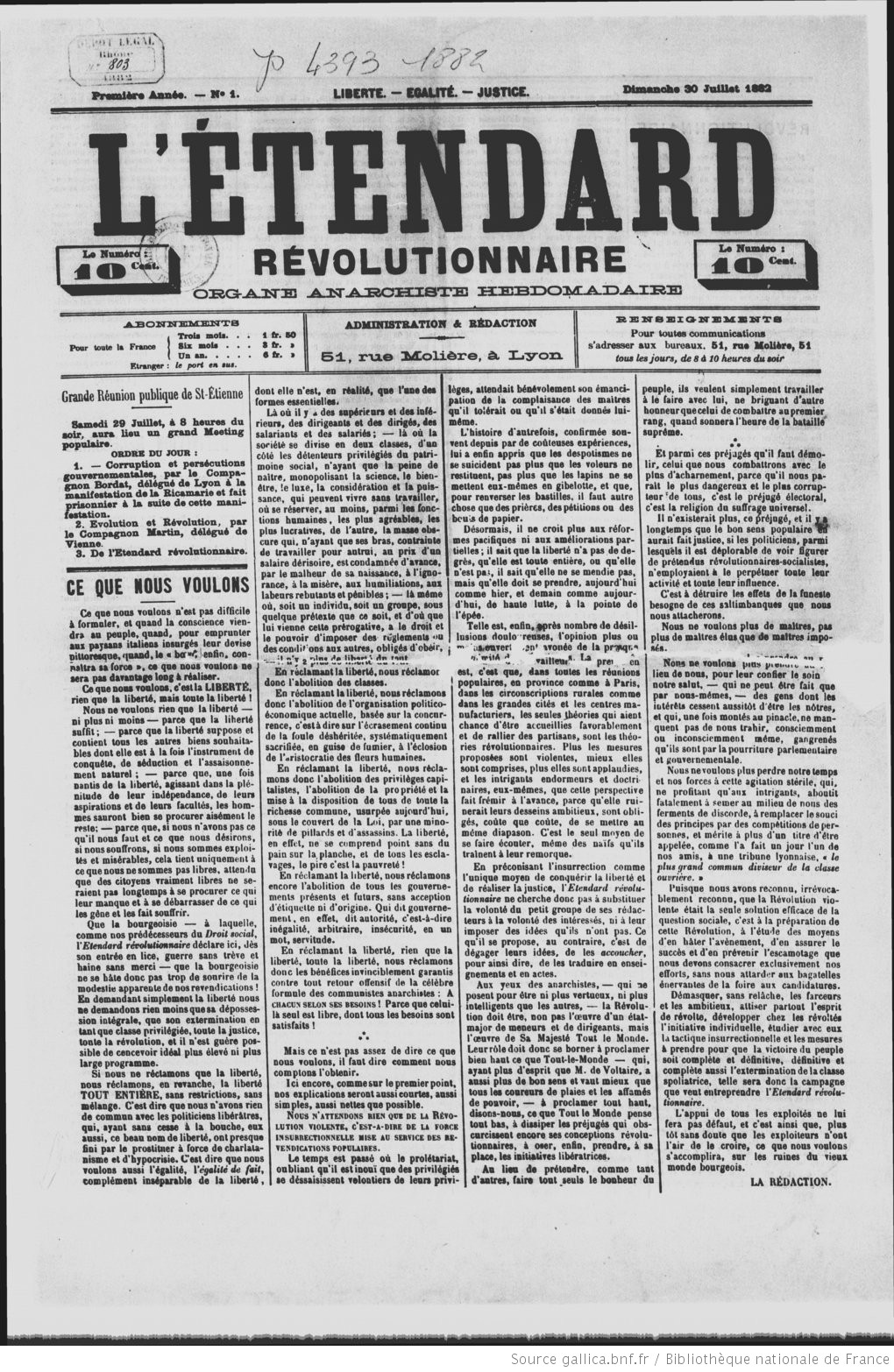
First issue of L'Étendard révolutionnaire (30 July 1882)

The printer in charge was Pastel, who collaborated with the French authorities to transmit information about the newspaper. The publication, through Toussaint Bordat, was linked to the Black Band and the Montceau-les-Mines troubles: the newspaper thus published several communiqués from the Black Band including one in which it used the black flag as a symbol, eight months before the demonstration of 9 March 1883 where Louise Michel displayed this flag and made it a central symbol of the anarchist movement. Bordat also traveled personally to Montceau-les-Mines and spoke publicly there in support of the miners.

Lyon was particularly volatile at the time, especially since the city was affected by a widespread famine—children had to go to the barracks to beg the soldiers for bread for their families. On 19 August 1882, four days after the riot or revolt launched by the Black Band in Montceau-les-Mines, the premises of L'Étendard révolutionnaire were raided. Repression against the publication increased in the following months, as the Black Band continued its attacks and the trial of the first arrested individuals approached—the Lyonnese movement was heavily repressed.

In October 1882, while the trial of those accused of the Black Band riot had been underway for six days, the Assomoir bombing occurred on 23 October—when Fanny Madignier and other anarchists attacked a restaurant associated with the Lyonnese bourgeoisie by throwing a bomb. A person who tried to extinguish the burning projectile had their legs pulverized and died from their injuries four days later. A second attack occurred the same day against a barracks in Lyon.

This date corresponds to the last publication of L'Étendard révolutionnaire, which then ceased. Its manager at the time, Antoine Cyvoct, was indeed accused by the French authorities of being primarily responsible for the attack—he allegedly named the restaurant in an article and was supposedly in Lyon at the time of the events. He denied these claims—including after his release fourteen years later—maintaining that he was in Switzerland at the time, not Lyon, and that he was not the author of the incriminating article. He was tried, acquitted of participation in the attack, but found to be the author of the incriminating press article and sentenced to death for this article. This sentence was later commuted to life imprisonment in the penal colony before he was released in 1897. In parallel, the Trial of the 66 in early 1883 was the climax of this episode of significant repression affecting the anarchist movement in France.

According to Bordat, Bonthoux, and Daman himself, Daman was allegedly the signatory of the incriminating article—it is possible that Valadier was the author.

In total, L'Étendard révolutionnaire published 12 issues and gave way to other subsequent press titles, like La Lutte.

=== Second series (1883-1884) ===
==== La Lutte (April–August 1883) ====
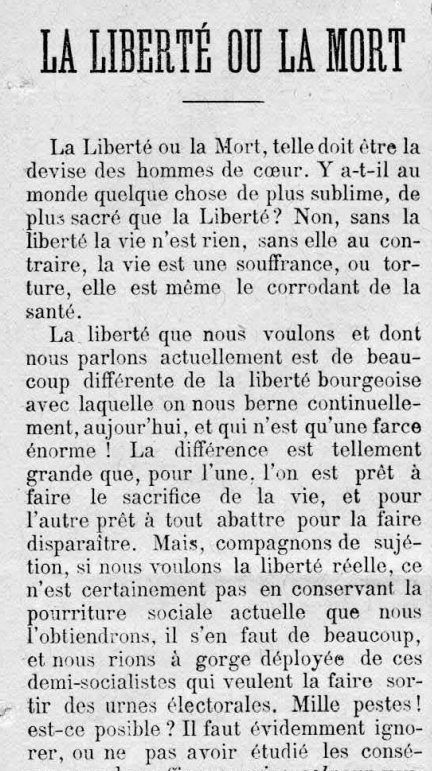
Article 'Freedom or death' in Le Drapeau noir (N°13)

On 1 April 1883, shortly after the anarchist demonstration of 9 March 1883, Lyonnese anarchists established a new newspaper under the title La Lutte ('The Struggle'). Historian René Bianco identifies the following individuals as the primary editors:

Jules Boissy, Léon Domergue, Henri Tricot, and Louis Chautant.

The newspaper printed its ninth issue on red paper to commemorate the Bloody Week. It also supported propaganda of the deed through a column titled Produits anti-bourgeois ('Anti-bourgeois products'), published from the fourteenth to the seventeenth issues, which provided methods for carrying out such actions. The journal published nineteen issues in total, leading to swift legal proceedings against the periodical's two managers, Morel and Chautant, before it was eventually banned.

==== Le Drapeau noir (August–December 1883) ====
Shortly thereafter, the newspaper Le Drapeau noir ('The Black Flag') was founded as the successor to La Lutte.

Its motto, like that of the previous title, was 'Liberty, Equality, Justice'. Aligning itself with previous Lyonnese anarchist publications, it announced that it was adopting the black flag as its emblem, this time distancing itself more overtly from the socialist red flag:

Daily events and facts have shown us clearly that the red flag, so glorious in defeat, could very well, in victory, cover the ambitious dreams of a few low-level schemers with its flaming folds. Since it has already sheltered a government and served as the banner of a constituted authority, we realized that for us—the daily undisciplined and the hourly rebels—it could be nothing more than an embarrassment or a lure.

Among the reasons for choosing the black flag, the connection to the Canuts was defended clearly and explicitly in the very first issue.

According to historian René Bianco, the journal's collaborators included Auguste Baudry, Clovis Demure, Léon Domergue, Marius Monfray, and the anarchist Vitre.

The newspaper, which released its first issue on 12 August 1883, published a total of 17 issues until 2 December 1883. Following the legal proceedings brought against it, it gave way to the next Lyonnese publication, L'Émeute ('The Riot').

==== L'Émeute (December 1883-January 1884) ====
With the ban on the previous title issued on 2 December 1883, Lyon's anarchists established a new title, L'Émeute ('The Riot'), on 9 December. In its first issue, the paper explained the reasons behind the choice of this name, stating:

We are partisans of the riot, because we are undisciplined, and riots have always been the work of the impatient and the undisciplined; we are partisans of the riot because, through it, the worker can test their own initiative, and we are convinced that the 'wise' who specialize in regulating and guiding revolutions will take care to stay away.

In its fourth issue, the journal explicitly referenced previous titles and announced that its goal was the anarchist social revolution.

The printing house was located at 52 rue Ferrandière in Lyon. Historian René Bianco has identified several authors, even though the articles were unsigned; they are believed to be Vincent Berthout, Léon Domergue, and Claude Grillot.

The newspaper spanned seven issues, from 9 December 1883, to 20 January 1884, before being banned in its turn and giving way to the next press organ, Le Défi.

==== Le Défi (February 1884) ====
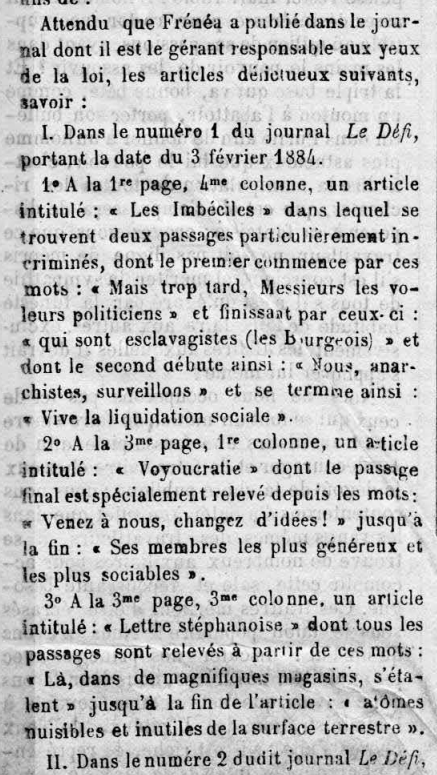
Le Défi providing a copy of the indictment against its manager, Frénéa, before the Rhône Assize Court (N°3)

Following the ban on L’Émeute, Lyon's anarchists established a new newspaper titled Le Défi ('The Challenge/The Defiance'). The articles were either unsigned or published under pseudonyms; however, historian René Bianco managed to identify two of the publication's managers, J. M. Frenea and G. Robert. Frenea was prosecuted as early as the second issue for articles published in the paper.

The newspaper was printed at 28 Rue de la Guillotière.

After it was banned following its third issue on 17 February 1884, the publication was succeeded by L'Hydre anarchiste ('The Anarchist Hydra').

==== L'Hydre anarchiste (February–March 1884) ====
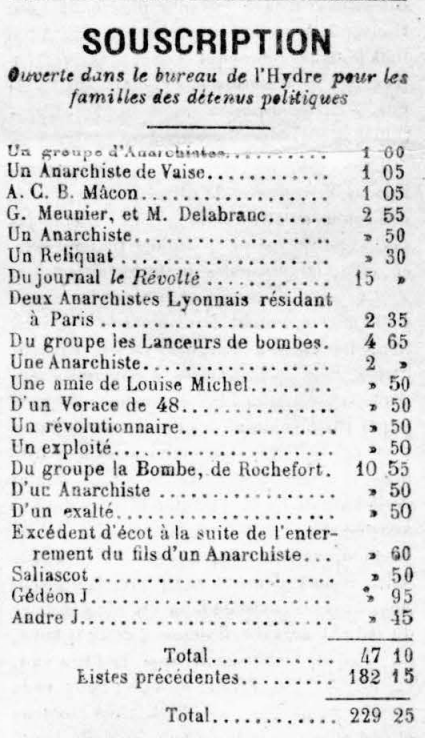
Subscribers to the Hydre anarchiste crowdfunding for a project, including at least two women, in the third issue

Following the final issue of Le Défi, which was banned on 17 February, the Lyonnese anarchists established a new newspaper named L'Hydre anarchiste. Among its contributors were Antoine Cyvoct and Georges Garraud, known as 'Valadier'.

The second issue of the journal, dated 2 March, was almost entirely dedicated to defending Cyvoct during his trial. The fourth issue, published on 16 March, commemorated the Paris Commune and was printed on purple paper.

While René Bianco did not identify the manager in his study of the newspaper, an individual named G. Robert was later identified by Pierre Sommermeyer in the Dictionnaire international des militants anarchistes (DIMA). It is also possible that the companion Vincent Berthout was part of the editorial team.

L'Hydre anarchiste advocated for propaganda by the deed and was one of the many anarchist publications of that era to support this strategy. The newspaper was interrupted on 30 March 1884, after its sixth issue, making way for its successor, L'Alarme ('The Alarm').

==== L'Alarme (April–June 1884) ====
The banning of L'Hydre anarchiste prompted the Lyonnese to establish a new newspaper: L'Alarme. Its articles were unsigned, but Clovis Demure served as the editorial secretary.

As with some of the previous titles, printing took place at 26 rue Vauban. The fourth issue was printed on purple paper and contained a poster.

The publication was banned on the 1st of June 1884, and was replaced by Le Droit anarchique ('The Anarchist Right/Law').

==== Le Droit anarchique (June 1884) ====
Le Droit anarchique ('The Anarchist Right/Law') was founded shortly after the banning of L'Alarme. Historian René Bianco does not identify the authors of the newspaper's articles, which are unsigned, but mentions that Vincent Berthout likely participated in its writing and that G. Fronteau, followed by Isidore Mounier, served as the publication's managers.

The printing of the title took place at 70 cours de la Liberté in Lyon. Like its predecessors, it was quickly prosecuted; its first manager was arrested as early as the first issue. It managed to survive for a total of three issues before being banned, ending with its final edition on 22 June 1884.

Its prohibition marked the end of the first period of the Lyon anarchist press, which was characterized by numerous titles appearing in succession between 1882 and 1884 amidst frequent bans.

== Legacy ==
=== Establishment of anarchism in France ===
These newspapers, which were among the first anarchist publications in France and which Vincent Banssillon examined in his study of Lyon as a 'capital' of the anarchist movement during this period, formed a true proliferation of publications. They allowed the anarchist movement to expand from the Croix-Rousse, the historic district of anarchists and canuts, toward more distant areas of Lyon, such as the Brotteaux and La Guillotière districts.

Some of them, such as L'Étendard révolutionnaire and even more so Le Drapeau noir, were influential in transforming the black flag of the canuts into the anarchist black flag, which has since become one of the central symbols of this political movement.

=== Birth of a female anarchist readership in France ===
In her study of female anarchists during the Belle Époque, Marie-Pier Tardif uses certain newspapers from this series, such as L'Hydre anarchiste, to illustrate the birth of a female anarchist readership in France during this period. This emergence is reflected in several of the newspaper's articles specifically addressed to women.

=== Memorial legacy ===
An associative community space in Crest took the name L'Hydre in reference to L'Hydre anarchiste.

== Works ==
- Full collections on the Archives Autonomies website

== Bibliography ==
- Beaubernard, Robert (1981), Montceau-les-Mines: Un laboratoire social au XIXe siècle [Montceau-les-Mines: A social laboratory in the 19th century], Avallon: Éditions de Civry, p. 316, ISBN 978-2-85983-024-3
- Chambost, Anne-Sophie (2017), "" Nous ferons de notre pire… ". Anarchie, illégalisme … et lois scélérates" [«We’ll Do our Worse». Anarchy, Illegalism … and Evil Law], Droit et Cultures, 74 (2): 65–87, doi:10.4000/droitcultures.4264
- Davranche, Guillaume (2020), Dix questions sur l'anarchisme [Ten questions on anarchism] (in French), Montreuil: Libertalia, ISBN 978-2-37729-119-9
- Tardif, Marie-Pier (2021), Ni ménagères, ni courtisanes. Les femmes de lettres dans la presse anarchiste française (1885-1905) (PhD thesis) [Neither housewives nor courtesans. Women writers in the French anarchist press (1885-1905)] (PDF)
