= Théophile Ferré =

French revolutionary (1845–1871)

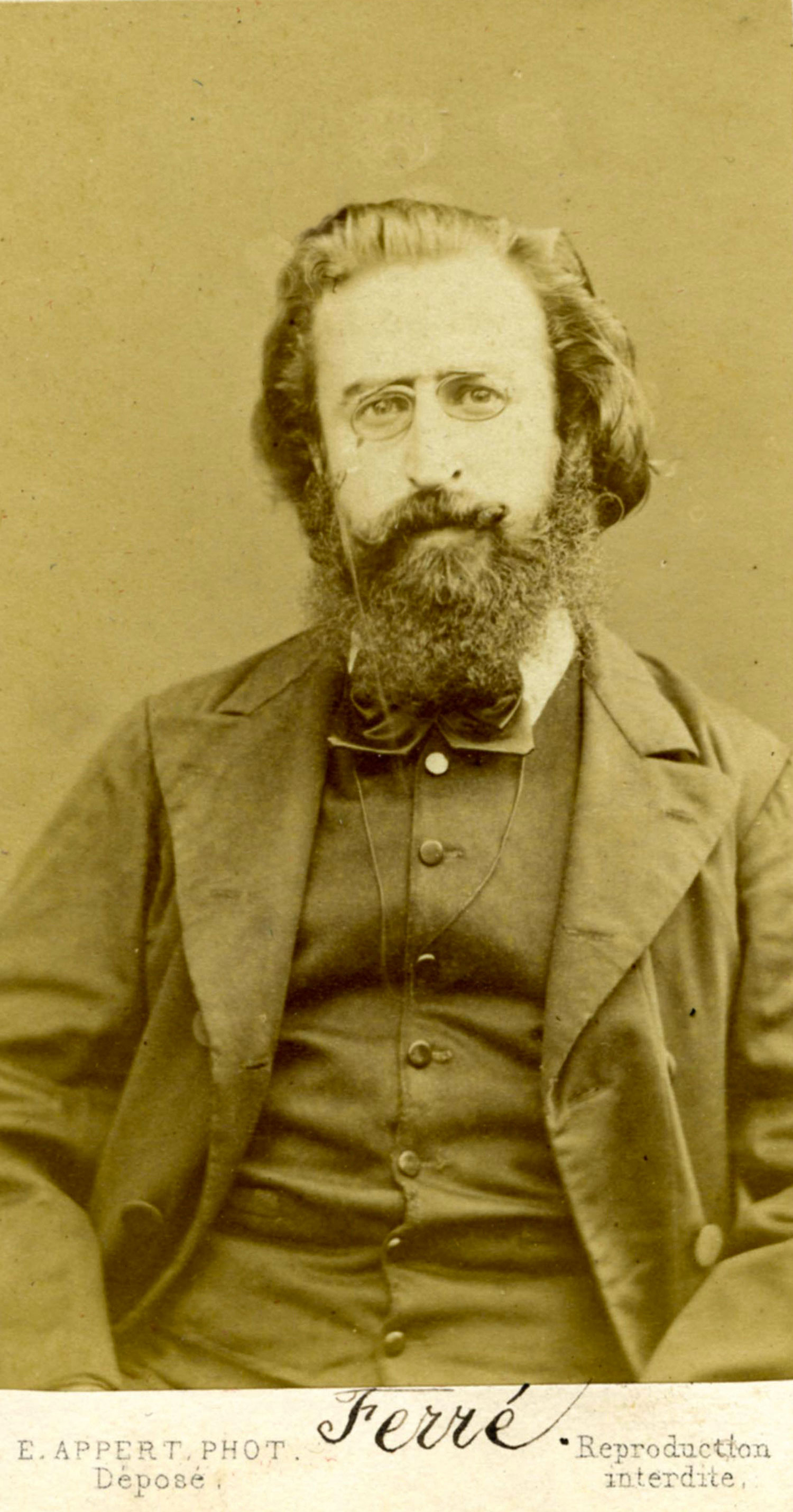
- Théophile Ferré (1871)
- Born: May 6, 1845; Paris
- Died: November 28, 1871 (aged 26); Satory, France
- Resting place: Levallois-Perret Cemetery
- Known for: Ordering the execution of hostages of the Paris Commune
- Relatives: Marie Ferré (sister)

Théophile Charles Gilles Ferré (6 May 1845 – 28 November 1871) was one of the members of the Paris Commune. He authorized the executions of Georges Darboy, the archbishop of Paris, and five other hostages, on 24 May 1871. He was captured by the army, tried by a military court, and was shot at Satory (an army camp southwest of Versailles). He was the first of twenty-five Commune members to be executed for their role in the Paris Commune.

== Early life ==
There are few known facts on Ferré's early life, although he may have worked as a law clerk. He was a follower of the revolutionary Louis-Auguste Blanqui and in July 1870, he was tried for being part of a plot to assassinate Napoleon III, but he was acquitted because of a lack of evidence. During the Siege of Paris, he was elected to the Comité de vigilance de Montmartre (the Montmartre Committee of Vigilance).

== Paris Commune ==
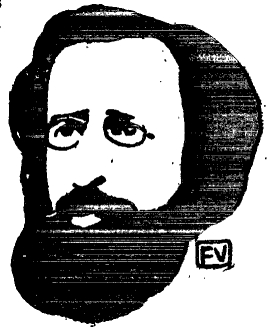
An 1897 woodcut portrait of Théophile Ferré by Félix Vallotton

Paris was taken over by the revolutionary, Commune government in March 1871. Ferré served on the Commune's Committee of Public Safety, a body given extensive powers to hunt down enemies of the Commune. He was also briefly in charge of the revolutionary police force.

On April 5, the Commune passed a decree that authorized the arrest of any person thought to be loyal to the French government in Versailles, those arrested were to be held as "hostages of the people of Paris". These included Georges Darboy, the archbishop of Paris, Abbé Deguerry, the curé of the Église de la Madeleine, and several hundred others. The Commune hoped to exchange their hostages for Louis-Auguste Blanqui, a revolutionary and honorary President of the Commune, who had been arrested by the French government on March 15. However, the provisional head of the French government, Adolphe Thiers refused any negotiation with the Commune for the release of hostages.

On 21 May, French government forces entered Paris. This heralded a period of heavy fighting between government troops and National Guards that was known as the Semaine sanglante ("Bloody Week") with Government troops carrying out summary executions of captured National Guardsmen and suspected Communards. By the 24 May, the resistance of the Commune was starting to disintegrate. A delegation of National Guardsmen, led by Gustave Genton, a member of the Committee of Public Safety, came to the new headquarters of the Commune at the city hall of the 11th arrondissement and demanded the immediate execution of the hostages held at the prison of La Roquette. The new prosecutor of the Commune, Ferré hesitated and then wrote a note authorizing the executions.

Genton asked for volunteers to serve as a firing squad, and went to the La Roquette prison, where many of the hostages were being held. Genton selected six names from the list of hostages, including Georges Darboy, the Abbe Deguerry, Bonjean (président de chambre à la Cour de cassation), and Allard, Clerc, Ducoudray, three members of the Society of Jesus. The Director of the Prison, Francois, refused to give up the Archbishop without a specific order from the Commune. Genton sent a deputy back to Ferré to seek this. Ferré replied with the order, writing "and especially the archbishop" on the bottom of his note. The six hostages were then taken out into the courtyard of the prison, lined up against the wall, and shot. Defenders of the Commune later justified the action of Ferré as an act of retaliation for the summary executions carried out by the French Army during Bloody Week.

Ferré was later captured by French government forces. He was tried and sentenced to death at a court martial in August 1871. Early on the morning of the 28 November, he was executed by firing squad, alongside Louis Rossel and Pierre Bourgeois, former French Army members who had defected to the Commune. Ferré declined a blindfold, but was only wounded by the firing squad's volley. He was killed by a single shot fired as a coup de grâce. Gustave Genton was also executed for his role in the killing of the hostages.

Louise Michel, the famed "Red Virgin" of the Commune celebrated in a poem by Victor Hugo, was very close friends with Théophile Ferré (some theorize they were lovers). Both were from the same district: Montmartre. Both took the same defiant attitude at their trial, as described by Lissagaray in his Histoire de la Commune de 1871 (Bruxelles: Kistemaeckers ed, 1876), and both were eventually buried (Michel died in 1905) in the same cemetery.

== Sources ==
- Prosper Olivier Lissagaray: Histoire de la Commune de 1871 (1876) Paris: Librairie Marcel Rivière - Bibliothèque des Sciences Politiques et Sociales, 1947
- Bernard Noël: Dictionnaire de la Commune Paris: Champs Flammarion, 1978
