= Fanny Madignier =

French anarchist (born 1852)

- Born: 29 February 1852; Lyon
- Died: ?
- Occupations: canut/weaver, anarchist
- Known for: First lethal anarchist attack in France
- Movement: Anarchism

Fanny Madignier, born Marie Françoise Monnin on 29 February 1852 in the 4th arrondissement of Lyon and died on an unknown date, was a French canut/weaver and anarchist. She is primarily known for having likely committed the Assommoir bombing, the first lethal anarchist attack in France.

Born into a family of canuts, Madignier began working as a weaver before joining the anarchist movement in France alongside her sister, Virginie. She became a prominent figure in the Lyonnese Revolutionary Federation in the early 1880s, participating in numerous conferences and meetings with her women's group, the Louise Michel-Marie Ferré group.

As the repression on anarchists intensified and the strategy of propaganda by the deed began to be adopted by them, she vocally supported the actions of the Black Band carried out in Montceau-les-Mines. In October 1882, during the trial of the members of the Black Band, she likely participated in the Assommoir bombing in Lyon, targeting a restaurant associated with the Lyonnese bourgeoisie. A dozen people were injured by the explosions and one ultimately died. The anarchist disappeared a few days later, probably after fleeing to Switzerland.

Madignier was found guilty of the attack and sentenced to life imprisonment in a penal colony in absentia two years later; she was never found by the French authorities.

== Biography ==
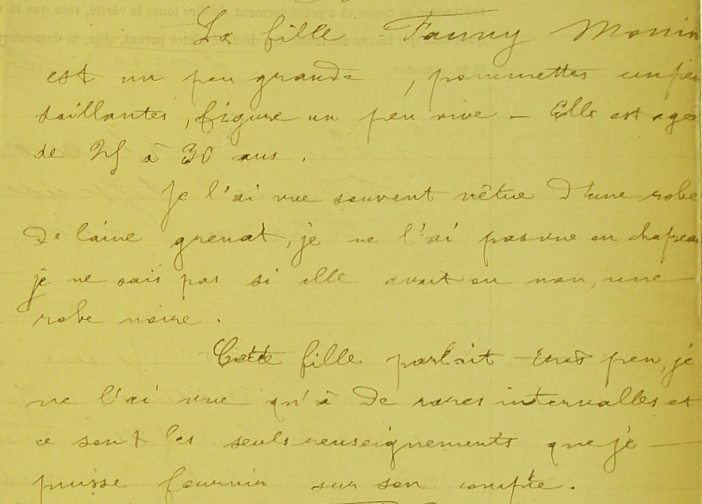
Testimony on Fanny Madignier for the Assommoir bombing, describing her as a very reserved person (collection of Archives Anarchistes)

Marie Françoise Monnin was born on 29 February 1852 in the 4th arrondissement of Lyon. The daughter of Julie Bouton and Claude Monnin, a canut, she also had a sister, Virginie, who later married the anarchist Claude Bernard. Her mother remarried, taking the name Madignier in her second marriage.

Fanny Madignier followed in her father's footsteps and also became a Lyonnese weaver; unlike her sister, she did not marry. She lived with her mother and stepfather at 5 Rue Lebrun, in the Croix-Rousse district, which is deeply tied to the history of the canuts. Along with her sister, Madignier joined the anarchist movement in France and the Lyonnese anarchist women's group Marie Ferré-Louise Michel, which was affiliated with the Lyonnese Revolutionary Federation. She also began conducting numerous collections at anarchist meetings to raise funds for social victims.

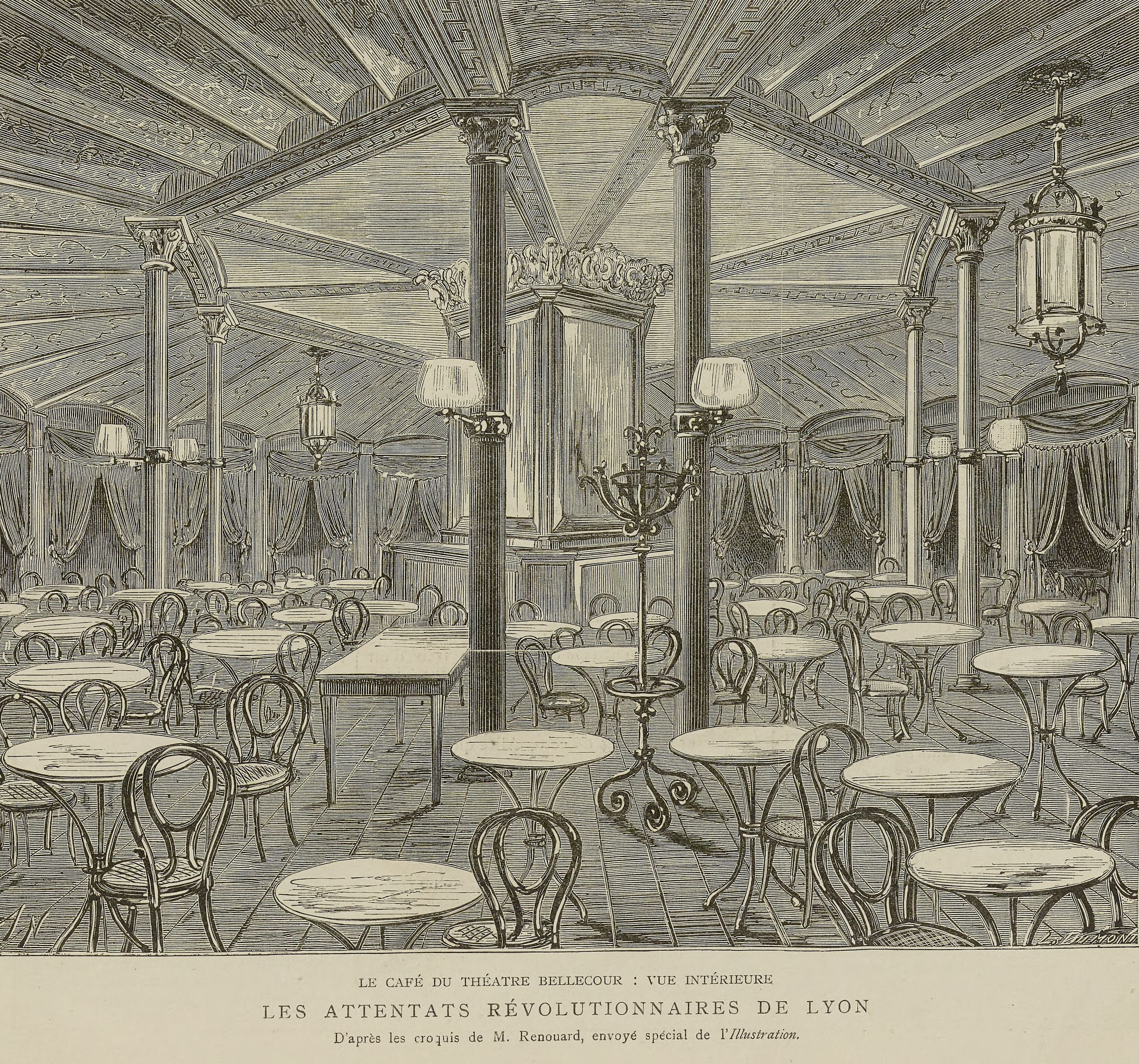
Assommoir bombing (before the explosion) in L'Illustration

In May 1882, the anarchist participated in a meeting of the members of Le Droit social, one of the first anarchist newspapers in France and the first of the Lyon series, to discuss measures to be taken following the ban of the publication and the imprisonment of its manager, François Déjoux. During the meeting, she reportedly declared that the revolutionary women 'swear to lend all [their] support to the valiant citizens who wish to liberate Déjoux'.

One month later, she served as the secretary for a conference held in Lyon by the Lyonnese Revolutionary Federation. The meeting focused on the Revolution and featured several prominent speakers, such as Louise Michel and Émile Digeon, two former Communards who had become anarchists. Two days later, on 3 July 1882, she took part in a meeting with other figures of the Lyonnese anarchist movement, such as Toussaint Bordat. During this meeting, Louise Michel was awarded the title of 'Standard-bearer of the Revolution', and the session concluded with the cries:

Long live the Revolution! Long live the Commune! Death to the thieves! Down with the commissaires! Long live Bordat! Long live Fournier! The Revolution will kill them all!

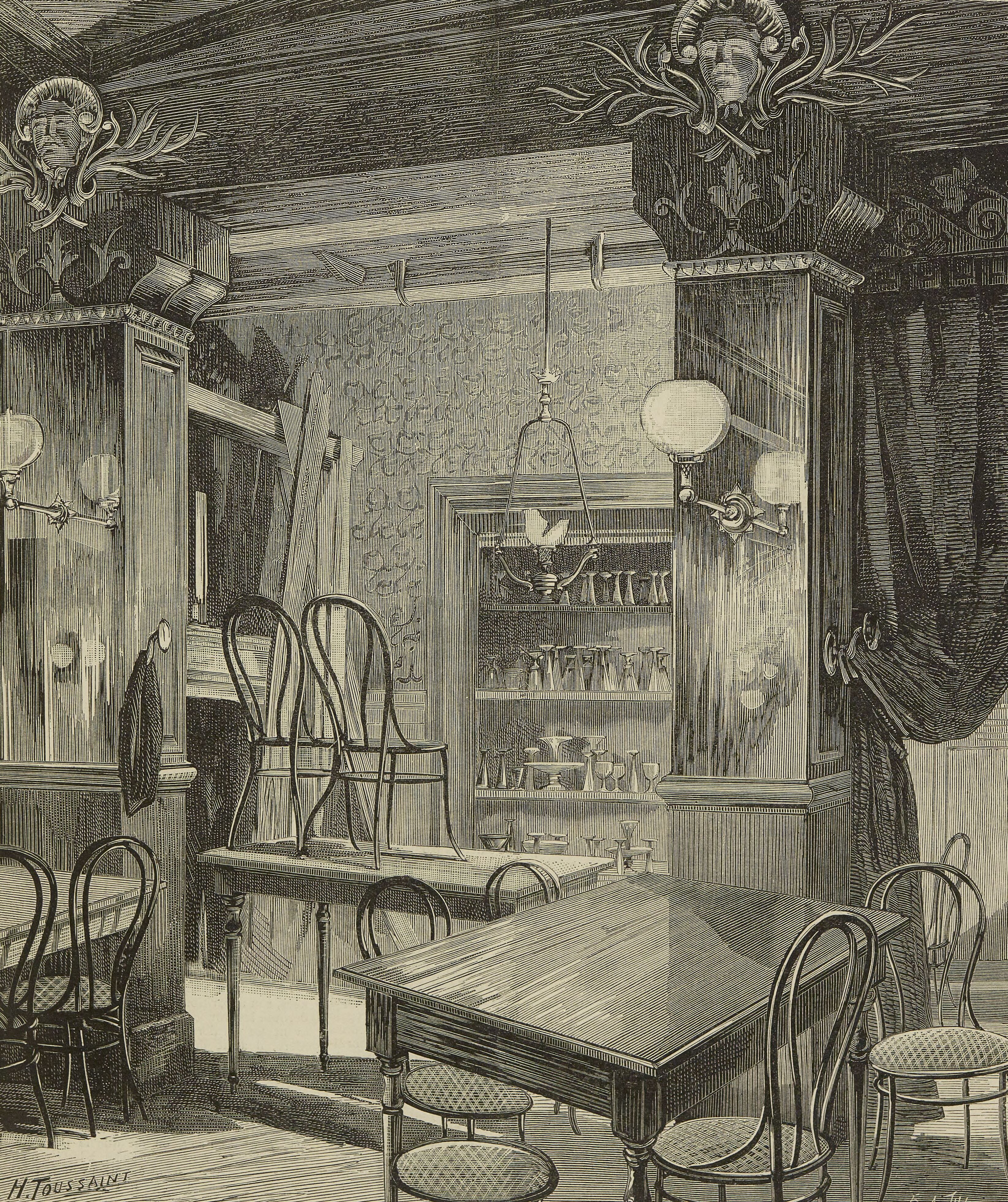
Assommoir bombing (before the explosion) on the front page of L'Illustration

On 16 August 1882, two days after the international meeting in Geneva—where anarchists reportedly advocated for the use of propaganda by the deed—and the same day as the sentencing of companions Claude Crestin and Auguste Bonthoux for some of their writings, she attended a meeting held by the Federation. At this meeting, 'propaganda by the deed was advocated, as that carried out by word and pen resulted only in the condemnation of the companions who engaged in it; the use of daggers, dynamite, and poisoned needles was recommended'.

On 9 September, Madignier represented the Louise Michel-Marie Ferré group and the 'mothers and sisters of the proletarians' in a meeting dedicated to the Montceau-les-Mines troubles. Both black and red flags were displayed during the meeting. Before being applauded by a portion of the 600-strong audience, she declared:

The revolutionary flash that has just struck in Montceau must liberate us all from our exploiters.

On 4 October, several complaints were filed against the anarchist by a commissaire regarding her speeches during that day's meeting; however, they do not appear to have led to any further action. Finally, on 22 October 1882, she took part in her last known meeting, this time alongside Émile Gautier.

=== Assommoir bombing and disappearance ===
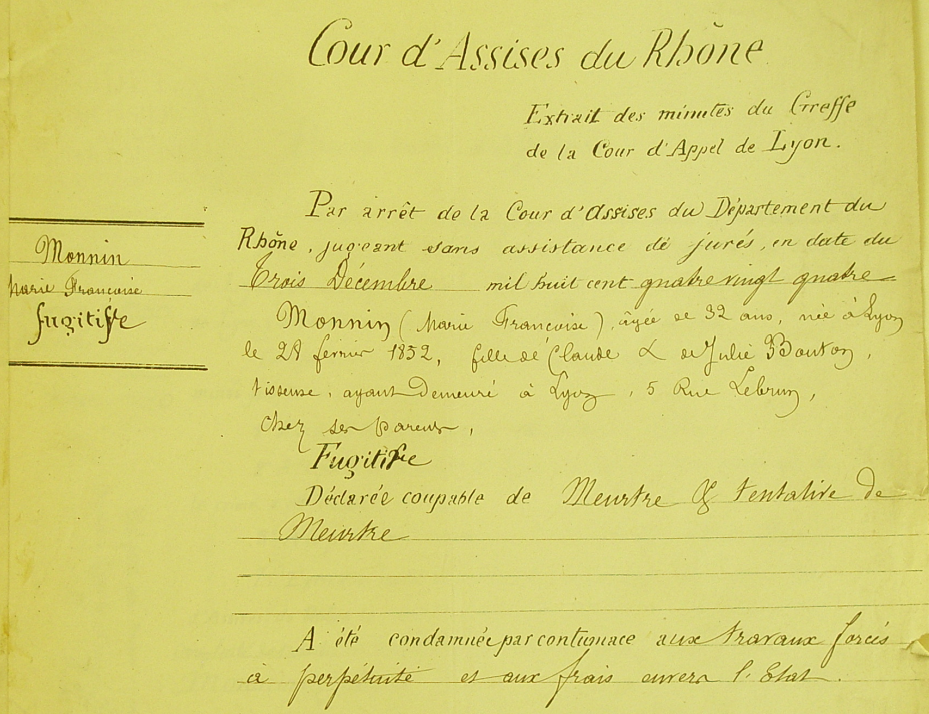
Sentence of Fanny Madignier for the Assommoir bombing (collection of Archives Anarchistes)

During the night of 21–22 October, while the trial of the Black Band was underway, a group of three people went to L'Assommoir, a café-restaurant adjoining the Bellecour Theatre in Lyon, associated with the Lyon bourgeoisie. The group, which according to police reports consisted of two men and one woman, remained in the building for a time before leaving their booth and the premises. 200 people were still inside when three explosions happened in the building.

The attack injured about ten people, four of them seriously. Unlike the attacks by the Black Band or the bombing of the Thiers statue, this attack was lethal: one of the seriously injured victims died four days later.

Meanwhile, Madignier—who was becoming a suspect in the attack as she matched the description of the primary suspect and was summoned to appear before the investigating judge—disappeared, likely fleeing to Switzerland. She reportedly wrote from there five days later, in early November 1882, to request financial aid from her Lyon companions, who allegedly sent her 10 francs.

This remains the last known record of her life. Two years later, in December 1884, Madignier was sentenced in absentia to life imprisonment in a penal colony for the bombing.

== Primary sources ==
=== Trial and police files ===
Collection of the site-archive Archives Anarchistes uploaded to Commons comprising:

- 2 U 464 in the Rhône Archives (43 pages about her and the Assommoir bombing)

== Bibliography ==
- Petit, Dominique (2024), "MADIGNIER Fanny (MONNIN Marie, Françoise, dite Madignier ou Madinier)", Dictionnaire des anarchistes (Le Maitron), Paris: Le Maitron des anarchistes
- Dupuy, Rolf (2025), "MADINIER, Marie [MONNIN, Fany, Marie, Françoise dite]", Dictionnaire international des militants anarchistes, Paris
