= Léon Zitrone =

French journalist (1914–1995)

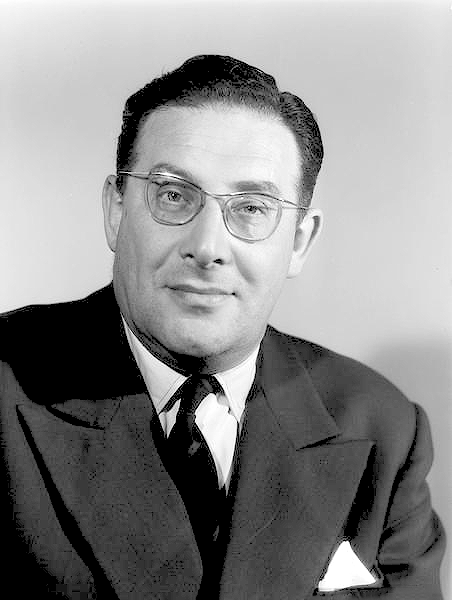
- Zitrone in 1960
- Born: Lev Romanovich Zitron; 25 November 1914; Petrograd, Russian Empire
- Died: 25 November 1995 (aged 81); Paris, France
- Resting place: Levallois-Perret Cemetery, France
- Education: École supérieure de journalisme de Paris
- Occupation: Television journalist
- Spouse: Jacqueline "Laura" Connan (m. 1949)
- Children: 3

Léon Zitrone (born Lev Romanovich Zitron; (Note: Russian: Лев Романович Зитрон. In this name that follows East Slavic naming customs, the patronymic is Romanovich and the family name is Zitron.) 25 November 1914 – 25 November 1995) was a Russian-born French journalist and television presenter.

== Biography ==
Zitrone was born to a Jewish family in Petrograd, Russia. He arrived in France with his family fleeing communism at the age of six. He graduated from the ESJ Paris. He began by training in scientific studies but his mastership of Russian, French, English and German gave him entrance in 1948 to the radio foreign broadcasting services of Radiodiffusion-Télévision Française (RTF). In 1959, he joined the television activity of RTF. From 1961, he became news presenter, a function he occupied for nearly 20 years, first until 1975, on the first French television channel (now TF1), then also on Antenne 2, the other public service channel. Jean-Pierre Elkabbach called him back in 1979. He then took charge of the news program during the weekend (his contract was established until 1 February 1981). He would come back for those news programs also during the Easter and Pentecost weekends.

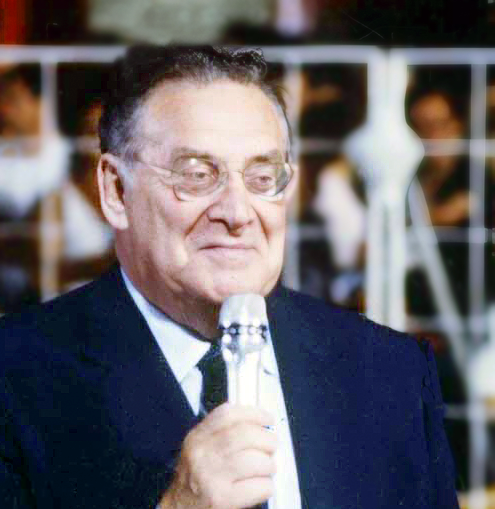
Zitrone hosting Intervilles in 1986

But Léon Zitrone's celebrity is due to the programs he presented or co-presented. He was host of the televised program Intervilles (French counterpart of Britain's It's a Knockout) with Guy Lux. He was a Tour de France commentator six times, and is remembered for his prodigious memory for names of riders. He presented the Olympics 8 times, commented the Eurovision Song Contest on 4 occasions and presented 16 Bastille Day military parades. His notoriety can be attributed to being a key commenter for big events, such as weddings, burials, or investitures of many prominent figures across Europe, some thirty of them during the course of his career.

In 1978, following French singer Marie Myriam's victory the previous year, the Eurovision Song Contest took place in Paris. Léon Zitrone co-presented with Denise Fabre and made the presentation in English. He was the oldest host of the Eurovision Song Contest, aged 63.

In 1984, Zitrone took a leading role in the movie American Dreamer.

== Honors and awards ==
- Knight of the Order of Legion of Honour (1988)
- Médaille militaire

== Death ==
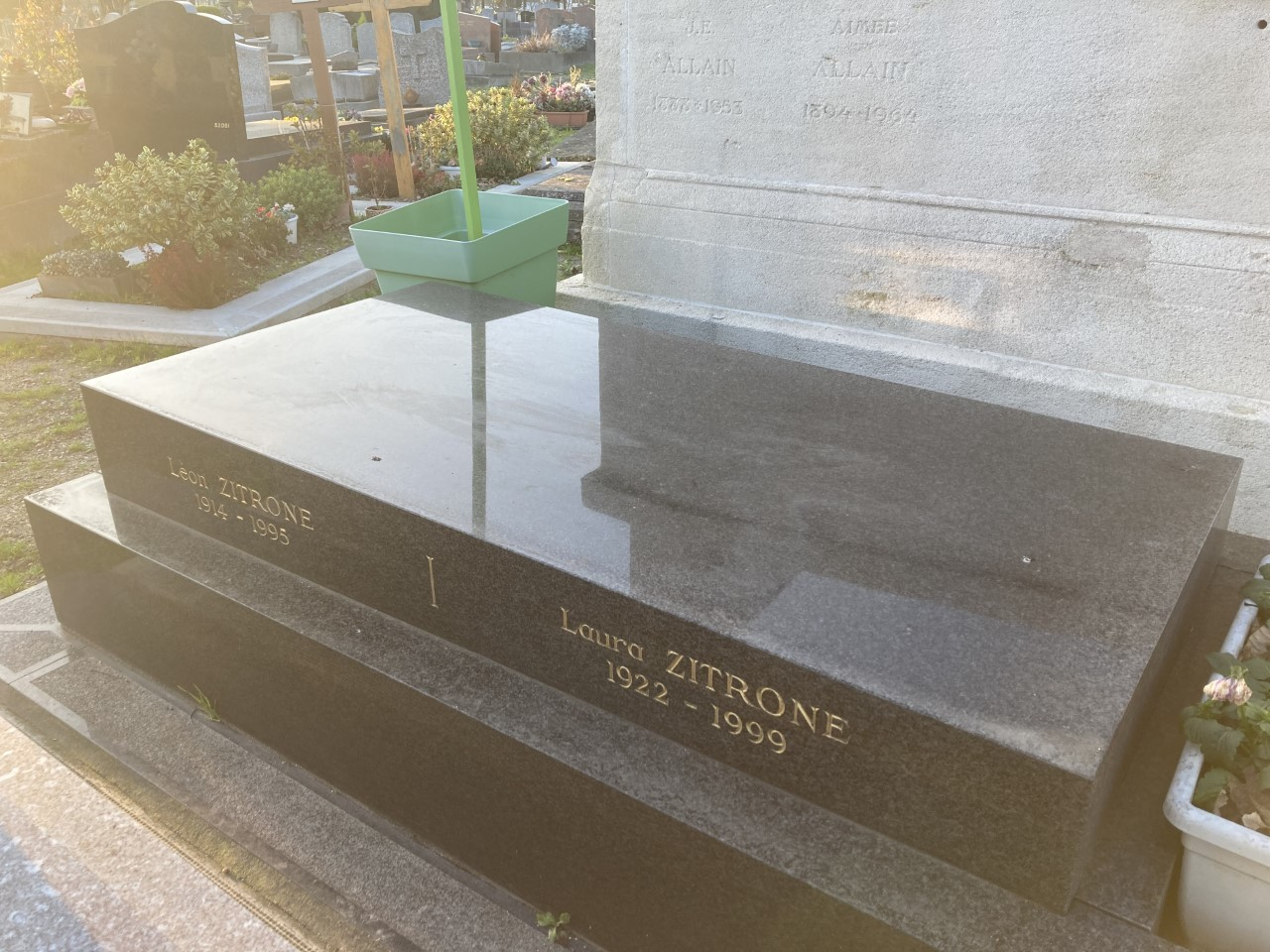
Zitrone's grave

He died from a cerebral hemorrhage on his 81st birthday, 25 November 1995, at the Val-de-Grâce hospital in Paris. He was buried at Levallois-Perret Cemetery.

== Filmography ==
Year	Title	Role	Notes
1959	Rue des prairies	Himself	
1961	Leon Garros ishchet druga	Léon Garros	
1961	Three Faces of Sin	Himself	
1961	The President	Himself	Uncredited
1961	Cocagne	Himself	
1962	The Gentleman from Epsom	Himself	Uncredited
1962	Portrait-robot	Himself	
1963	The Bamboo Stroke		
1963	Méfiez-vous, mesdames	Himself	
1964	Dandelions by the Roots	Himself / Voice commentary	Voice, Uncredited
1965	Operation Double Cross	Himself	
1966	Le caïd de Champignol	Himself	
1966	Un garçon, une fille. Le dix-septième ciel	Himself	Voice, Uncredited
1967	Live for Life	Le présentateur télé	
1968	Pasha	Himself / Horse racing commentary	Uncredited
1968	Ho!	Himself / En personne	Uncredited
1969	Les gros malins		
1969	Trois hommes sur un cheval	Horse racing enthusiast	Uncredited
1971	Macédoine	Himself	Uncredited
1972	Les intrus	Journalist	
1974	Mariage	Himself	
1975	Bons Baisers de Hong Kong	French spy	
1976	L'Année sainte	TV actor	Voice, Uncredited
1977	Drôles de zèbres	Horse racing commentary	
1978	Et vive la liberté!	Himself	
1980	The Umbrella Coup	Commentary	Voice
1980	La Boum	Himself	
1982	Deux heures moins le quart avant Jésus-Christ		
1983	Les Mots pour le dire	TV presenter	Uncredited
1984	American Dreamer	Ivan Stranauvlitch	
1985	Le mariage du siècle	Commentary	Voice

== See also ==
- List of Eurovision Song Contest presenters
- Le Gentleman d'Epsom (film, 1962)

== Notes ==
Preceded by (United Kingdom) Angela Rippon	Eurovision Song Contest presenter (with Denise Fabre); 1978	Succeeded by (Israel) Daniel Pe'er and Yardena Arazi
