= Levallois-Perret Cemetery =

Cemetery in the commune of Levallois-Perret in Paris, France

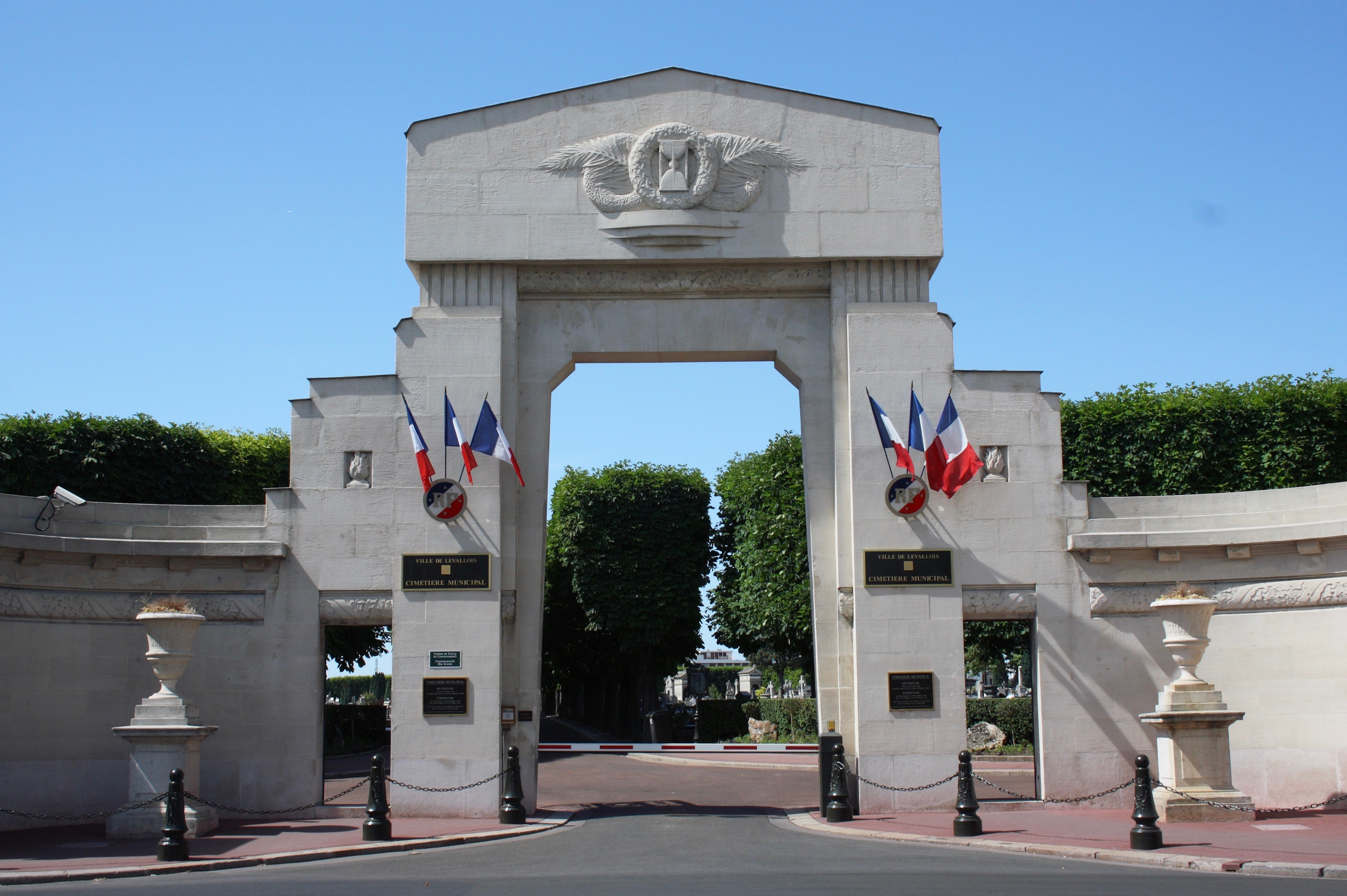
- Entrance of Levallois-Perret Cemetery
- Interactive map of Levallois-Perret Cemetery

Details
- Established: 1868
- Location: Levallois-Perret
- Country: France
- Coordinates: 48.900°N 2.289°E
- Type: Communal
- Owned by: Municipality
- Size: 7.5 hectares (19 acres)

The Levallois-Perret Cemetery (French: Cimetière de Levallois-Perret, also known simply as Cimetière de Levallois) is a cemetery in the commune of Levallois-Perret in the northwestern suburbs of Paris, France. Strictly speaking it is just outside Paris in the arrondissement of Nanterre, in the Hauts-de-Seine department, in the Île-de-France region.

The cemetery was subject of the Michèle Bernard song Au Cimetière de Levallois (which remembers Louise Michel, who is buried here).

== History ==
The cemetery was opened in 1868, in the then newly formed suburb of Levallois-Perret. According to the CWGC the cemetery was used by The Hertford British Hospital Charity (a charity founded by Richard Wallace and which after a merger in 2008 became Institut Hospitalier Franco-Britannique).

The cemetery was enlarged in 1884 and in 1910. The entrance and offices were constructed around 1935.

== Notable burials ==
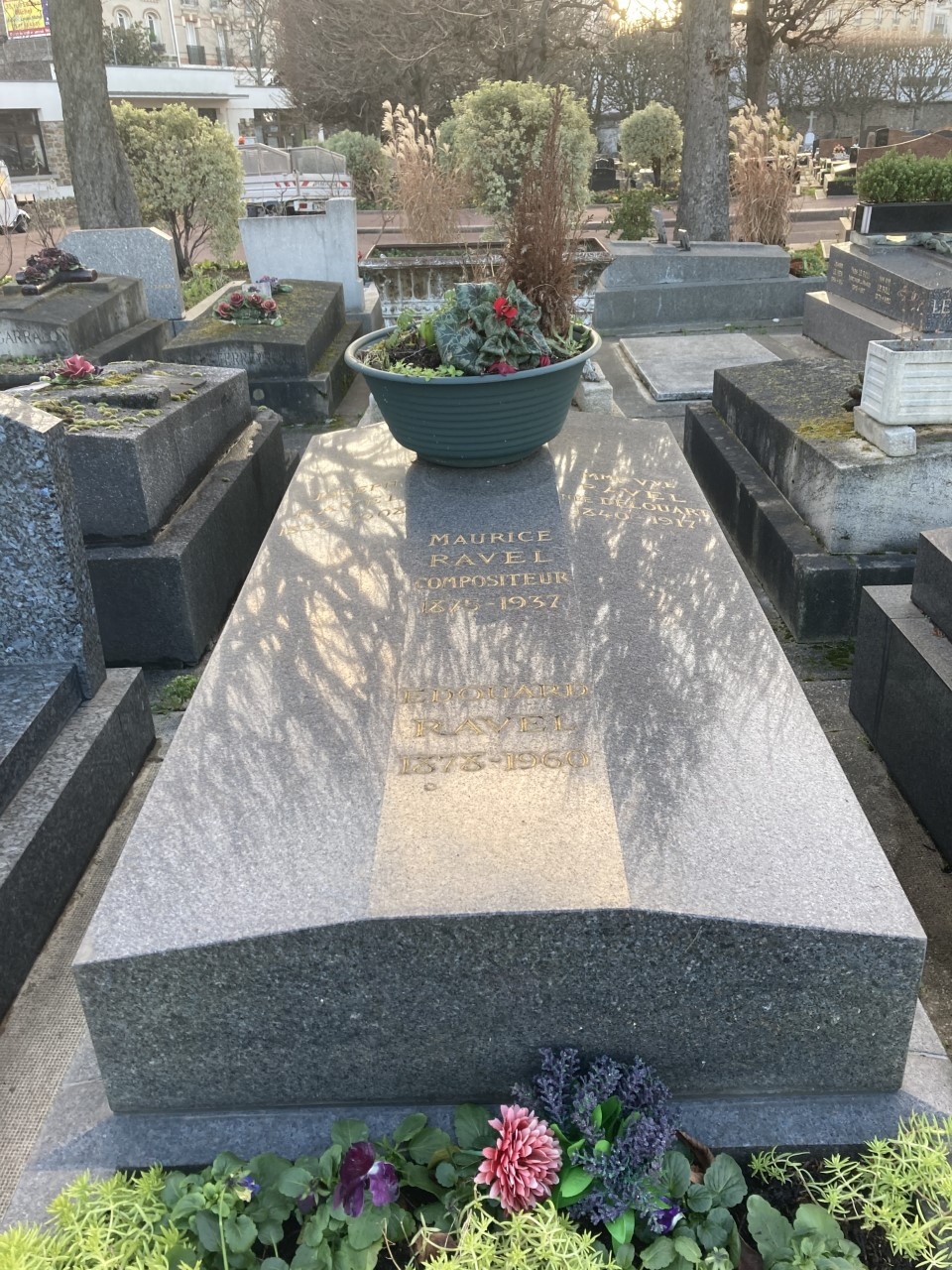
Maurice Ravel's grave.

It is estimated that the cemetery contains more than 27.000 tombs. Many local dignitaries are buried here. The commune maintains some of the tombs.

Amongst others, this cemetery is the last resting place of Gustave Eiffel (in the family grave), Maurice Ravel (in the family grave) and Léon Zitrone as well as communards Théophile Ferré and Louise Michel.

In division 25 there is a Carré Militaire, dedicated to those fallen for France. In division 34 there are 29 British Commonwealth personnel graves from World War I, maintained by the CWGC. There is also a large War Memorial (by Bertin and Yroudy) erected in 1923 and a monument to taxi drivers (les cochers-chauffeurs) erected in 1948 (division 22).

Nicolas Levallois (1816–1879), the first mayor of the suburb, is buried here.

Others include Eugène Bigot, France Dhélia, Guy Grosso and Maryse Hilsz.

== Location ==
The entrance of the cemetery is located on Rue Baudin near the junction with Rue Raspail. It is located next to the railway. The cemetery is divided into 43 divisions. There are good views of Paris in the distance.

== Public transport ==
The cemetery is a short walk from Anatole France station and Pont de Levallois–Bécon station on Paris Métro Line 3. The nearest railway station is Clichy–Levallois station, which is serviced by Transilien Line L.

The cemetery is also served by bus lines 54, 93, 94, 163, 164, 165, 167, 174, 238, 274 and 275

There is a Vélib' station at Rue du Professeur René Leriche (21111).

== Gallery ==
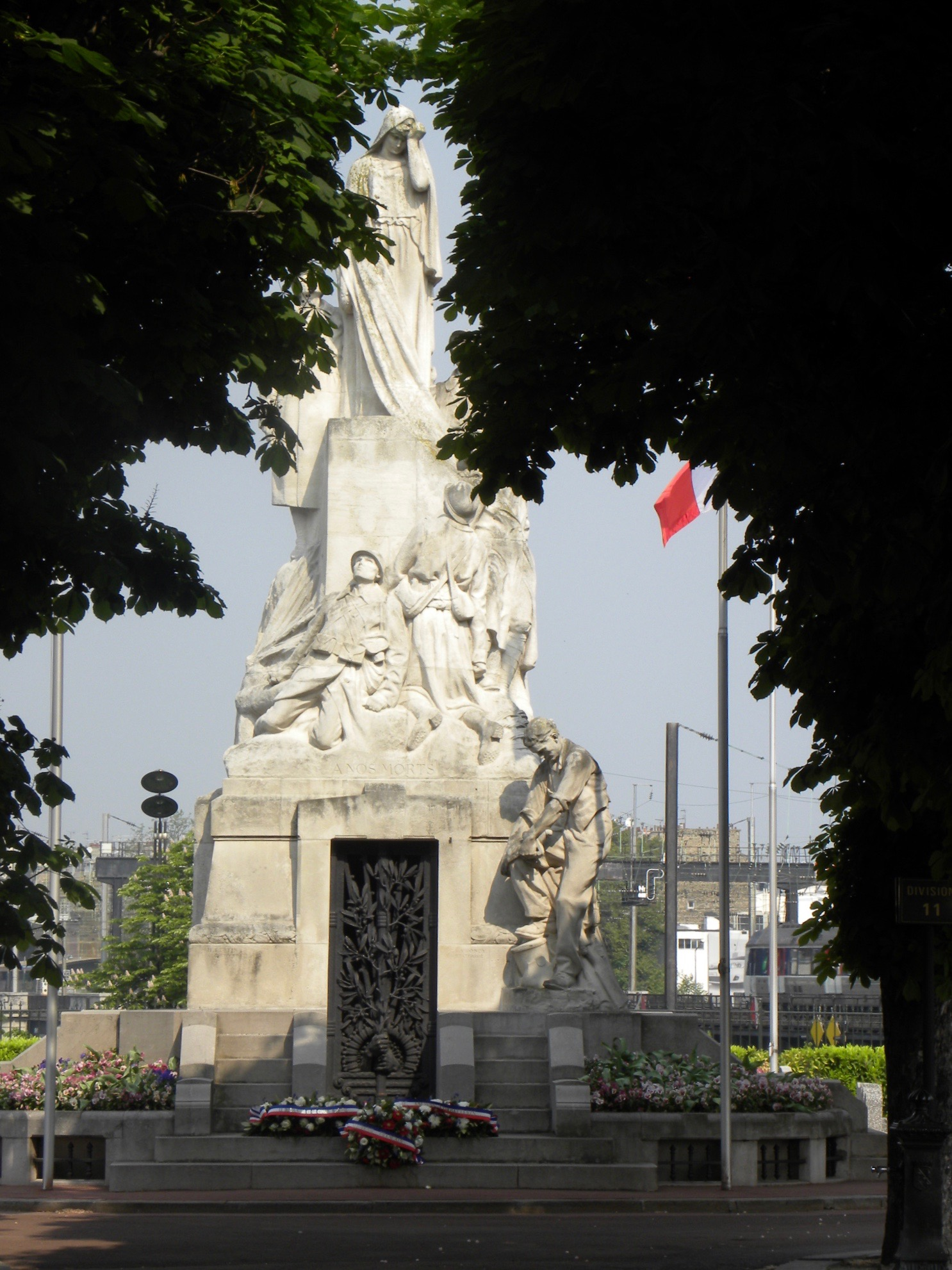
World War I Monument

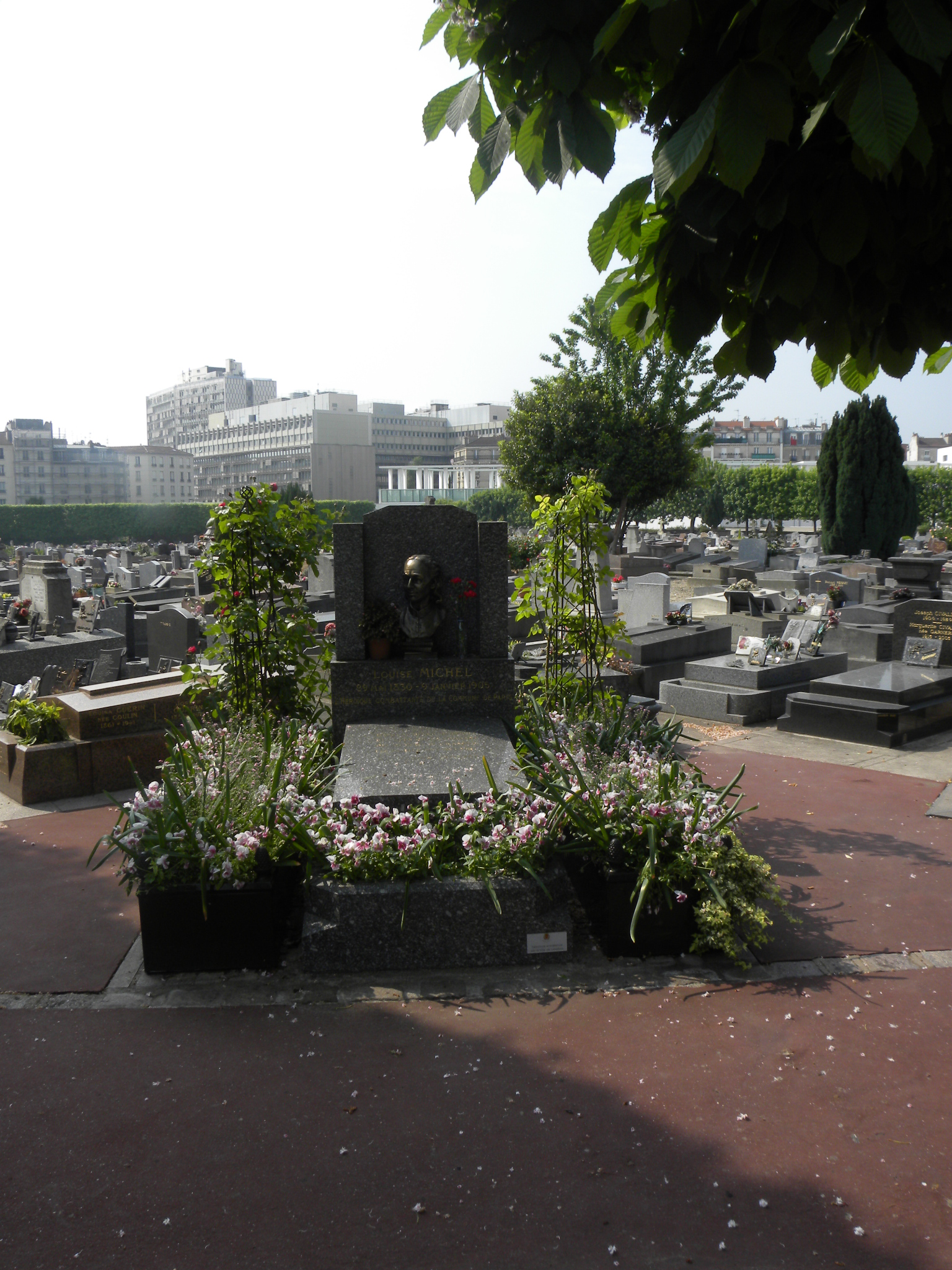
Grave of Louise Michel

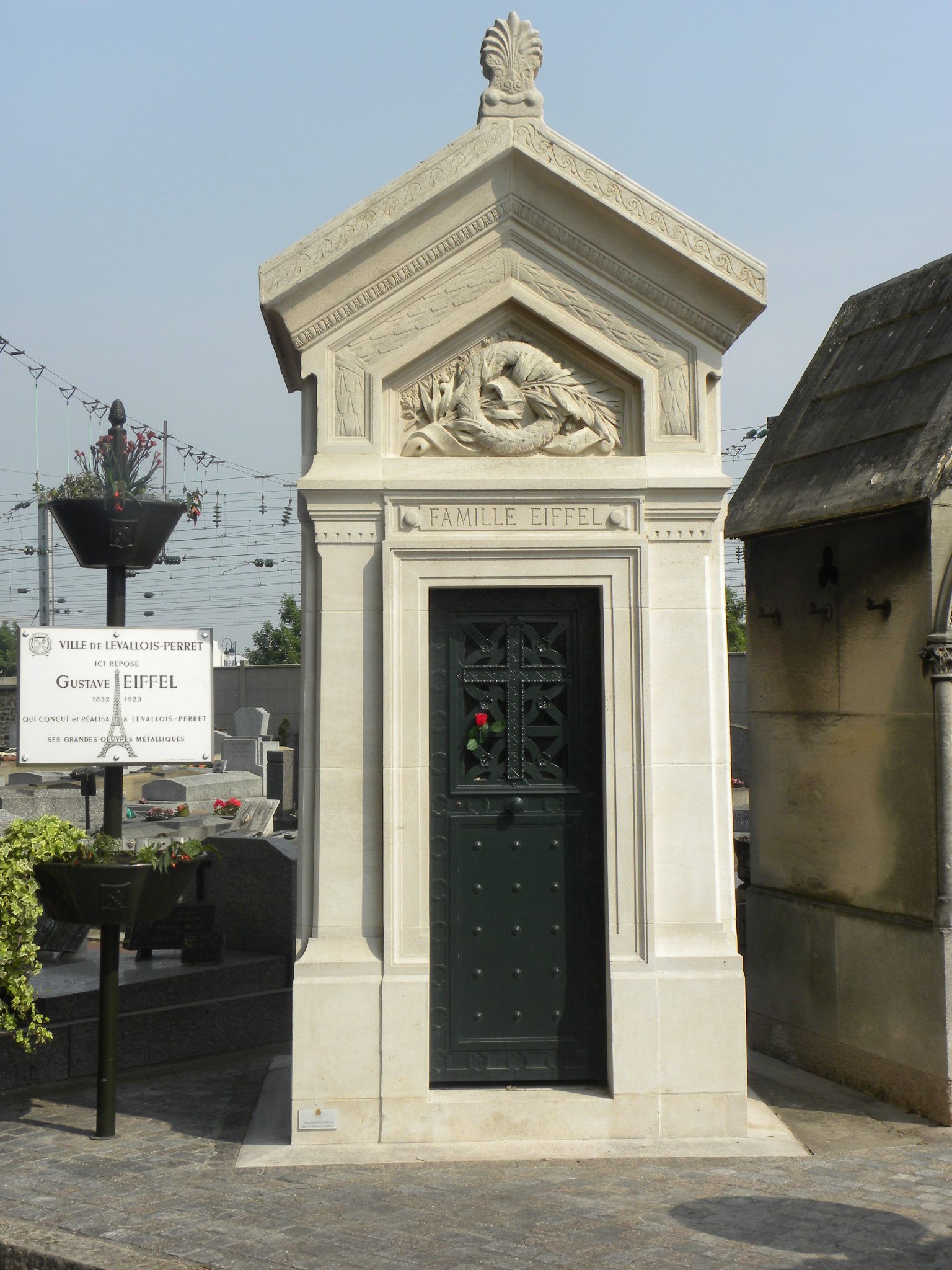
Eiffel family grave

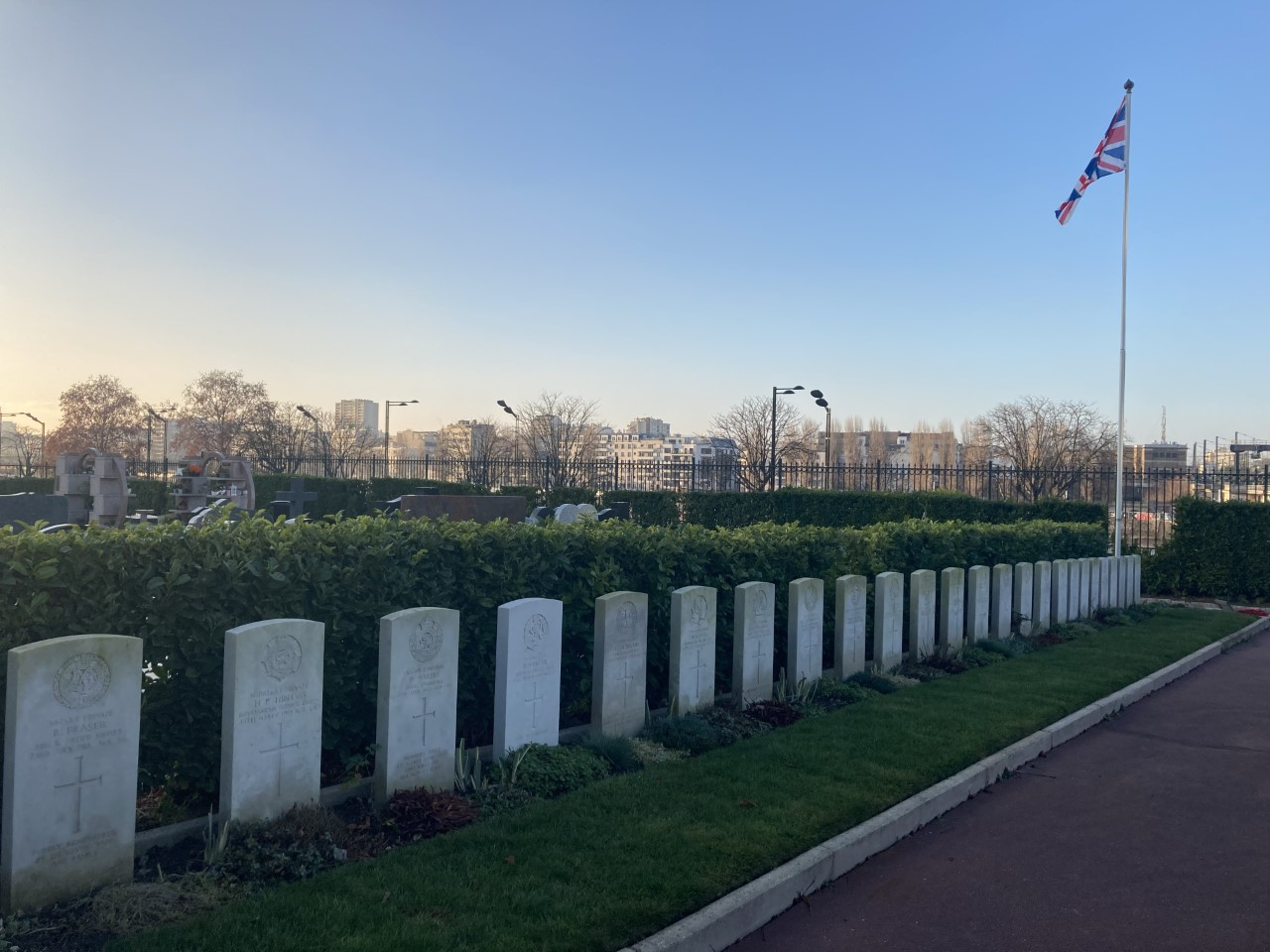
Graves maintained by the Commonwealth War Graves Commission
