= Assommoir bombing =

1882 anarchist attack in Lyon, France

- Part of Propaganda of the deed
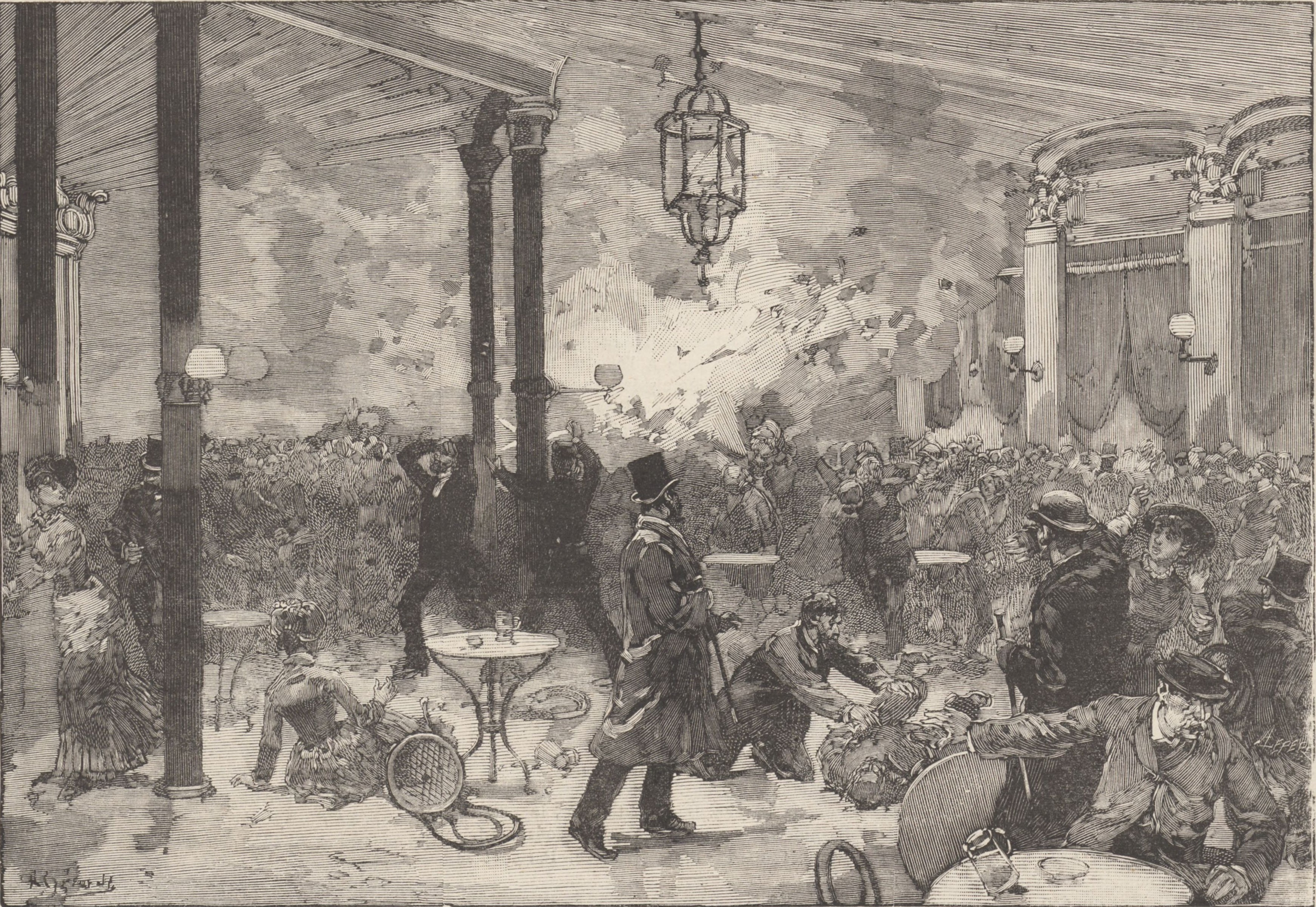
- Romanced depiction of the attack in Le Monde illustré (11 November 1882)
- Location: 45°45′30″N 4°50′04″E; Assommoir restaurant next to the Bellecour Theatre
- Date: 23 October 1882 around 2 A.M.
- Attack type: bombing
- Deaths: 1
- Injuries: 10
- Perpetrators: Fanny Madignier; At least 2 other anarchists Louise Michel-Marie Ferré group (?)
- Motive: Anarchism
- Accused: 2
- Verdict: Guilty (deportation)
- Convicted: 1

The Assommoir bombing was a bomb attack carried out on 23 October 1882 around 2:00 A.M. by anarchist Fanny Madignier, a member of the Louise Michel-Marie Ferré group, and at least two accomplices against L'Assommoir, a restaurant associated with the Lyonnese bourgeoisie. This was the first deadly anarchist attack in French history, although the intent to kill is unclear.

Since the 1870s and even more from the Black Band insurrection in August 1882 onwards, the Lyonnese anarchist movement faced significant repression, leading to increased conflict with the French state. At the time, Lyon was a major stronghold for the movement, to the extent that it could be considered one of the 'capitals' of the anarchist movement.

On the morning of 23 October 1882, the day after the opening of the Black Band trial, a group consisting of three companions, including two men and one woman, entered the establishment, which remained open all night. The group sat down and ordered food and drinks totaling 5 francs. Around 2:00 A.M., while 200 people were still on the premises, the woman—presumably Madignier—closed the curtain surrounding the booth where the group was seated. Meanwhile, her two accomplices lit the fuses of three bombs: two small-caliber devices and one much more powerful device intended to explode later. They threw them under the table before quickly fleeing the scene. The two small bombs exploded, leading the restaurant owner to believe there was a gas leak. He cut off the gas supply, plunging the underground room into total darkness, save for the flames beginning to catch on the booth's curtains from the initial blasts.

As the crowd rushed toward the exit due to the small explosions and the darkness, a few customers, including a man named Miodre, moved toward the booth where the third, more powerful bomb had not yet detonated. Unaware of the danger, Miodre attempted to stomp out the fire and stepped on the device, triggering it prematurely. This explosion, significantly larger than the previous two—which may have been intended to frighten the crowd and push it towards the outside—destroyed part of the building and injured those near the epicenter, including the owner and Miodre, whose leg was pulverized. About ten others were also injured. Miodre died from his wounds a few days later.

The attack shocked Lyon's upper classes and led to continued repression against anarchists, culminating months later in the Trial of the 66 in January 1883. Extensive raids were carried out against Lyonnese anarchists. Antoine Cyvoct, manager of the anarchist newspaper L'Étendard révolutionnaire, was accused by authorities of committing the attack. He was acquitted of the bombing itself but was nonetheless sentenced to death for allegedly writing a newspaper article against the restaurant eight months prior. Madignier, however, managed to escape and disappear. She was sentenced to life in a penal colony in absentia, but French authorities were never able to find her.

== History ==
=== General context ===
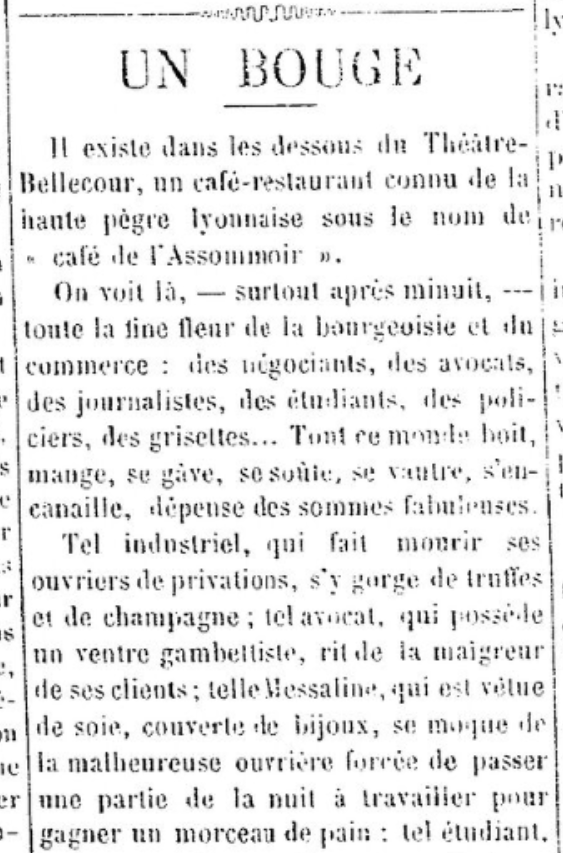
Parts of the article used against Cyvoct to sentence him to death after the bombing

In the late 1870s, anarchists developed the strategy of propaganda by the deed. This approach aimed to transmit anarchist ideas directly through action rather than discourse, with the goal of sparking a revolution by inciting the people to revolt. This included launching uprisings or assassinating prominent political and financial figures. This strategy emerged within a highly repressive environment; in France, the Dufaure Law of 1872 effectively banned anarchist organizations such as the Anti-authoritarian International. For instance, accepting a position within this organization was punishable by five years in prison for a French citizen.

Lyon and the surrounding region quickly became a major hub for the anarchist movement. Anarchists there formed the Lyonnese Revolutionary Federation, which remained somewhat informal and semi-clandestine due to the French authorities' ban on the Anti-authoritarian International. Consequently, Lyonnese anarchists operated in a climate of constant repression and surveillance by the French state.

Despite the repression, their numbers grew steadily in the city, to the point that Lyon could be described as one of the 'capitals' of the anarchist movement during this period.

=== Premices ===
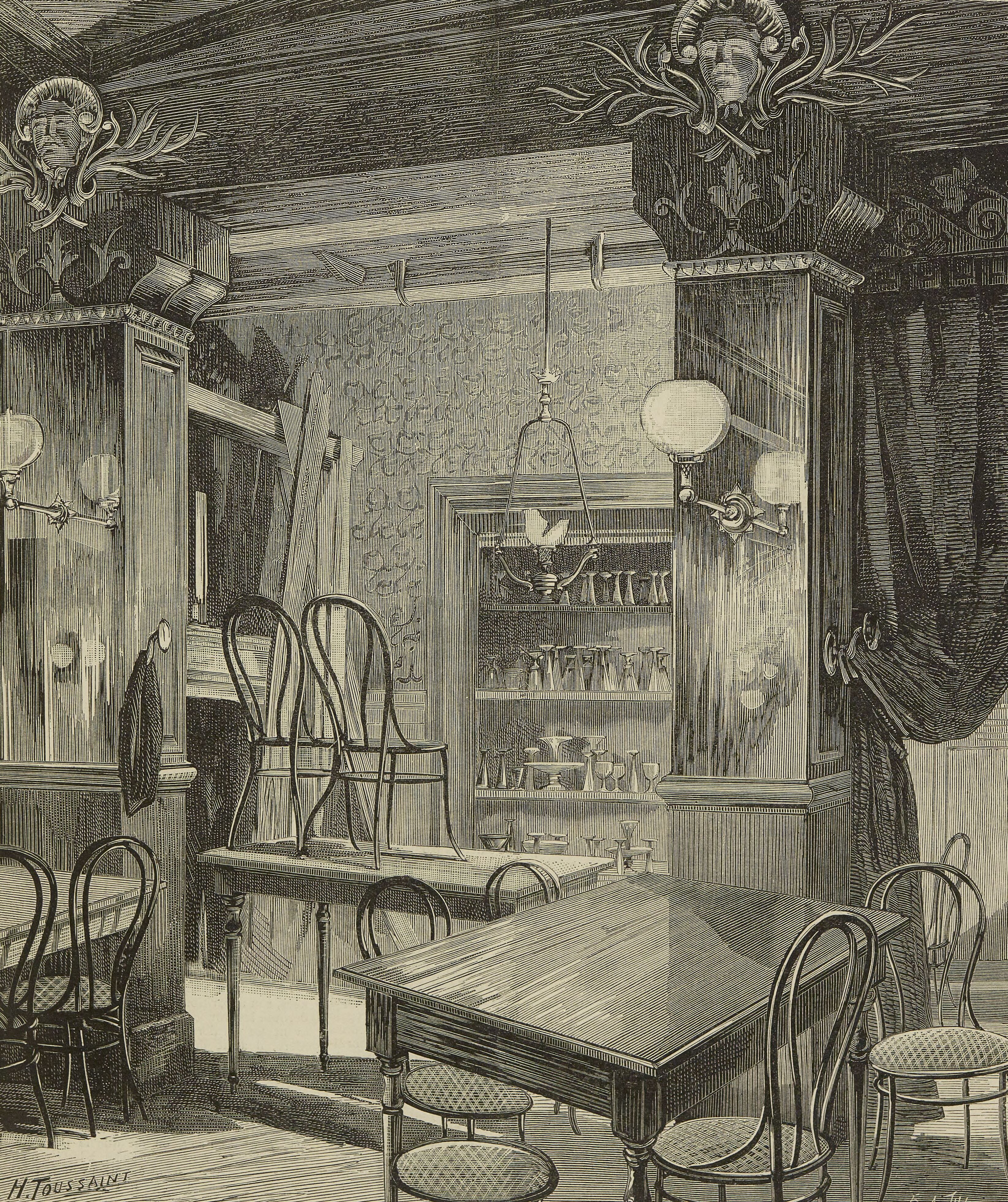
Assommoir bombing in front page of L'Illustration (before the explosion)

In August 1882, the Geneva International gathering took place on 13 August 1882 and 14 August 1882. According to police reports, the anarchist delegates included numerous individuals from Lyon—such as Toussaint Bordat, François Déjoux, and the Trenta brothers—who reportedly advocated for the use of propaganda by the deed. The following day, the Black Band—an anarchist organization of miners from Saône-et-Loire—commenced its activities. They looted an armory, armed the miners, and launched an insurrection. This campaign involved non-lethal bombings targeting the Catholic Church, the interests of mining capitalists, and police informants, events which became known as the Montceau-les-Mines troubles.

As several suspected members of the Black Band were arrested, the situation in Lyon became increasingly volatile. This escalation was noted by local police authorities, who stated in a contemporary report:

It is indisputable that for the past six months, Anarchist groups have gained significantly, not only numerically but also in terms of revolutionary propaganda and action. This party [...] is becoming increasingly aggressive and daring. In my opinion, this party—which is organizing, developing, and expanding every day, and whose destructive and incendiary theories are finding supporters even in simple villages [...] could become, at any given moment, excessively dangerous, especially in large cities like Lyon.

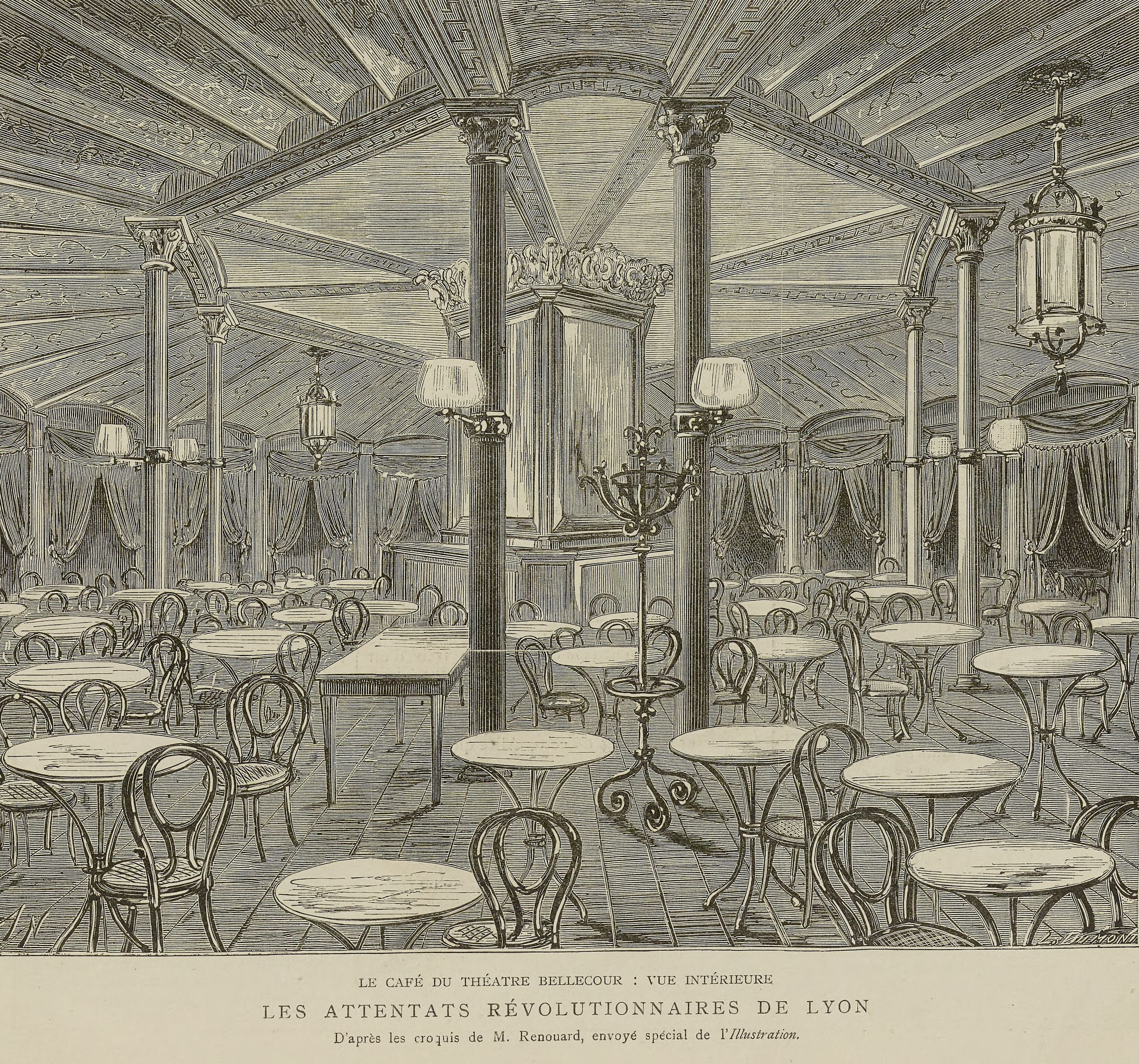
Assommoir bombing in L'Illustration (before the explosion)

Furthermore, the city was suffering from widespread famine during this period; children were forced to go to military barracks to beg soldiers for bread for their families. Starting in August 1882, the anarchist movement in Lyon faced heavy repression. On 16 August 1882, companions Claude Crestin and Auguste Bonthoux were convicted for their writings. This led to a meeting of the Lyonnese Revolutionary Federation, where it was argued that propaganda by the deed should be prioritized, as spoken and written propaganda only resulted in the imprisonment of companions. The use of daggers, dynamite, and poisoned needles was recommended instead. On 19 August 1882, the Federation's newspaper, L'Étendard révolutionnaire, was raided by authorities due to its alleged links to the Black Band.

=== Assommoir bombing ===
In September and October 1882, the trial of the suspected members of the Black Band opened in Chalon-sur-Saône before being moved to Riom. During the night of 22 October 1882 to 23 October 1882, a group of three companions—one woman and two men—went to the L'Assommoir restaurant in Lyon. The establishment was associated with the city's bourgeoisie and was adjacent to the Bellecour Theatre; the restaurant was divided into several sections, including a basement level that remained open all night.

At approximately 1:30 A.M., the group ordered some wine, sauerkraut, and a piece of cheese, totaling 5 francs.

Around 2:00 A.M., the three individuals seated in booth number 2, located next to the owner, went to settle their bill. They then returned to their booth; the woman closed the curtain of the booth while the other two lit the fuses of bombs—small lead balls containing dynamite—before quickly fleeing the premises and throwing the devices under their table. Approximately two hundred people were gathered in the building at that moment. Two small initial explosions occurred moments later, causing more fear than physical harm but sparking a panic that pushed the crowd toward the exits.

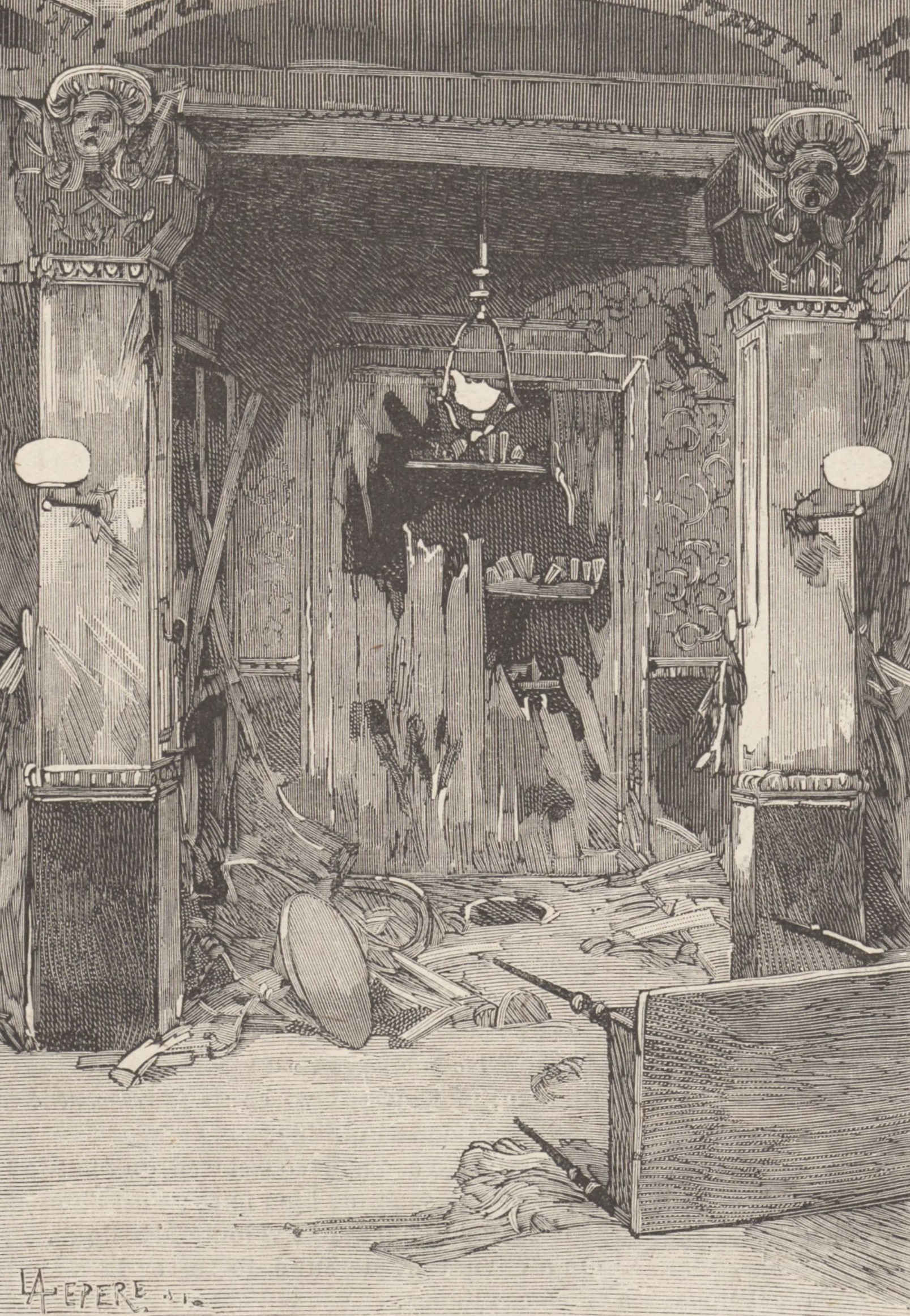
Exploded booth where the bombs were situated in Le Monde illustré

However, the establishment's owner, named Kœmgen, believed the explosions were caused by a ruptured gas pipe and subsequently shut off the gas. This decision intensified the panic, as cutting the gas plunged the room into total darkness. Some customers, such as the theater actor Bouvard, believed a fire had started upon seeing flames breaking out on the curtains of booth number 2—the only visible light in the dark. He rushed toward the flames to extinguish them.

At the same time, Miodre, a commercial employee who was also running toward the source of the detonations, attempted to stomp out the third and final bomb with his foot, thinking he was putting out the fire. The device exploded as soon as he stepped on it, causing a detonation far more powerful than the previous two. Approximately ten people were injured, four of them seriously. These included Miodre, whose right leg was pulverized, the owner—who was near the booth—and Bouvard. The casualties were primarily among those who had approached the area where the bombs had been placed.

The panic intensified as soon as this final explosion rang out; the screams and cries of those who were hit, terrified, or caught in the crush could be heard throughout the building. This was, however, the third and last explosion. Firefighters arrived shortly after, successfully extracting the wounded and extinguishing the emerging fires.

=== Human toll and victims ===
In total, 10 people were injured (5% of the total present), 4 of whom were seriously hurt (2% of the total), and there was 1 fatality (0.5%), as Miodre died from his injuries a few days later.

=== Potential parallel unrest ===
On the same day, unknown assailants threw dynamite cartridges in front of the prefecture in Montpellier, though there were no casualties. The following day, the Vitriolerie bombing occurred, targeting an army recruitment building; this attack also resulted in no victims. Meanwhile, the trade unions of joiners, cabinetmakers, and carpenters in the Île-de-France—organizations composed of a large number of anarchists—went on strike. These same unions would later call for the major demonstration of 9 March 1883 a few months later.

=== Judicial aftermath and new wave of repression on the anarchist movement in France ===
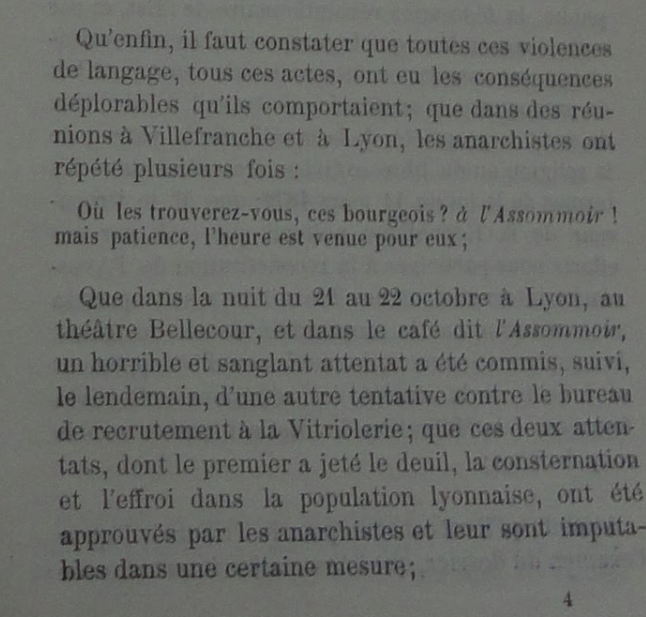
Part of the trial of the 66 mentioning the Assommoir bombing (collections of Archives Anarchistes)

The attack caused a profound shock among the wealthy population of Lyon. The repression of anarchists intensified further; while authorities searched for Fanny Madignier—one of the primary suspects who vanished immediately after being summoned by the investigating judge a few days later and was never found—they arrested a large number of Lyonnese anarchists. Among them was the manager of their press organ, Antoine Cyvoct.

With Madignier nowhere to be found, the French authorities accused Cyvoct of being the individual primarily responsible for the bombing. They claimed he had specifically targeted the restaurant in an article and was present in Lyon at the time of the event. Cyvoct denied these allegations—even after his release fourteen years later—maintaining that he was in Switzerland at the time, not Lyon, and that he was not the author of the incriminating article. He was tried and acquitted of direct participation in the bombing but was nonetheless sentenced to death for the article published in the newspaper. Madignier, for her part, was convicted for the attack and sentenced to life in a penal colony in absentia; she was never captured.

In parallel, the Trial of the 66 in early 1883 served as the pinnacle of this period of intense repression against the anarchist movement in France.

== Bibliography ==
- Chambost, Anne-Sophie (2017), "« Nous ferons de notre pire… ». Anarchie, illégalisme … et lois scélérates" [«We’ll Do our Worse». Anarchy, Illegalism … and Evil Law], Droit et Cultures (in French), 74 (2): 65–87, doi:10.4000/droitcultures.4264
- Eisenzweig, Uri (2001). Fictions de l'anarchisme [Fictions of anarchism] (in French). France: C. Bourgois. ISBN 2-267-01570-6.
- Petit, Dominique (2024), "MADIGNIER Fanny (MONNIN Marie, Françoise, dite Madignier ou Madinier)", Dictionnaire des anarchistes (Le Maitron), Paris: Le Maitron des anarchistes
