= Marie Ferré =

French activist (1845–1882)

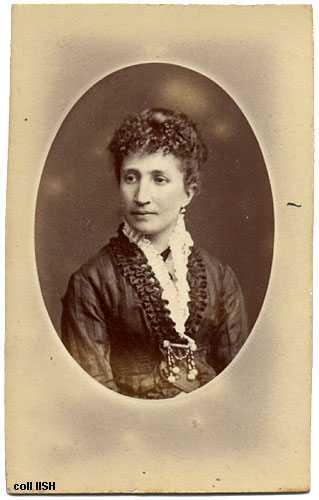
- Ferré (c. 1871)
- Born: 30 April 1845; 1st arrondissement of Paris, France
- Died: 24 February 1882 (aged 36); 9th arrondissement of Paris, France
- Parents: Laurent Ferré (father); Marie Rivière (mother)
- Relatives: Hippolyte Ferré (brother); Théophile Ferré (brother)

Marie Ferré (1845–1882) was a French activist involved in the Paris Commune.

== Biography ==
Marie Ferré was born in the 1st arrondissement of Paris on 30 April 1845, the daughter of Laurent Ferré and Marie Rivière; and the elder sister of Hippolyte and Théophile Ferré.

Her brothers were participants in the Paris Commune of 1871. During the suppression of the Commune, the French authorities searched the Ferré home in Levallois-Perret, looking for Théophile. They instead found Marie Ferré, in bed and very ill, being cared for by her mother. When they threatened to arrest Marie, which could have killed her, her mother gave up Théophile's location at rue Saint-Saveur. He was arrested and later executed. After a week in police custody, Marie Ferré was released, while her mother was committed to a mental asylum, where she died. Laurent Ferré was imprisoned in Fouras and Hippolyte was imprisoned in Versailles.

With her entire family dead or interned, Ferré dedicated herself to helping revolutionary prisoners, working both days and nights in order to send money to imprisoned Communards. She later went into exile in London, where she became more popular among French exiles than her friend Louise Michel. When Michel was deported to New Caledonia, Ferré cared for Michel's mother. After a political amnesty was proclaimed, in November 1880, Ferré and Camille Bias greeted Michel at Gare Saint-Lazare upon her return from exile. In July 1881, Ferré and Michel organised the re-burial of Théophile's remains in the Levallois-Perret Cemetery; and in January 1882, they participated in a demonstration on the first anniversary of Louis Auguste Blanqui's death. Michel was arrested, and Marie Ferré fell ill.

Sick with cardiovascular disease, Marie Ferré died in the 9th arrondissement of Paris on 24 February 1882. Her body was covered with Louise Michel's red shawl and buried on 26 February in the Levallois-Perret Cemetery, alongside her brother Théophile and their mother. Her funeral was attended by 1,500 people, including her father Laurent, brother Hippolyte, and her friends Louise Michel and Camille Bias, who together led the funeral procession. In an obituary published the following month in Le Droit social, she was remembered as "a firmly convinced, energetic and devoted revolutionary [who] was always to be found in the front row during a demonstration or revolutionary movement". Louise Michel's revolutionary group was renamed in honour of Ferré.

== Bibliography ==
- Audin, Michèle (10 June 2017). "Vie et mort de Marie Ferré". La commune de Paris (in French).
- Bullard, Alice (2000). "Cleansing Paris of Le Peuple". Exile to Paradise: Savagery and Civilization in Paris and the South Pacific, 1790-1900. Stanford University Press. pp. 67–97. ISBN 0-8047-3878-5. LCCN 00-055640.
- Poulain-Argiolas, Renaud (15 April 2021). "FERRÉ Marie, Françoise". Le Maitron (in French).
