= Blanzy =

- Commune
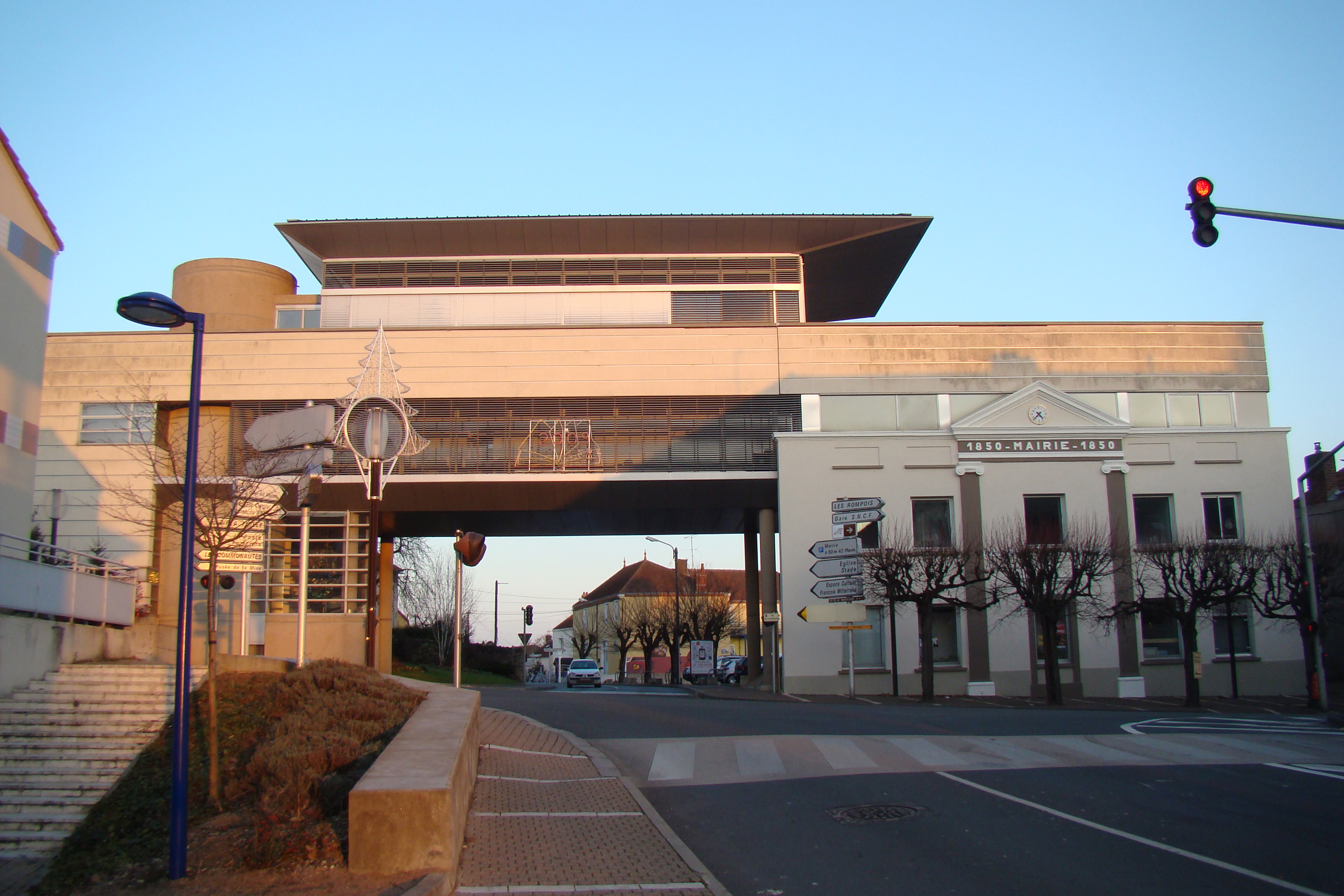
- Town hall

- Coat of arms
- Location of Blanzy
- Location within France Location within Bourgogne-Franche-Comté
- Coordinates: 46°42′17″N 4°23′28″E
- Country: France
- Region: Bourgogne-Franche-Comté
- Department: Saône-et-Loire
- Arrondissement: Autun
- Canton: Blanzy
- Intercommunality: CU Creusot Montceau

Government
  - Mayor (2020–2026): Hervé Mazurek
- Area^{1}: 39.95 km^{2} (15.42 sq mi)
- Highest elevation: 399 m (1,309 ft)
- Lowest elevation: 277 m (909 ft)
- Population (2023): 5,955
  - Density: 149.1/km^{2} (386.1/sq mi)
- Time zone: UTC+01:00 (CET)
  - Summer (DST): UTC+02:00 (CEST)
- INSEE/Postal code: 71040 /71450
- ^{1} French Land Register data, which excludes lakes, ponds, glaciers > 1 km^{2} (0.386 sq mi or 247 acres) and river estuaries.

Blanzy (French pronunciation: [blɑ̃zi]) is a commune in the Saône-et-Loire department in the region of Bourgogne-Franche-Comté in eastern France.

The area covered by Blanzy has been inhabited since prehistory, but remained sparsely populated until the 19th century, when the mining of the resources in the Saône-et-Loire coal basin took on new importance and became industrialized—notably through the founding of the neighboring commune of Montceau-les-Mines in 1856.

Deeply linked to the fate of its mines, it saw a significant number of miners join the town to find employment. For a good part of the 19th century, the town was politically, religiously, and economically controlled by the Chagot family, owners of the Blanzy Mining Company who strongly promoted Catholicism, relying notably on the clergy to monitor the miners. It is estimated that between the 1850s and the period of the troubles, about twenty years, more than 400 adult and children miners died in the mine.

This situation ended during the Montceau-les-Mines troubles (1878-1885), when the miners of the town and region joined anarchism in large numbers, making the mining basin a center of anarchism in France, particularly through the Black Band, one or more secret anarchist organizations of miners operating in the region and carrying out numerous attacks.

Following the closure of the mines throughout the 20th century, the town has diversified economically.

== Geography ==
The Bourbince forms part of the commune's northeastern border, then flows southwest through the middle of the commune.

== History ==
The commune and the region are part of the Saône-et-Loire coal basin, which began to be exploited industrially in the 19th century. It was then under the political, economic, and financial control of the Chagot dynasty, which owned the Blanzy Mines Company. This family distinguished itself by significantly supporting Catholicism, which allowed them to monitor their miners. Between 1856 and the period of the Montceau-les-Mines troubles (1878-1885), it is estimated that more than 400 male and female miners died in the mine's numerous shafts due to very harsh working and living conditions, without protection provided to the workers—who started working from the age of 12—against potential accidents.

This situation continued until the period of the troubles, when many miners and inhabitants of the region and the commune joined anarchism, an ideology and political movement aiming to abolish all unjust domination and strongly opposing capitalism and the State. During this period, a number of inhabitants of the region, including Blanzy, became involved in the Black Band, one or more secret anarchist organizations committing numerous attacks and bombings in the region. This penetration of anarchism in the region sparked the beginning of a significant and radical syndicalist movement in Blanzy and the neighboring communes—the first chambres syndicales ('local trade unions') founded there openly oriented towards anarchism.

== Population ==
Historical population
Year	Pop.	±% p.a.
1968	4,470	—
1975	4,975	+1.54%
1982	6,739	+4.43%
1990	7,642	+1.58%
1999	7,070	−0.86%
2007	6,771	−0.54%
2012	6,481	−0.87%
2017	6,146	−1.06%
2023	5,955	−0.52%
Source: INSEE

== See also ==
- Communes of the Saône-et-Loire department
- Blanzy Mining Museum

== Bibliography ==
- Beaubernard, Robert (1981), Montceau-les-Mines: Un laboratoire social au XIXe siècle [Montceau-les-Mines: A social laboratory in the 19th century], Avallon: Éditions de Civry, p. 316, ISBN 978-2-85983-024-3
