= Montceau-les-Mines troubles =

1878–1885 conflict in Saône-et-Loire, France

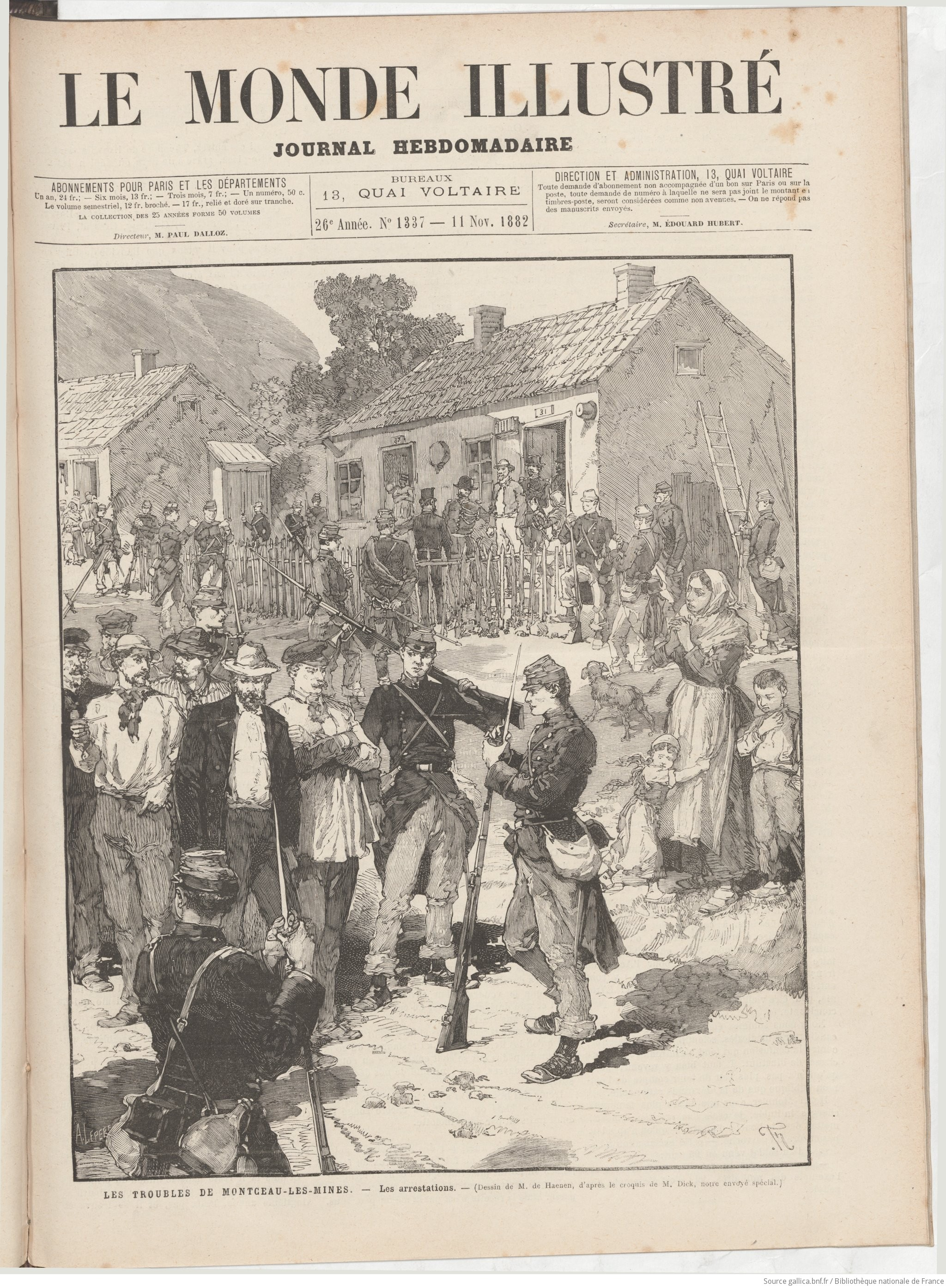
- Arrests and raids by the French army in Montceau-les-Mines, Le Monde illustré (4 November 1882)
- Date: 1878-1885
- Location: Saône-et-Loire

Parties
(France) France; French army French police Catholic Church	Anarchists; Black Band; Black International (?); Miners

Number
Thousands	At least hundreds but maybe way more

Casualties and losses
5 injured (4 heavy)	?

Casualties
- Arrested: 2 arrests and trials targetting each one dozens of alleged members

The Montceau-les-Mines troubles are a series of social movements and events that took place in Montceau-les-Mines, France and, more broadly, in a large part of Saône-et-Loire, roughly between 1878 and 1885. The period was marked by a strong penetration of anarchism within the population - particularly among the miners - of the region, and saw the appearance of the syndicalist movement in Saône-et-Loire, associated with anarchism at the time. It was characterised by great political violence between the French State and the anarchists of the region, some of whom joined the Black Band.

In 1878, the Saône-et-Loire coal basin had been under the financial and political control of the Chagot family for over fifty years. This family owned the Blanzy Coal Mine Company and employed thousands of miners - women, men, and children - in very harsh working and living conditions. Aided by the local clergy, who kept watch over recalcitrant or republican, socialist, and anarchist workers, Léonce Chagot, mayor of Montceau-les-Mines and company director, was able to ensure his control over the region. In 1878, however, he was defeated in the municipal elections of Montceau-les-Mines, where he had been mayor since the town's foundation - this electoral defeat was accompanied by a sudden strike launched by the miners, which was repressed by the army and stopped as abruptly as it began. Some French authorities at the time believed it was a strike launched by the Anti-authoritarian International - the main anarchist organisation of the period; others thought it was an autonomous and local movement with no real connection to this organisation.

After the repression of the 1878 strike by the army, the miners began to gather in one or more secret anarchist societies, possibly linked to the nascent trade unions being founded, which started to radicalise their actions. These secret societies, known by the collective name of the Black Band, began to target symbols of the Catholic Church and threaten the clergy, demanding the dismissal of the priest of Bois-du-Verne, who spied on and had workers fired if he disliked them personally and politically.

During the summer of 1882, a police report indicated that a delegate from Montceau-les-Mines was allegedly in Geneva with members of the Jura Federation branch of the Black International such as Élisée Reclus or Varlam Cherkezishvili—during their discussion, he supposedly maintained that the global anarchist revolution would be launched by France the following day, starting in Montceau-les-Mines and complained about the fact that he lacked support from that branch of the Black International.

Two days later, a group looted an armory and transferred the recovered weapons and explosives to hundreds of miners—who converged on the Bois-du-Verne chapel and set it on fire. They tried to march on the surrounding villages but stopped en route. The army intervened the next day, and the authorities arrested a large number of miners—about thirty of whom were brought to trial in October 1882, even as the Black Band continued its attacks and began to target people in addition to symbols. French authorities were concerned about the trial continuing in Chalon—especially since the start of the 1882-1883 Lyon attacks further frightened them, and they requested its adjournment and relocation. Meanwhile, a vast repressive movement began, targeting anarchists in France, particularly in Lyon with the Trial of the 66, where Lyon anarchists were suspected of having supported the Montceau-les-Mines troubles.

Between 1883 and 1884, the Black Band continued its attacks in the region, with increasing violence—targeting its victims using two different methods, according to the historian Emmanuel Germain. If the target was a suspected police informant, he would have been spared after a spectacular attack, likely to intimidate potential informers without killing him. Conversely, the organization's 'bourgeois' targets, such as the engineer Michalowski, who collaborated in police investigations, were allegedly targeted much more decisively with a clear intent to kill them. Despite this view, no deaths were reported throughout the entire period. In 1884, the arrest of a dozen potential members led to the slowing down and subsequent disappearance of the attacks.

This period as a whole are part of the broader history of anarchism, the workers' movement, propaganda by the deed, the Saône-et-Loire coal basin, and many questions remain about these troubles, particularly whether the miners became anarchists autonomously or if, conversely, they were connected to anarchist organisations such as the Black International.

== History ==
=== Context ===
==== Situation of the miners in Montceau-les-Mines and the surrounding region ====
Map of the Saône-et-Loire mining basin, with the biggest mining concessions - often owned by the Chagot family - visible on the map

The region surrounding Montceau-les-Mines, Blanzy, Epinac, Le Creusot, Montchanin, and Perrecy-les-Forges is part of the Saône-et-Loire coal basin. The region has been used for mining activities for a relatively long time but saw significant industrialisation starting in the 19th century. At the beginning of that century, the Chagot family, descended from Louis XVI's former wine merchant, decided to invest their capital in the region by taking over the mines and industrialising them. Thanks to this significant financial support, the family, initially from a well-off background but not belonging to the upper bourgeoisie, came to penetrate 'big capitalism', according to historian Robert Beaubernard.

In parallel with these developments specific to the evolution of capitalism in France, the town of Montceau-les-Mines was created ex nihilo to favour mining exploitation and the gathering of the working population in the area where the mines were located. Numerous workers moved there, hoping to find employment, and were employed in the mines. Furthermore, the Chagot family began to occupy political positions and thus came to exert significant political and financial control over the region. In fact, from its foundation, Montceau-les-Mines was led by Léonce Chagot, nephew of the previous boss—himself a Deputy of Saône-et-Loire, elected as the town's first mayor in 1856.

The working and living conditions for the miners of the Blanzy Coal Company, directed by the Chagot family, were abysmal. Work generally began around the age of 12, the working day could start as early as 4 in the morning, and the miners descended for 10 hours a day into the mines to extract coal; women, including widows and single women, worked in the mine but were not sent to the bottom of it. Protections against accidents, such as firedamp explosions, were non-existent, and over four hundred miners were killed up to the period of the troubles, an 'enormous figure', according to Beaubernard.

The Chagot family, which managed the town planning as they wished, decided to establish paternalistic structures there; it is estimated that during the period of the troubles, 6,500 male and female miners worked in the mine, a substantial part of the town, which relied on the financial support of the company and the family. Moreover, the town's schools were run by the company—allowing it to educate the miners' children and thus have succeeding generations of labour in its mines. Politically, the Chagots, and Léonce Chagot in particular, were described as Bonapartists by the Prefect of Saône-et-Loire, but it is more likely that they were avowed conservatives ready to support any regime as long as it served their interests and did not interfere with their economic affairs.

Black International and anarchist groups along the French-Swiss border in the early 1880s.

To ensure their control over the mines and minds, the Chagots used a political theology by presenting themselves as bosses by divine right; they also used social Christianity to grant some social advances and thus calm down any demands that might arise in the mine. They particularly relied on the local clergy, who were, for example, involved in surveillance activities on their behalf—in order to identify which miners were republican, socialist, or anarchist, and thus have them fired.

==== Birth and development of anarchism ====
While the situation in Montceau-les-Mines was evolving towards an acceleration of industrialisation and mining exploitation during the 19th century, this situation was not unique to the region. The development of capitalism saw the formation of several opposing political ideologies and movements, particularly anarchism, Marxism, and socialism. Anarchists advocate for the struggle against all forms of domination perceived as unjust, among which is economic domination, with the development of capitalism. They are particularly opposed to the State, viewed as the institution enabling the endorsement of many of these dominations through its police, army, and propaganda.

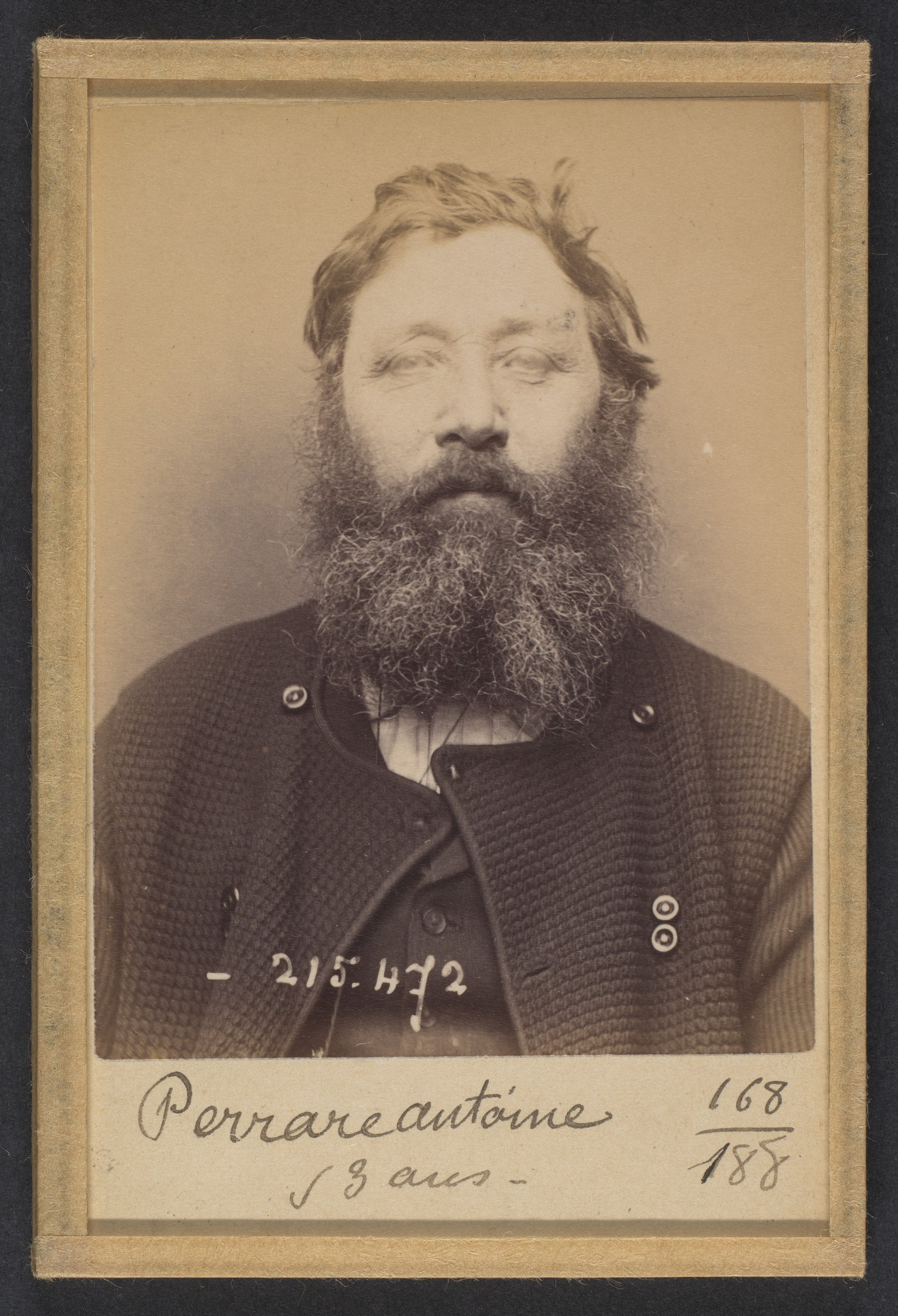
Antoine Perrare's (a former Communard and member of the Anti-authoritarian International) mugshot taken by Alphonse Bertillon (Anthropometric File of Anarchists - 1894)

Unlike the Marxists, who believed that achieving communism, where all goods are owned in common, would require retaining the State for a time—a supposedly transitional phase known as the dictatorship of the proletariat—anarchists like Bakunin considered this transitional phase highly problematic and leading instead towards dictatorship. Theoretical and personal oppositions on this subject, among others, between Bakunin and Marx led the latter to have the anarchists excluded from the First International at the Hague Congress (1872). Bakunin then gathered with other anarchists and founded the Anti-authoritarian International, a federation seeking to bring anarchists together and allow them to act and think collectively; one of its important branches was the Jura Federation, founded in the Swiss Jura and which spread around its region.

Lyon and the surrounding region quickly became an important center for anarchism – the anarchists there formed a more or less informal Lyonnaise Federation due to the fact that the French authorities prohibited the organization in France and it was thus clandestine. Because of the proximity of the Rhône and Switzerland, the two maintained important links, for example, exiles from Lyon such as Antoine Perrare settled in Switzerland – but there were also differences between the two groups of anarchists within the anti-authoritarian International.

=== 1878 strike ===
==== Premices ====
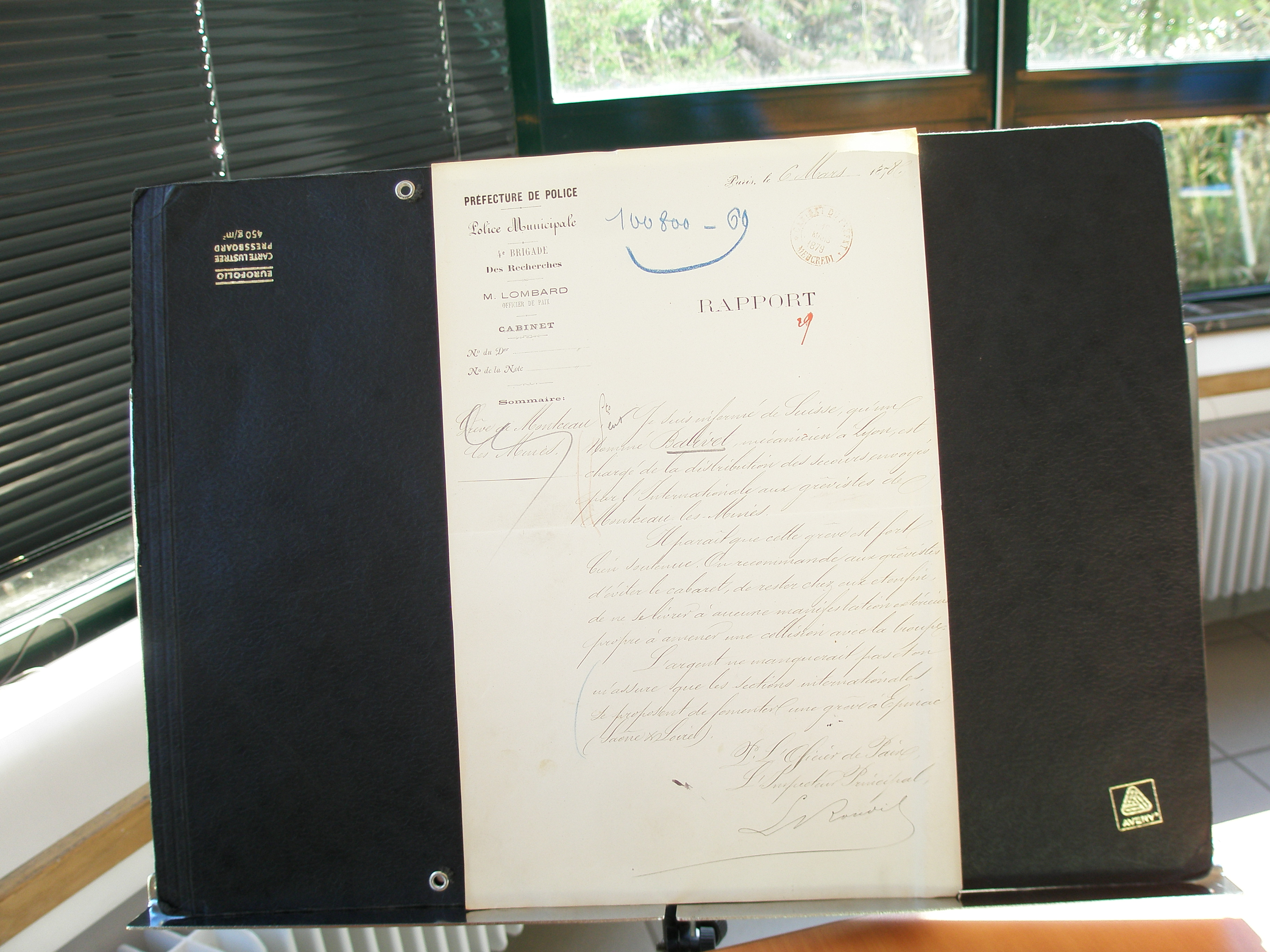
Police report signaling the activity of anarchist Balivet in the 1878 strike (courtesy of Archives Anarchistes)

In 1877, as the Second Empire (1852–1870) was a memory of almost a decade, a first change in the visible political landscape of the region manifested itself when a Republican candidate, Philippon, was elected as mayor of Saint-Vallier, replacing Jules Chagot, Léonce's recently deceased uncle.

In the 1877 legislative elections, the same situation recurred, and in the municipal elections of January 1878, Léonce Chagot was defeated by Doctor Jeannin, a Republican, who took the mayor's office with his entire list being elected—thus ending Chagot's twenty-two year reign over the municipality.

==== The Montceau-les-Mines strike : a quick strike repressed by the army ====
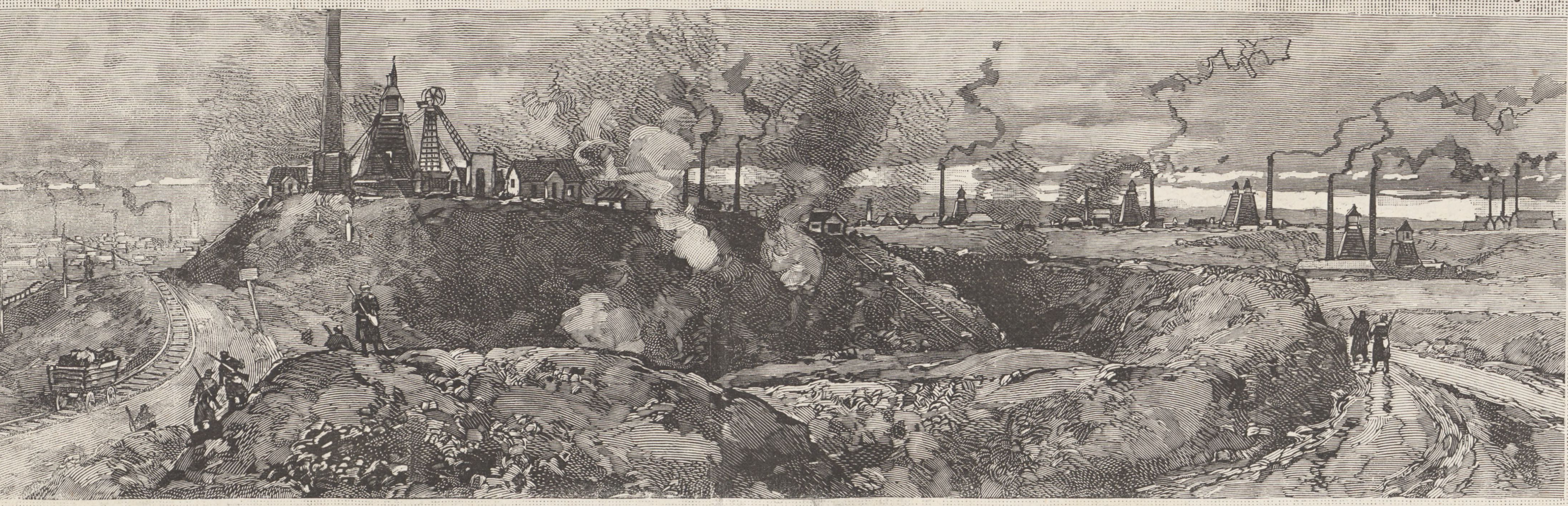
Army occupying Montceau-les-Mines, Le Monde illustré (4 November 1882)

In the night of 27-28 February 1878, a gathering of miners attempted to prevent others from going to work. Nine of them were arrested, and the press wrote in its initial reports that 'everything appears calm'. The gendarmerie was deployed around the mine shafts to monitor the strikers and the resumption of work. By the evening of the 28th, the strike had already spread, and miners attempted to forcefully free those arrested—the army was sent in the form of an infantry battalion, which joined the eight gendarmerie brigades deployed on site. Serious troubles agitated Épinac at the same time.

On the evening of 1 March, the following day, the strike was 'almost complete' in Montceau-les-Mines. In the two weeks that followed, the strike spread throughout the whole coal basin, causing various clashes between the army, the police, and the miners, before suddenly stopping for no apparent reason, two weeks after its beginning. It was marked by a brutal intervention by the French army, called in by the prefect, which managed to 'restore order'.

===== Responsabilities and analyses of the strike's causes =====
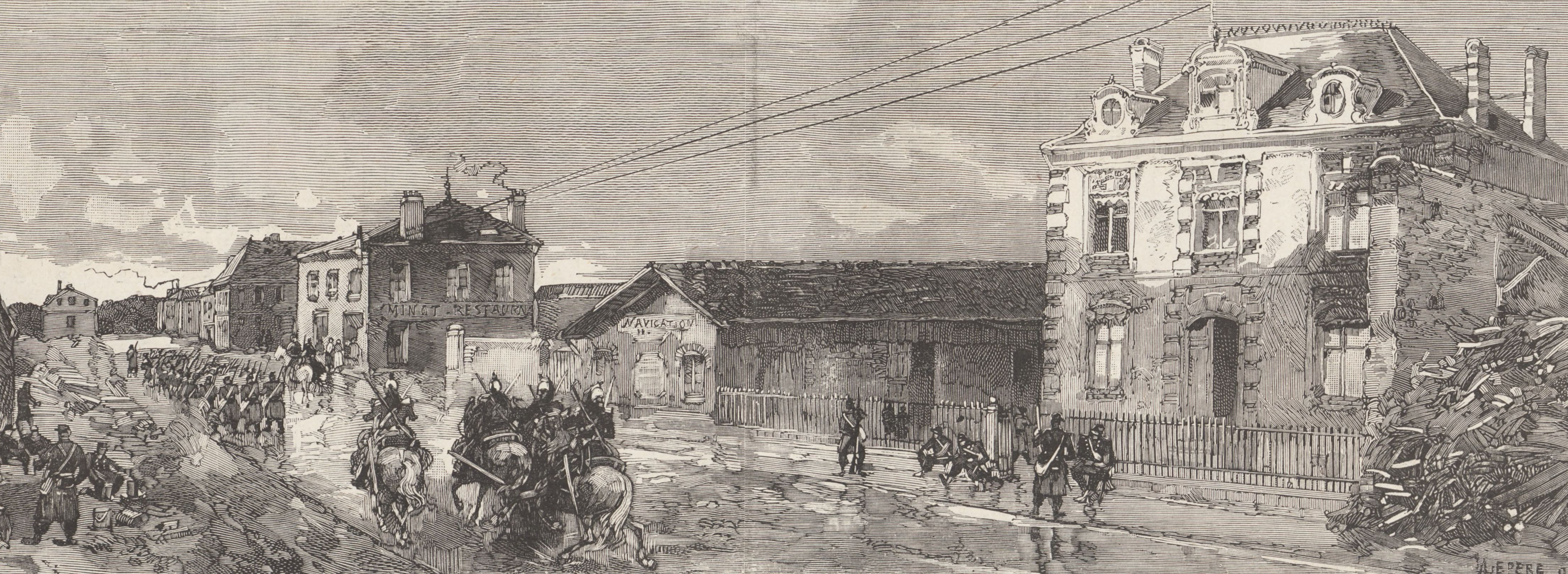
Army occupying Montceau-les-Mines, Le Monde illustré (4 November 1882)

French authorities, seeking to discover the precise cause of the strike, noted the presence of several anarchists from the Anti-authoritarian International, such as Balivet, an anarchist from the International operating in Lyon—a city near Saône-et-Loire—who was suspected of managing fund transfers between the International and the strikers. However, the agent who noticed Balivet nuanced his opinion in a later report, arguing that he couldn't decisively prove the International's involvement in the strike and that the links were likely personal connections between activists in a movement primarily conceived and organised in the region by the miners themselves.

The Prefect, Ernest Hendlé, himself a Republican and an anti-clerical who was not favourably disposed towards Chagot and his ultraclericalism—which perhaps influenced his interpretation of the affair—sent a reassuring report to Paris after the strike ended. In it, he maintained that the matter was inconsequential and would not be followed by further action. Conversely, the prosecutor of Saône-et-Loire presented a different view, supposing that the Anti-authoritarian International was behind these events. He argued that the comings and goings of several anarchists in the region were premeditated and that the strike was potentially launched by the Anti-authoritarian International to 'test the waters and prepare for more serious movements later'.

=== The Black Band ===
==== La Marianne : a proto-Black Band, and propaganda of the deed ====
At least starting from the defeat of the Montceau workers during this strike, and while the presence of anarchism began to be documented in the region, one or more secret societies formed among the miners of the basin. This group or these groups adopted a series of elements from the Republican tradition; the main one was named La Marianne, which tends to indicate that initially, they were not necessarily anarchist but rather dedicated to defending the young Third Republic—thus supporting Jeannin against Chagot in their local conflict.

La Marianne adopted a series of elements from the tradition of secret societies; it was a closed group where entry was by co-option, specific and secret recognition signs were shared by the affiliates, and there were also particular initiation ceremonies, although these accounts are not always reliable. Historian Emmanuel Germain considers that all these elements tend to show that the Black Band has origins rooted in the Republican tradition and, more broadly, in pre-anarchist secret societies, similar to Carbonari. Besides Carbonarism, which was specific to the Italian situation, closer references exist, such as the Comité de la rue Grôlée in Lyon, a radical republican secret organization founded in the very first moments of the Third Republic and spreading across a part of French territory. One of its figures, Favier, joined anarchism and the anti-authoritarian/Black International in Lyon after the failure of this committee.

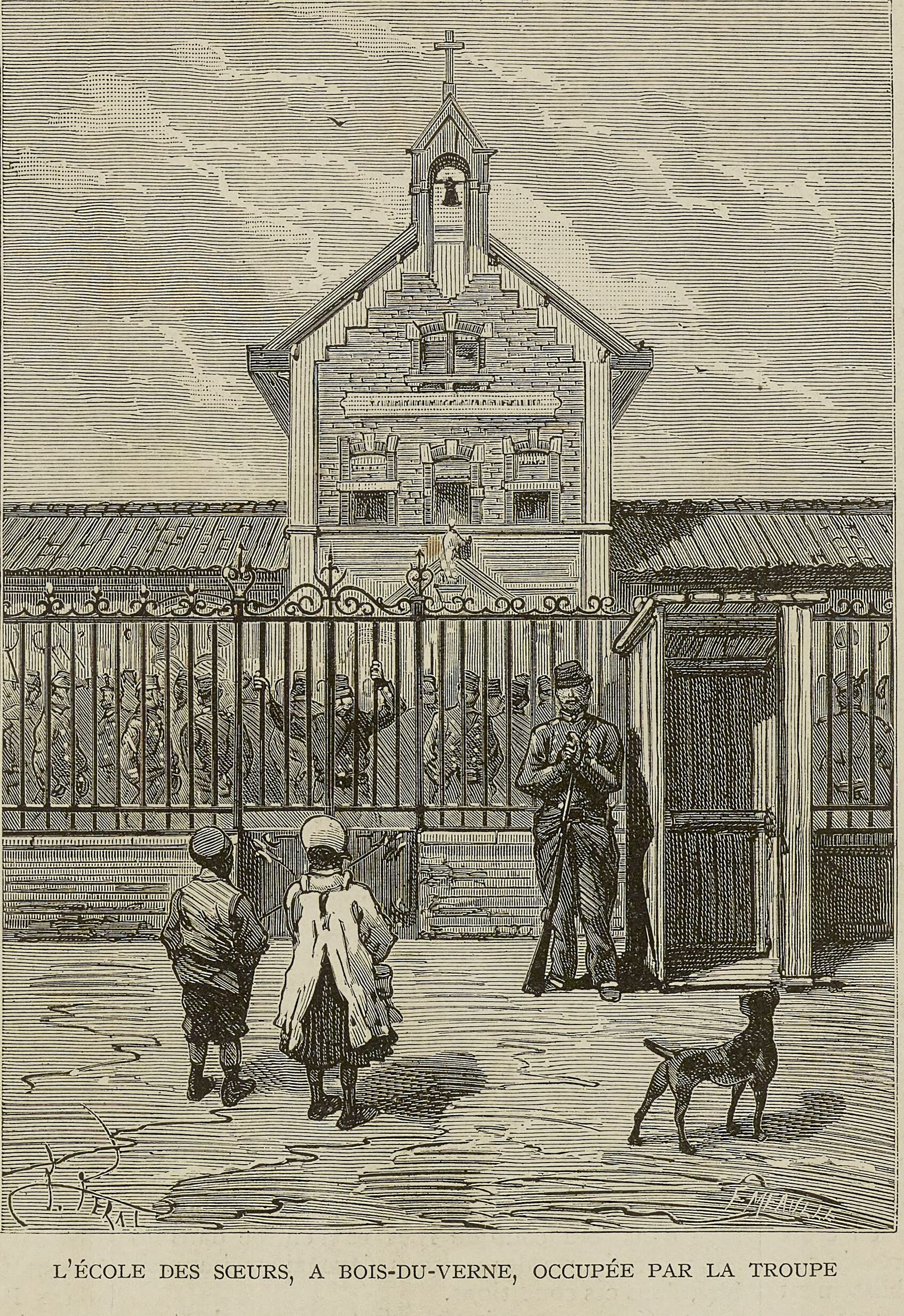
School of the Sisters in Bois-du-Verne occupied by the French army, L'Illustration (4 November 1882)

In parallel with these local developments, at the end of the 1870s, anarchists developed the strategy of propaganda by the deed, aiming to communicate anarchist ideas directly through action, without recourse to discourse, and to precipitate the Revolution through actions that incite the people to revolt. Leading anarchist figures extensively developed this strategy, such as Peter Kropotkin, Errico Malatesta, Andrea Costa, Carlo Cafiero, and especially Johann Most. In 1879, it was adopted by the congress of the Jura Federation in La Chaux-de-Fonds. It gained renewed centrality at the International Congresses of Paris and London in May and July 1881.

In 1881, the first attack of this nature in France, the Saint-Germain-en-Laye bombing, failed to destroy the statue of Adolphe Thiers that it targeted.

==== Summer 1882 : an eventual meeting and burning of the Bois-du-Verne chapel ====
The local clergy, personified by father Gauthier of Bois-du-Verne, sought to identify affiliates of the Black Band and workers who did not share Chagot's political opinions; any political dissent could be punished by dismissal—this drew the enmity of the Black Band, which sent letters of threat to the bishopric regarding Gauthier and directly to him, such as when he received:

Citizen priest Gauthier, [...] If you have not left the country within forty-eight hours, we will take care of you. We might well get you out of your stable with a few grains of lead in your head. The Black Band.

In addition to Gauthier, the nuns of Montceau-les-Mines, led by sister Joseph, formed a veritable 'intelligence service', according to Abbot Derain, responsible for regulating marriages, the education of children, and the surveillance of political, moral, and sexual opinions: Sister Joseph was noted as particularly 'authoritarian'. This attitude and the importance of the clergy and religion in the control structures designated as the 'Chagot system' gave the Black Band a very distinct anti-clerical orientation.

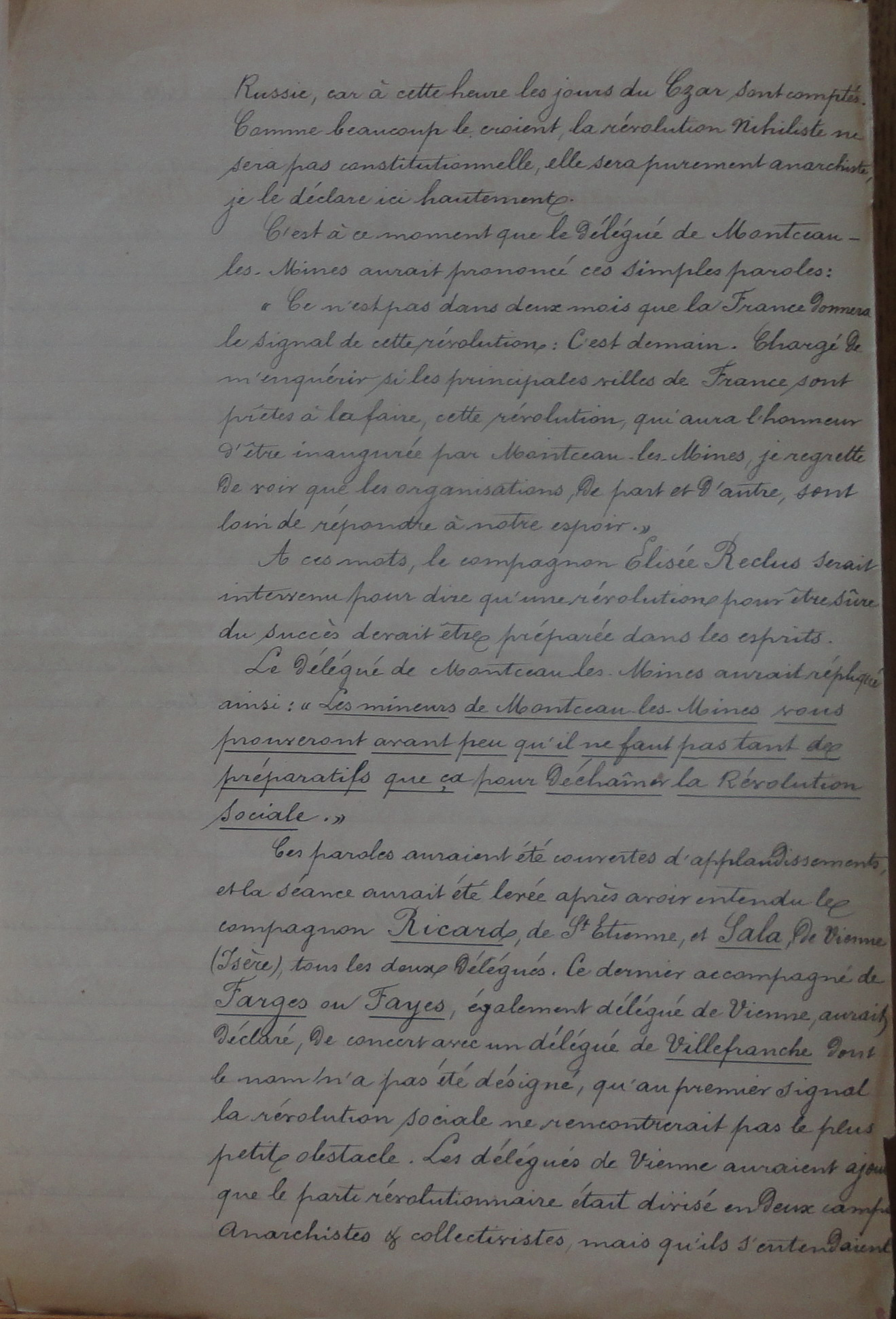
Report on the Montceau-les-Mines delegate in Geneva (courtesy of Archives Anarchistes)

From the beginning of the summer of 1882, several dynamite attacks were carried out on crosses in the region, testifying to this opposition and the Black Band's commencement of action, for example, in the Alouette district of Montceau-les-Mines.

According to a French police report in Switzerland noted by the Archives Anarchistes website, concerning the international anarchist meeting held in Geneva on 13 and 14 August 1882, a delegate from Montceau-les-Mines, under the name of Girardet fils, allegedly attended this meeting where numerous anarchists associated with the Jura Federation of the Anti-authoritarian/Black International were also present. Following a discussion that purportedly took place about the imminence of the anarchist revolution in each country, with each delegate reporting on the state of the anarchist movement's forces and potential for action, Eymerich, delegate from Marseille, and Varlam Cherkezishvili allegedly debated which country, France or Russia, would see the anarchist revolution arrive first. The latter, having maintained that the revolution would arrive within two months in Russia thanks to the nihilists, who would undeniably bring about an anarchist revolution, the Montceau-les-Mines delegate allegedly stood up and declared - complaining about the lack of support he allegedly encountered, before holding a secret conversation with Cherkezishvili and Georges Herzig:

It is not in two months that France will give the signal for this revolution: It is tomorrow. Tasked with finding out if the main cities of France are ready to carry out this revolution, which will have the honour of being inaugurated by Montceau-les-Mines, I regret to see that the organisations, on both sides, are far from meeting our hopes.
[Moderating speech by Élisée Reclus, a central figure of the Jura Federation, then resumed by the Montceau delegate:] The miners of Montceau-les-Mines will soon prove to you that not so many preparations are needed to unleash the social Revolution.

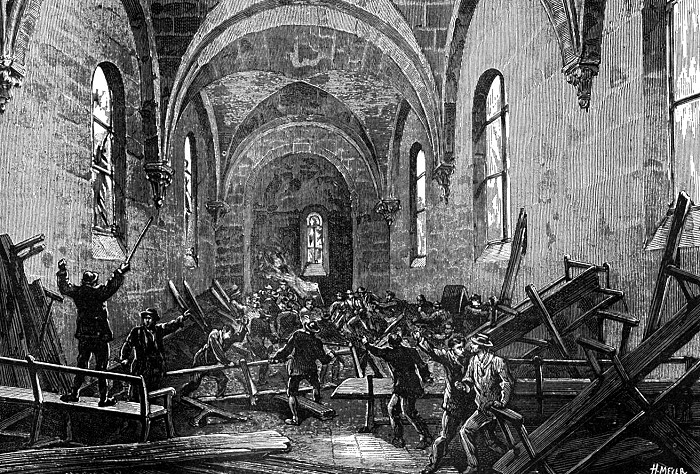
Black Band rioting and burning down the Bois-du-Verne chapel (15 August 1882)

In the night of 14 August 1882, a group of people attempted to blow up a statue of the Virgin Mary. The following day, 15 August 1882, was an important feast in the Catholic Church, being that of the Virgin Mary, and in Bonapartism—Napoleon having invented a certain Saint Napoleon whose feast was celebrated on his birthday, on 15 August. It was thus both a significant Catholic religious holiday and the national holiday of the First and Second Empires.

On the 15th, therefore, at nightfall, hundreds of miners gathered. A group led by a labourer named Devillard went to the Beaujard armoury in the place called Champ du Moulin and looted it, seizing a shipment of weapons—mainly revolvers—and explosives. They then rejoined the other miners at Bois-du-Verne and distributed the weapons and explosives they had just seized. The now armed group then converged on the Bois-du-Verne chapel—using a ladder, they climbed onto the rose window of the building, deposited a charge of dynamite there, and then detonated it. They then managed to enter and looted it, attacking it with axes and destroying many elements of the religious furniture, including the altar. From the first explosions, many other miners emerged from the woods and joined this first group.

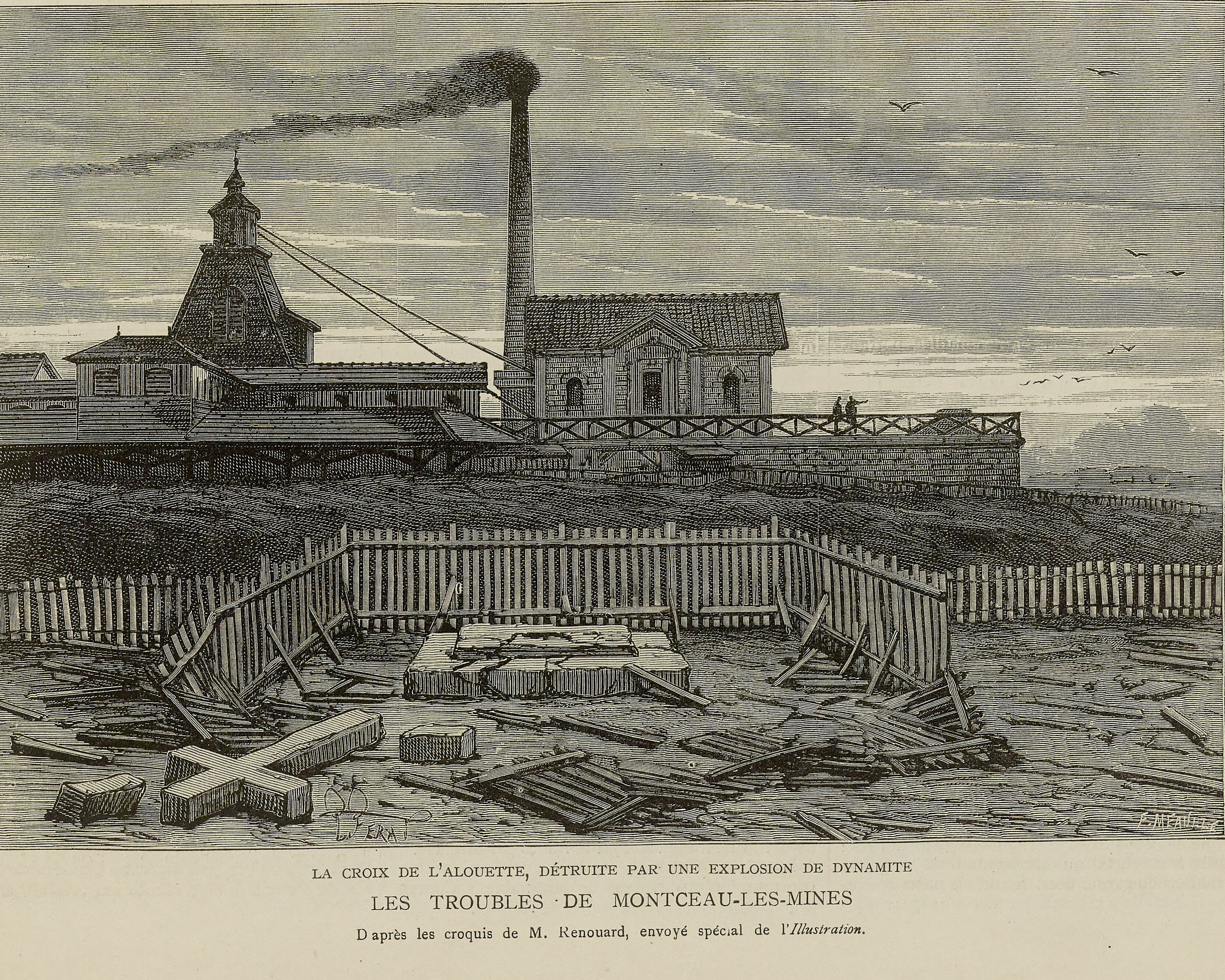
Cross of the Alouette suburb bombed in Montceau-les-Mines, L'Illustration (4 November 1882)

In the meantime, Gauthier was dining with a notable resident of Montceau-les-Mines. He was warned by the alarmed churchwarden who came to announce the ongoing looting and the fact that a team of several people was allegedly waiting to seize him on his return home. He decided to flee, disguised himself as a miner, and disappeared. His escape enraged the members of the Black Band who were waiting for him, and this group turned on the house occupied by the nuns, where they began to break in by shattering windows and doors. The sisters took refuge in their oratory and took communion, believing they were about to be killed. Despite this fear, the group allegedly considered that seizing or killing 'women' would be shameful, and they turned back, sparing them. It was then around 1 in the morning. Two mine guards realised what was happening and decided to hide for fear of being seized as well. Interestingly, the rioters did not attack the Brothers' house, adjacent to the Sister's' house; this may have been a conscious choice after one rioter remarked, 'leave those poor morons alone... they are as much slaves as us'.

At Bois-du-Verne, the group then numbered between 250 and 300 people, a notable proportion of the Montceau-les-Mines population. They returned to the chapel around 2 in the morning, piled up the benches, doors, and confessionals, before setting the whole structure on fire. They then began to march on the surrounding villages with a red flag at the front, shouting:

Long live the Social Revolution! Death to the bourgeois!

However, the marching group noticed that the villages were not joining in—they then scattered on the road to Blanzy and disappeared.

The very next day, French troops were on site with the army and numerous gendarmerie brigades. The authorities arrested dozens of people suspected of having participated in the gathering of the 15th, which did not prevent the anarchists from targeting the Magny chapel a few days later, on which revolutionary posters were plastered during the night.

==== Autumn-Winter 1882 : national and international repercussions, continuation of the attacks ====
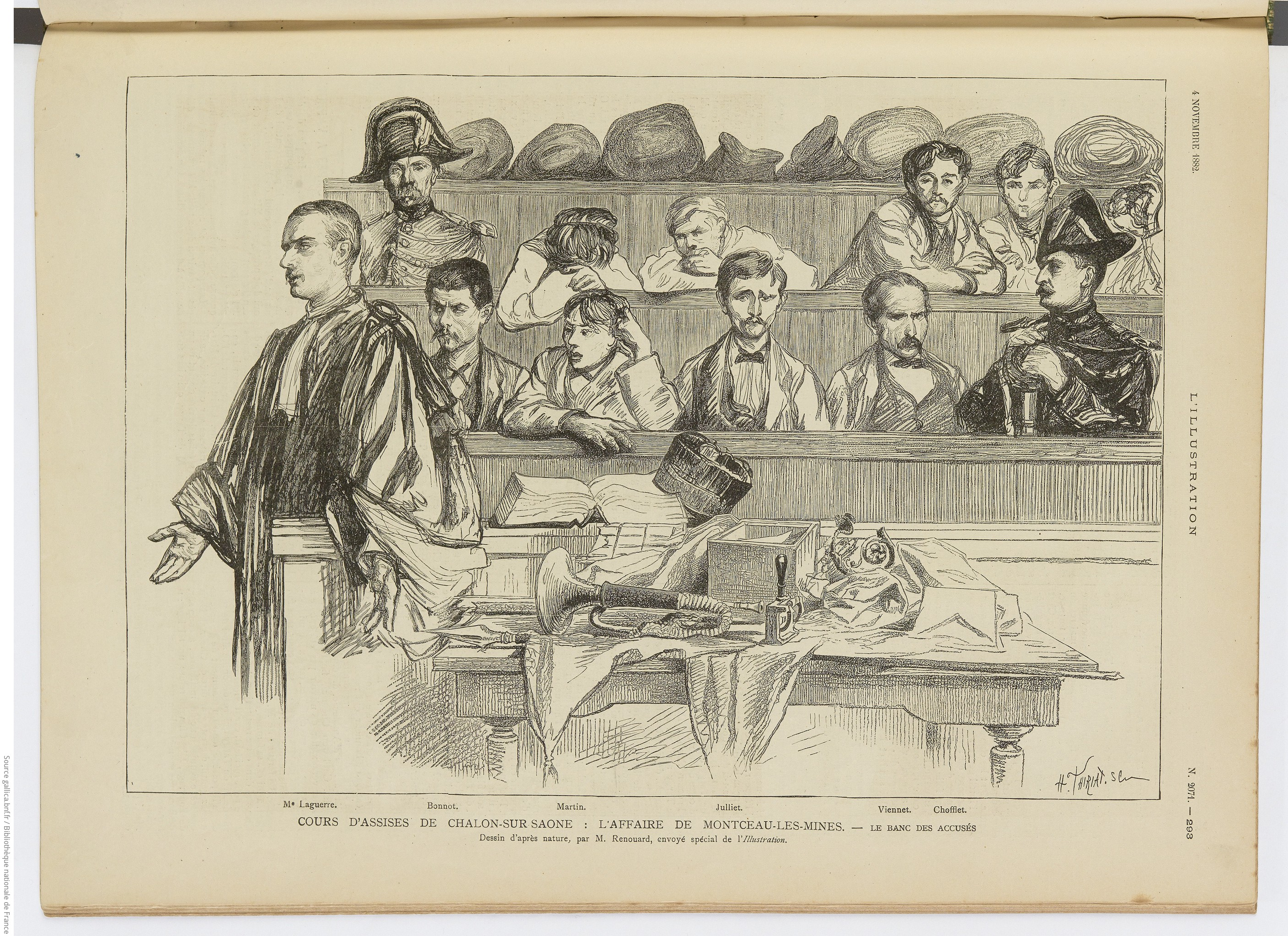
First trial of the Black Band - before having been moved away, here in Chalon, L'Illustration (4 November 1882)

The incident, which had a certain impact at the time, was discussed in the anarchist press, which supported the miners and argued that it was a movement unconnected to any anarchist organisation—the miners had been 'instinctively' drawn to anarchism and the desire to lead the Social Revolution advocated by anarchists. Jean Grave's Le Révolté complained that the miners hadn't carried their action through to the end, which would have meant not sparing the bourgeois they encountered.

According to some members of the Anti-authoritarian International, this choice was made independently of them; a position reviewed by Beaubernard, who questioned the links between the anarchists of the International and those in Montceau, particularly around two cities, Lyon and Geneva. In any case, Toussaint Bordat, a figure in the Anti-authoritarian International in Lyon, travelled to the region to liaise with the anarchist press in Lyon, particularly l'Étendard révolutionnaire ('The Revolutionary Standard').

On 18 October 1882, the trial of the 23 accused for the action on the night of 15-16 September began before the Assize Court of Saône-et-Loire in Chalon-sur-Saône. The names and ages of these 23 individuals accused of being members of the Black Band and responsible for the 15 August attacks are as follows:

Jean Viennet, 47 years old; François Juillet, 25 years old; Jean-Marie Brelaud, 26 years old; Léonard Demesple, 20 years old; Charles Spenlhaüer, 21 years old; Etienne Garnier, 23 years old; Pierre Lautrev, 25 years old; Jean-Marie Laugerette, 20 years old; Eugène Devillard: 21 years old; Claude Loriot, 21 years old; Claude Château, 21 years old; Claude Gillot, 25 years old; Antoine Bonnot, 43 years old; Charles Piller, 19 years old; Louis Thomas, 20 years old; Jean-Marie Livet, 17 years old; Louis Chofflet, 26 years old; Benoit Virot, 17 years old; Jean-Marie Durix, 18 years old: Jean Breuzot, 20 years old; Claude Martin, 18 years old; and François Suchet, 17 years old.

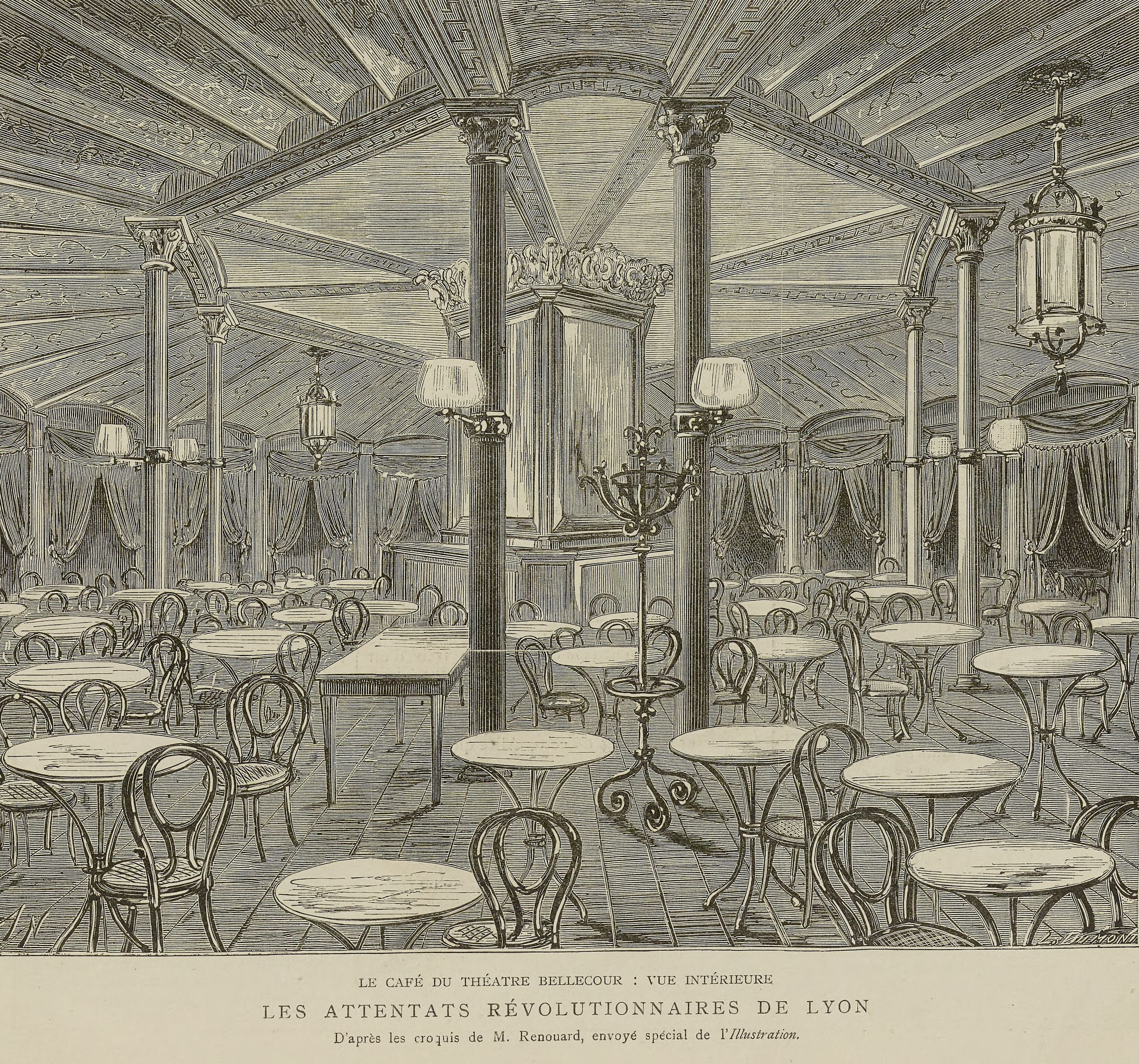
Assommoir bombing in L'Illustration (4 November 1882)

The trial opened amid great fear on the part of the authorities, because, in the meantime, the Black Band undertook a vast series of attacks, targeting the crosses of Gourdon (13 September), Pouilloux (2 October), and la Ragée (10 October). Dynamite was also placed in front of the residence of the nuns of Sanvignes in Génelard (13 October), and an explosion destroyed the stained-glass windows of the church of Saint-Vallier the following day.

The Black Band also began to target people, generally following two methods of action according to Germain—if the target was considered an informer, the Band would try to attack them without killing them, to inspire terror; if the target was bourgeois or connected to the Catholic Church, the plan would seemingly be the opposite: to assassinate them. On September 12th and October 12th, a master miner and a certain Gardenet were shot at and survived.

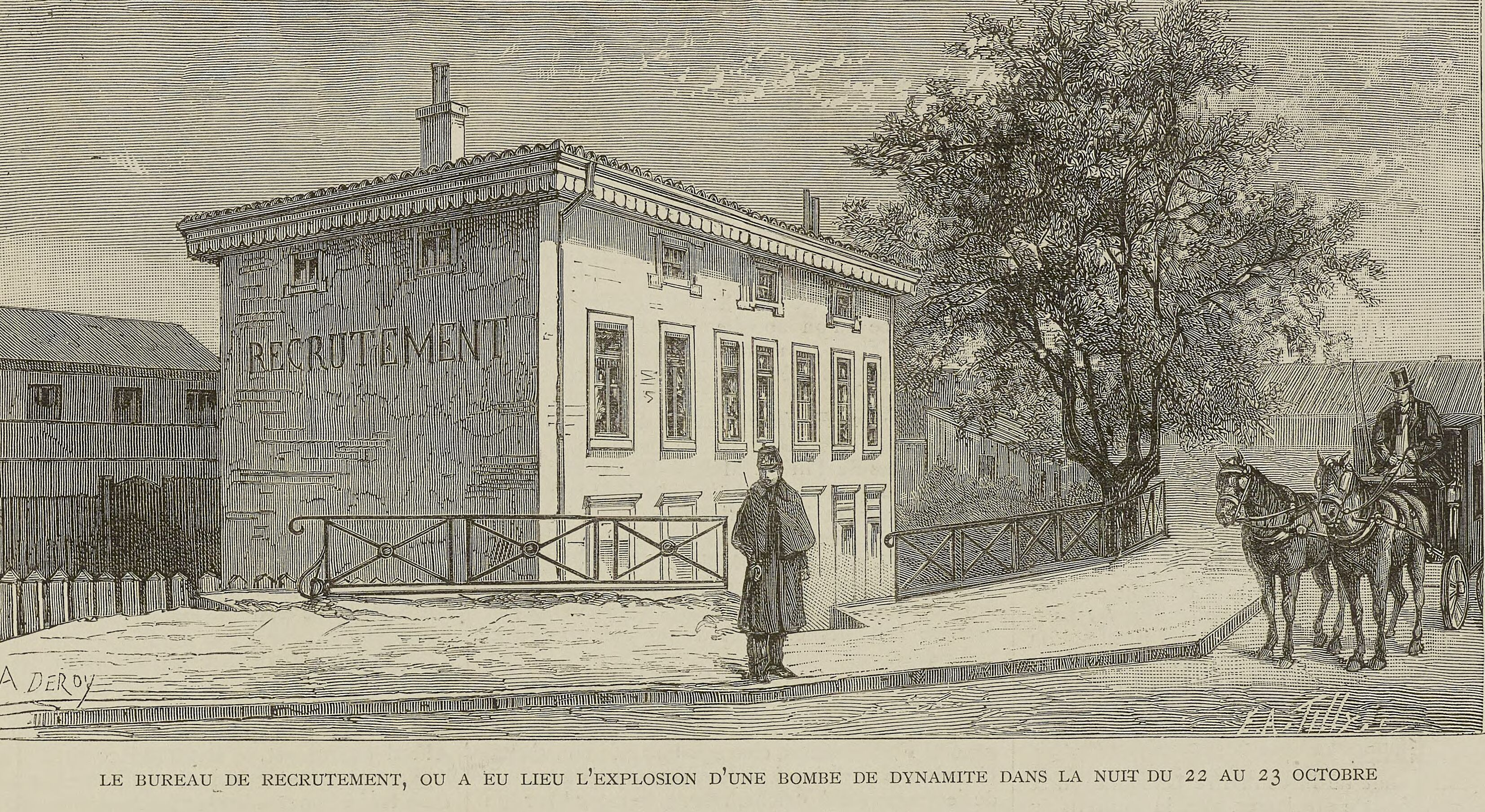
Bombing of a recruitment office in Lyon, during the night of 22-23 October 1882, L'Illustration (4 November 1882)

Five days after the trial began, the 1882-1883 Lyon attacks started with the Assommoir bombing. The day after this attack, the prosecutor—fearing to continue the trial at that location, particularly for the jurors, requested that it be adjourned and relocated.

In parallel with these developments, a major wave of repression began in France against the anarchist movement, a key event of which was the Trial of the 66, which targeted around sixty anarchists in Lyon - among which was Peter Kropotkin - accused of belonging to a conspiracy—including the Montceau-les-Mines troubles—and other charges. The trial of the members arrested for the action of the 15th, which had been adjourned and relocated to Riom, opened on 14 December 1882. The sentences handed down were as follows:

Devilard, 5 years in prison, Viennet, 3 years, Loriot, Juillet, Demesple, Garnier, 2 years, Château, Chofflet and Spenlhauer, 1 year.

==== 1883-1884 : the 'social war' of the Black Band ====
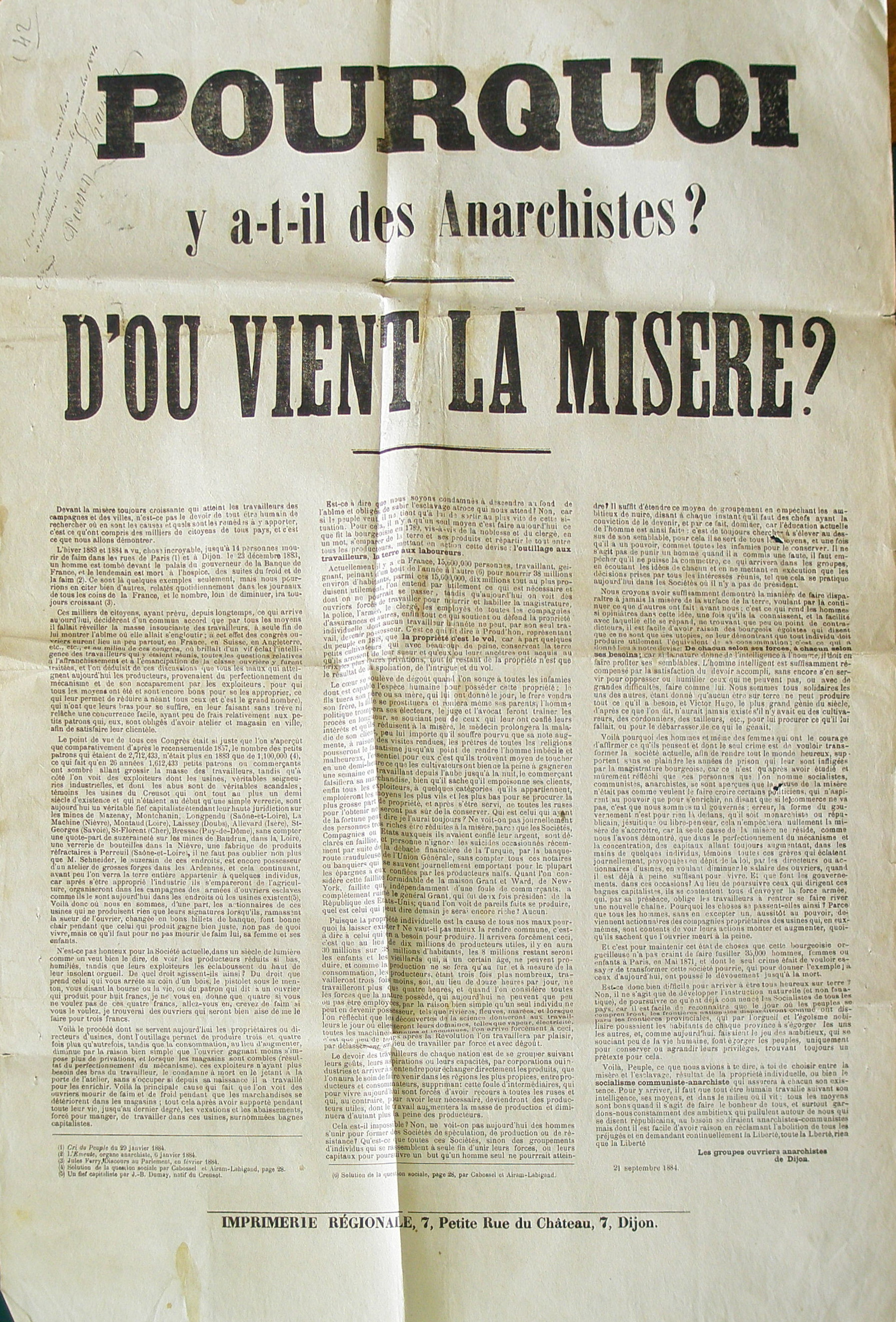
Manifesto of the Dijon Anarchists (François Monod?) seized at the home of Pierson (?), a resident of Montchanin suspected of being a member of the Black Band (courtesy of Archives Anarchistes)

A true "social war" was launched by the Black Band from 1883. Aided and supported by networks within the local population, it was capable of deploying across the territory and acting. According to Germain, the group would resume its dichotomy: on the one hand, sparing informers or suspected informers, whose houses would have often been targeted by dynamite attacks but using small, non-lethal charges, suggesting that the Black Band's interest would not be in killing them but rather in frightening them and other potential informers; and on the other hand, targeting more bourgeois individuals, who would be more clearly intended to be assassinated.

One such target, the mine engineer Michalowski, who agreed to provide explosives expertise for the Charolles prosecutor's office in investigations concerning the Black Band, survived three attacks that would have 'almost certainly be intended to murder him'; one of these blew up the building he was in, shattering all 38 windows of the building. Despite this orientation that the Band allegedly had and which is defended by Germain, there were no deaths throughout the entire period in dozens of attacks, however.

Other targets had shots fired into their windows or dynamite thrown at their homes; the attacks often followed the same modus operandi, taking place on the night of Saturday to Sunday.

This orientation was claimed by the affiliates, who fully embraced their anarchist identity by writing to Le Révolté—a major anarchist publication in France—and stating that they wished to stop attacks on symbols of the Catholic Church and refocus on the fight against the bourgeoisie. They wrote:

Instructed by past experience, it is no longer simple crosses and other pieces of stone that we want to attack this time. We understand that these emblems of a dead religion are no longer of great danger to us; let us crush this infamous bourgeoisie that exploits us and serves as their support, and the old corrupt society that oppresses us, attacked at its foundations, will fall of its own accord, dragging clerical rot with it [...]

Over these two years, dozens of attacks followed one another in the region: throughout the entire period and the Black Band's actions, there were five injured, four seriously, but no deaths. In 1884, the police informant Brenin nevertheless managed to expose a number of potential Black Band members by reporting Jean Gueslaff, who was accused of preparing an attack—the latter denounced many presumed accomplices, and about ten were arrested, tried, and sentenced in the second Black Band trial.

=== Consequences ===
==== Birth of the syndicalist movement in Saône-et-Loire and situation of the anarchist movement ====
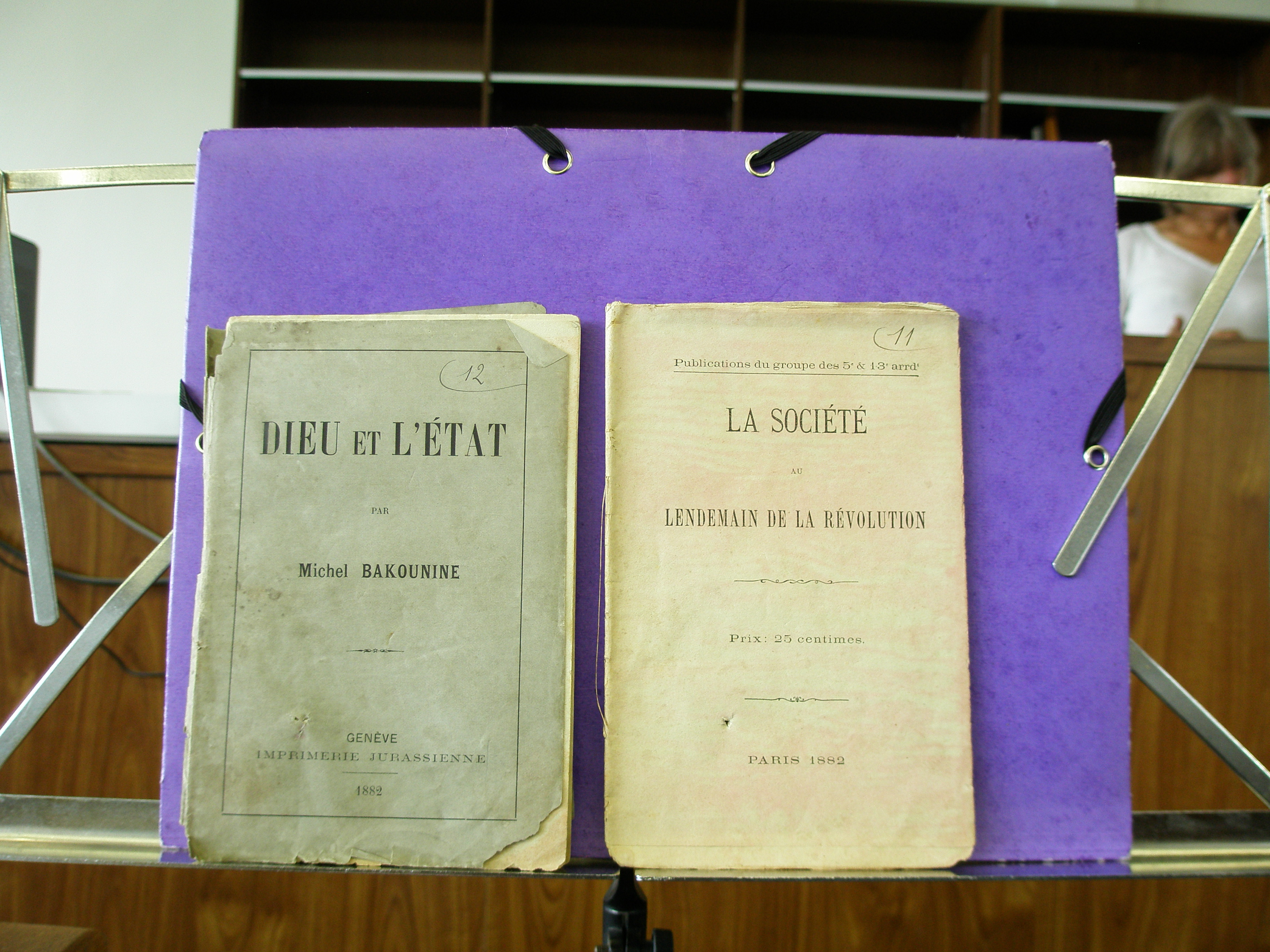
Anarchist literature (including Bakunin's God and the State) seized at the home of Briut (?), a resident of Sanvignes-les-Mines suspected of being a member of the Black Band (courtesy of Archives Anarchistes)

Throughout the entire period of the troubles, anarchist trade unions were forming in Saône-et-Loire. The Black Band, in particular, maintained numerous ties with the anarchist trade union chambers forming in the region; one of the main names associated with these creations was Jean-Baptiste Dumay, involved in the founding of the Le Creusot trade union chamber in 1880 and accused of being a kind of 'nihilist leader' of the Black Band by Chagot. In reality, he disagreed with the Black Band's actions and was not anarchist but rather a socialist reformist ; he was not followed by the trade union chambers of Montceau-les-Mines and the surrounding areas.

Generally, the trade union chambers of Montceau-les-Mines and its environs were frequently suspected of being strong supporters of the Black Band. It seems that the initiative of the region's anarchists during the 1880-1885 period was to try to establish a large anarchist network; the anarchists of Saône-et-Loire were thus in contact with those in Dijon—whose main figure at that time was François Monod—those in Lyon, with Toussaint Bordat, and other surrounding areas; their aim was to try to create a 'fabric' suitable for propagating anarchist ideas and practices in the current Bourgogne-Franche-Comté region. Germain thus describes the situation following the period of the troubles for the anarchist presence in Saône-et-Loire:

If we cross-reference the reports of their various meetings that took place in 1885, we can assume that small anarchistic groups existed in the following localities: Essertenne, Torcy, Montchanin, Blanzy, Ecuisses, Le Creusot, and of course Montceau-les-Mines. This structure would be relatively ephemeral, as at the end of 1885, Cottin and Royer, two of the initiators of this preliminary federation, called for a vote for the Republican list in Le Creusot. This defection dealt a severe blow to the movement, which would henceforth no longer worry the authorities. This revolutionary saga found its conclusion with the death of Michaud, the last important figure of the 'Black Bands era'. Gravely ill, he was regularly visited by his companions. His funeral, on 27 July 1887, was an opportunity for his companions to 'manifest in the public sphere'.

== Bibliography ==
- Beaubernard, Robert (1981), Montceau-les-Mines: Un laboratoire social au XIXe siècle [Montceau-les-Mines: A social laboratory in the 19th century], Avallon: Éditions de Civry, p. 316, ISBN 978-2-85983-024-3
- Bébin, Lionel (1996), Les tentatives de reconstituer la Première Internationale et les débuts du mouvement anarchiste à Lyon (mémoire) [The Attempts to Reconstruct the First International and the Beginnings of the Anarchist Movement in Lyon, 1871–1881 (memoir)], Lyon: University Lyon II
- Berthier, René (2015), La fin de la première Internationale [The end of the First Internationale] (in French), Paris: Le Monde Libertaire, ISBN 978-2915514636
- Chambost, Anne-Sophie (2017), "" Nous ferons de notre pire… ". Anarchie, illégalisme … et lois scélérates" [«We’ll Do our Worse». Anarchy, Illegalism … and Evil Law], Droit et Cultures, 74 (2): 65–87, doi:10.4000/droitcultures.4264
- Eisenzweig, Uri (2001). Fictions de l'anarchisme [Fictions of anarchism] (in French). France: C. Bourgois. ISBN 2-267-01570-6.
- Jourdain, Edouard (2013). L'anarchisme [Anarchism]. Paris: La Découverte. ISBN 978-2-7071-9091-8.
- Merriman, John M. (2016). The dynamite club: how a bombing in fin-de-siècle Paris ignited the age of modern terror. Yale University Press. ISBN 978-0-300-21792-6.
- Ward, Colin (2004). Anarchism: A Very Short Introduction. Oxford University Press (OUP).
