= Blanzy Mining Museum =

Museum in Blanzy, France

Coordinates: 46.7015°N 4.3827°E

Musée de la Mine de Blanzy
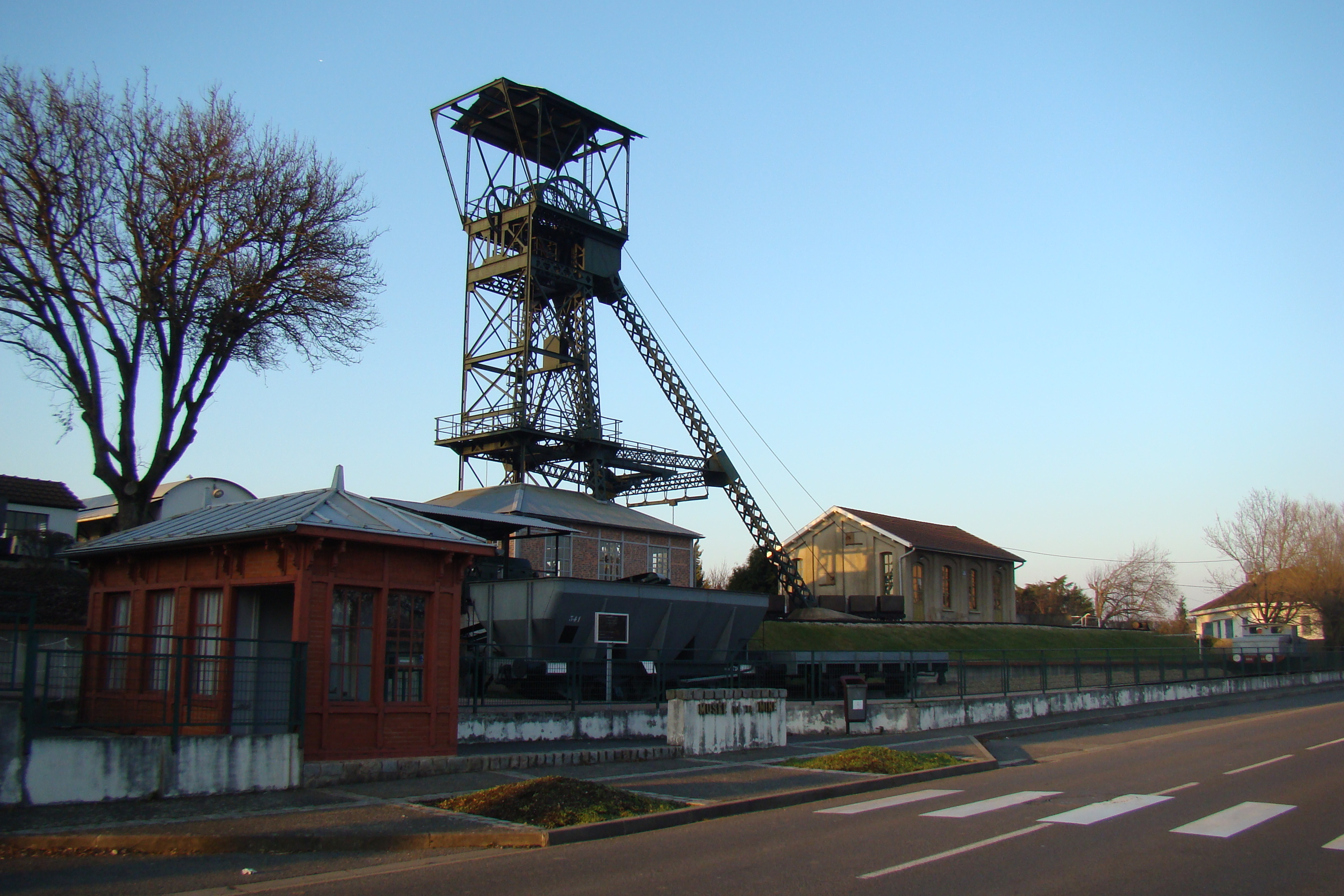
- Headframe of the Saint-Claude shaft
- Established: 1978
- Location: 34 Rue du Bois Clair, Blanzy, Saône-et-Loire, France
- Type: Mining museum
- Accreditation: Musée de France
- Collections: Ethnology: Trades and Tools; History: Thematic Museum, Local and Regional History; Science and Technology: Industry
- Collection size: 638:
- Visitors: 13,000 (2008)
- Curator: Association La Mine et les Hommes

The Blanzy Mining Museum (French: Musée de la Mine de Blanzy) is a French museum dedicated to the history of the Saône-et-Loire coal basin, recognized as a Musée de France. Established in 1978, it is located on the former mining site in the commune of Blanzy, Saône-et-Loire.

== History of the mining site ==
The Blanzy site, alongside Montceau-les-Mines, was one of three coal mining basins in Burgundy, with mining activities dating back to the 16th century. Operations at the site included underground extraction ("Fond") until 1992 and surface activities ("Jour") until 2000.

Originally part of the barony of Montcenis, the site was operated by François de la Chaise from 1761 to 1776, followed by Roettier de la Tour (1776–1777), the Desgrange-Happey-Joly et Cie company (1777–1779), and Renard et Cie until 1782. François de la Chaise resumed operations from 1782 to 1786 before relinquishing rights to the Montcenis royal foundry.

During the French Revolution, the operation was taken over by the Pourtalès-Perret-Déplace et Cie company and remained under various forms of management through the 19th century. These included Jules Chagot (until 1826), followed by the Chagot-Bassano-Perret partnership (until 1856), and later the Compagnie des Mines de Houille de Blanzy Chagot et Cie (until 1900).

In 1900, the Société Anonyme des Houillères de Blanzy, led by Émile Coste, took over until nationalization in 1946 placed the Blanzy, Montceau-les-Mines, Épinac, and Decize-La Machine basins under the Société des Bassin de Blanzy. In 1969, this entity merged with mining companies from Aquitaine, Auvergne, Cévennes, Dauphiné, Loire, and Provence, forming the Houillères de Bassin du Centre et du Midi, until the sites closed in subsequent decades.

== Origin of the museum ==
In the 1970s, Blanzy site workers, concerned about the loss of mining artifacts and equipment, sought to preserve these items under the newly established Écomusée Creusot-Montceau. They selected the inactive Saint-Claude shaft, closed since 1882, for this purpose. In 1974, the association La Mine et les Hommes was formed in partnership with the town of Blanzy, the Houillères, and the Écomusée to develop and manage the museum. The Société des Houillères de Blanzy provided the land and equipment, while the town, the Écomusée (until the museum's independence in 1981), and the Délégation interministérielle à l'aménagement du territoire et à l'attractivité régionale funded construction and restoration. The museum opened to the public in 1978, while still under development.

== Construction and development ==
- 1981: A 19th-century headframe (chevalement), listed in the General Inventory of Cultural Heritage in 1993, was relocated from the Pré Long site in Montceau-les-Mines to the Saint-Claude shaft.
- 1982: A machine room was built, and an extraction machine was reinstalled.
- 1983: Railway tracks were laid.
- 1984: A lampisterie (lamp room) was constructed and equipped.
- 1985: Surface-level mine galleries were recreated.
- 1987: The main building, housing storage, a reception area, an exhibition hall, and an audiovisual room, were completed.
- 1988: The Saint-Claude shaft was reactivated.

== Museum visit ==
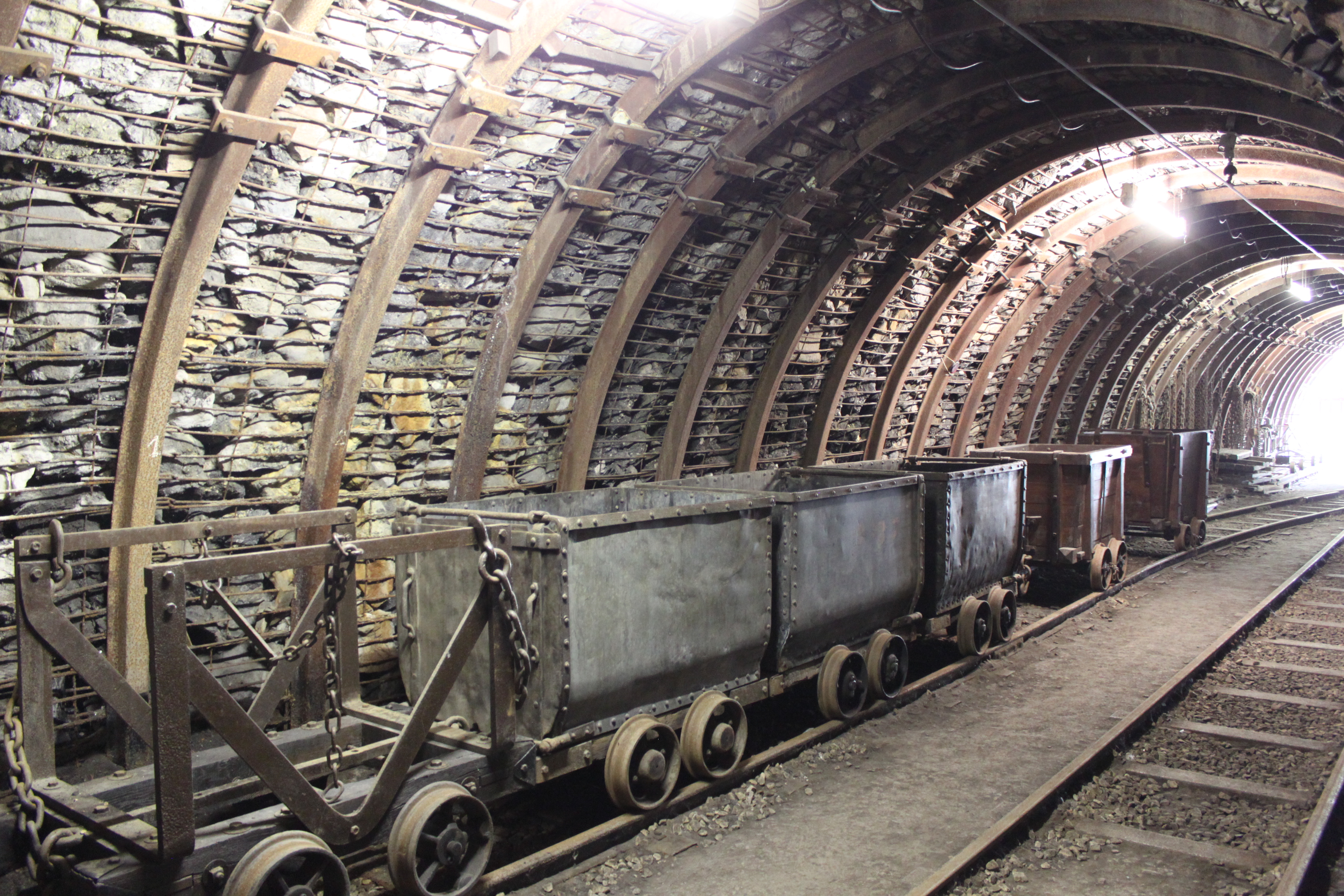
Mine gallery exhibit

The Blanzy Mining Museum is open to the public from March to November and year-round for groups by appointment. The visit consists of two parts:

- A self-guided tour exploring the history of Blanzy miners since the 18th century through photographs and engravings in the exhibition hall, followed by a video on coal formation and mining techniques in the audiovisual room.
- A 1-hour, 15-minute guided tour led by a volunteer from the La Mine et les Hommes association, showcasing the museum’s buildings, machinery, and facilities, including underground galleries, surface installations such as the salle des pendus (miners’ changing room), lampisterie, headframe, machine room, and stables, essential to mining operations.

== See also ==
- Industrial heritage
- Mining
- History of coal mining
- List of museums in France
- Bourgogne-Franche-Comté
- Decize coal mine

== Bibliography ==
- Janniaud, R. (1986). "À Blanzy : le musée de la Mine, par l'association « La mine et les hommes »" [In Blanzy: The Mining Museum, by the Association "La Mine et les Hommes"]. Images de Saône-et-Loire (in French) (67): 3–5.
