= Black Band (anarchism) =

Anarchist miners' workers' organizations in Montceau-les-Mines, France

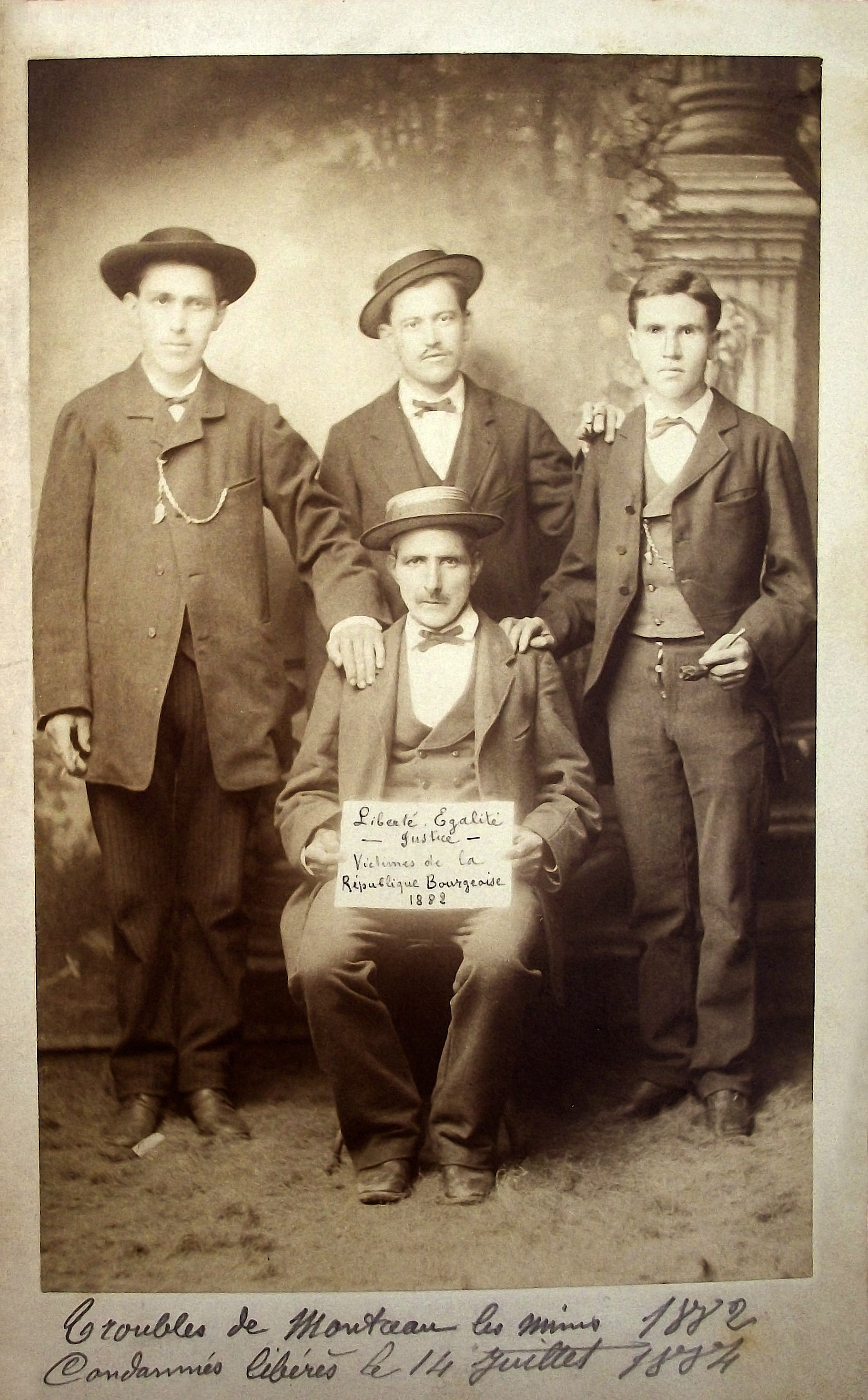
- Photograph of four Black Band members freed in 1884 after serving their sentence
- Leaders: Various anarchist and anarchist inspired miners
- Dates active: 1878-1885
- Active regions: Saône-et-Loire
- Ideology: Anarchism; Anti-clericalism
- Political position: Far-left
- Status: Defunct
- Size: Hundreds (?) / 10-20% of the miner population of Montceau-les-Mines (?)

The Black Band or the Black Bands ('La Bande noire') is the name given to one or various anarchist and anarchist-inspired miners' workers' organizations and groups present in the Montceau-les-Mines-Le Creusot region and more generally the whole Saône-et-Loire mining basin during the Montceau-les-Mines troubles, of which they were main actors.

These groups operated autonomously and used political violence in the form of bomb attacks, arson, riots, armed assaults, shootings, and other insurrectionary methods against both symbolic and personal targets, aiming at individuals or symbols linked to the region's employers and the Catholic Church, which was seen as deeply connected to the interests of the employers and the State.

Most of the attacks took place between August 1882 and 1885, although actions dating back to 1878 might be linked to these groups, following the dismissal of Republican miners by an employer who had just lost an election and the ensuing repression—which led a number of miners to radicalize and join them. The origin of the name is poorly known; it might have been an allusion to their nocturnal meetings. The political violence especially escalated after 1882. Infiltrated, the Black Bands disappeared in 1885 following, notably, the trap set by the police on 7 November 1884, which led to the arrest of dozens of militants and the trial of thirty-two defendants on 26 May 1885.

After the Thiers statue bombing in 1881, a failed attempt to destroy its target, the Black Bands were among the first groups in France and in history to make use of the strategy of propaganda of the deed, carrying out dozens of actions of that nature.

== History ==
=== Context and founding ===
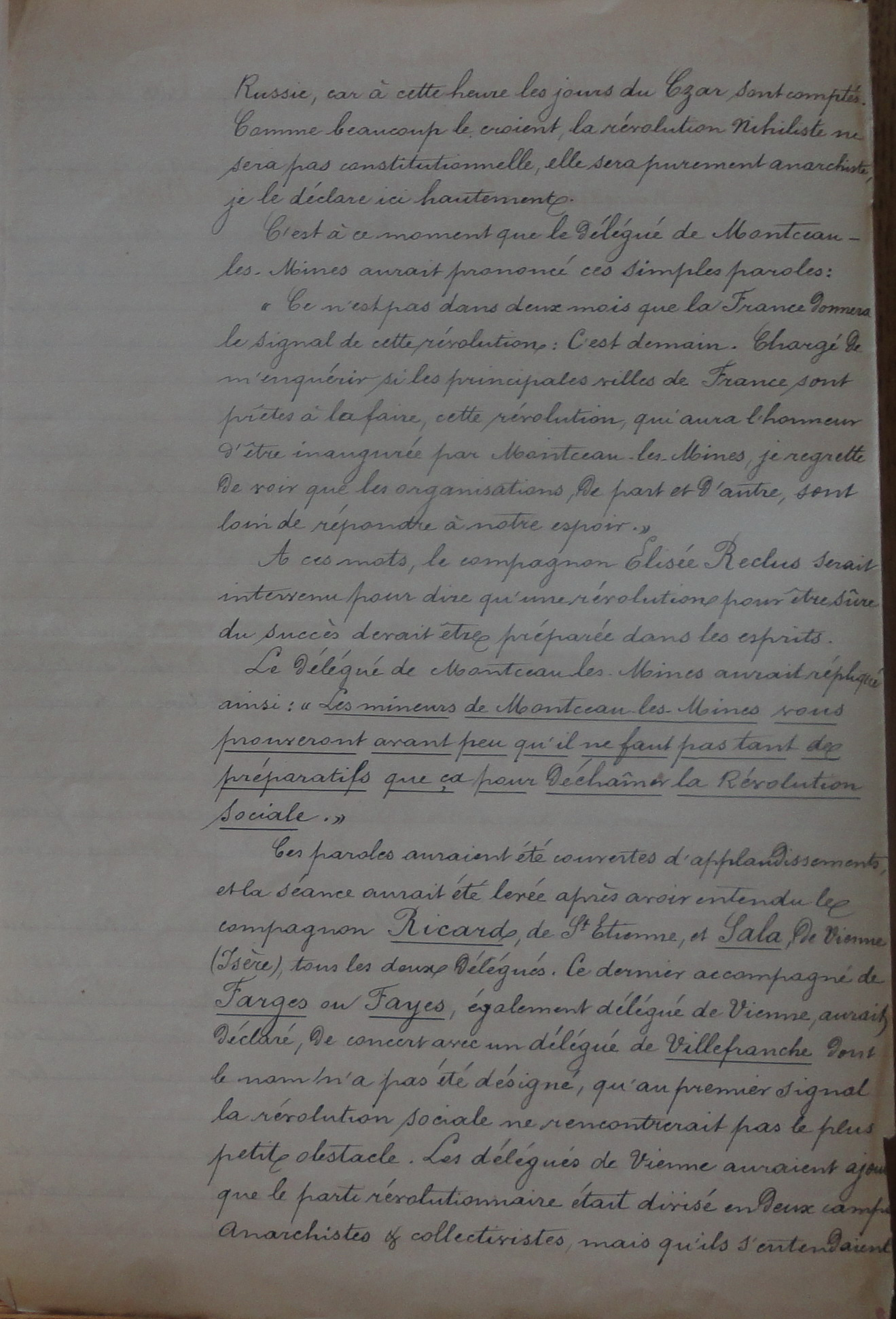
Report on the statements of a miners' delegate from Montceau-les-Mines who met members of the Jura Federation in Geneva a few days before the start of the movement and ensured them that Montceau-les-Mines was ready to launch the revolution 'tomorrow' (courtesy of Archives Anarchistes)

In the January 1878 elections, Doctor Jeannin, a republican, was elected Mayor of Montceau-les-Mines against Léonce Chagot, the outgoing mayor and director of the mining company. The disappointment was great for the latter, and fifteen workers, all republicans, were fired. Tempers flared, and on 27 February 1878, a strike broke out: gendarmes intervened, the clashes were violent, and a patrol was even targeted by pistol shots. Twenty-six miners were then arrested and two hundred were fired, and the strike ended on 11 March 1878. These events, according to the historian Jean Maitron, were at the origin of the organization's creation.

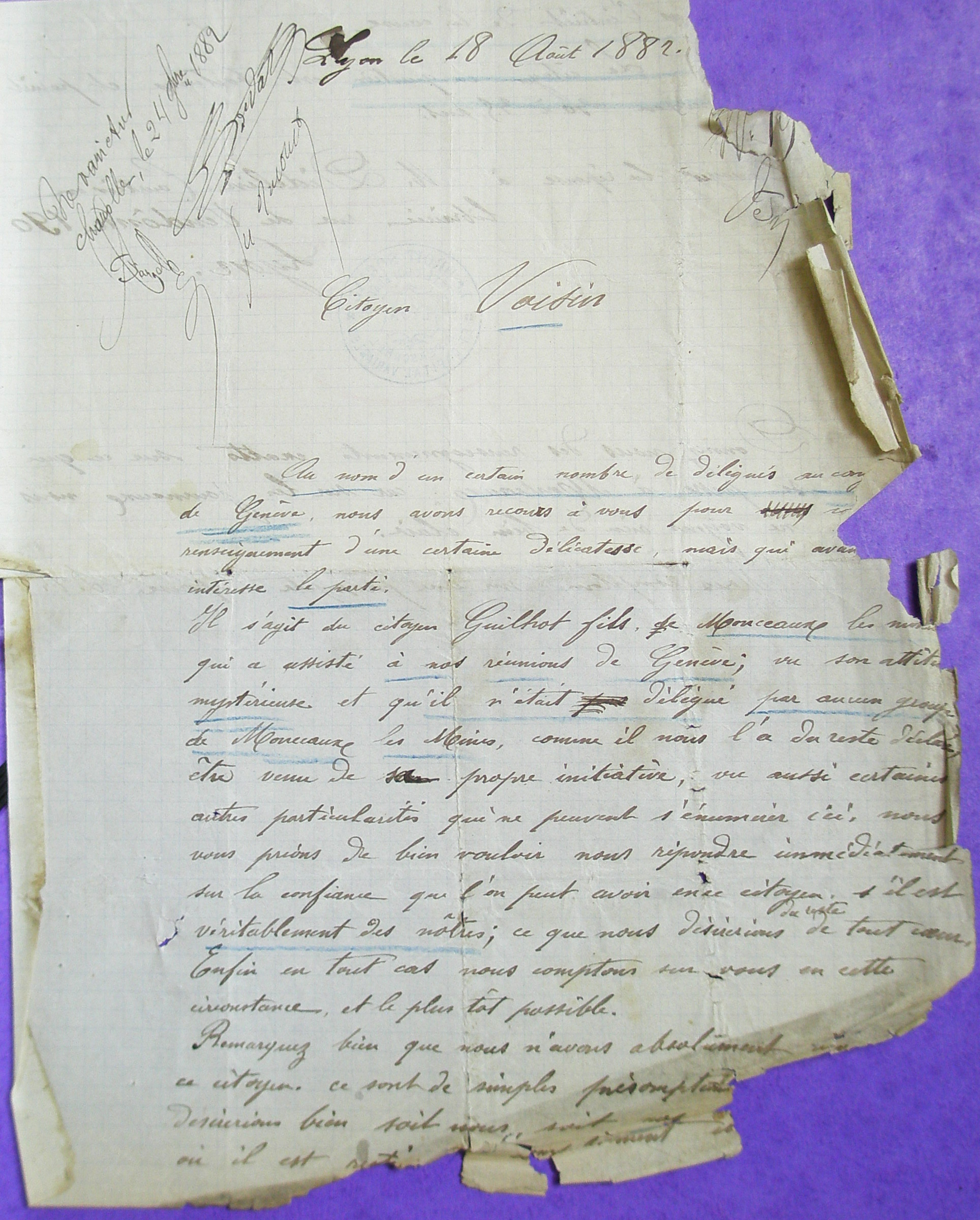
Nicolas Didelin (cousin of Louise Michel) writing to Charles Voisin to have intel on the Montceau delegate and assess his reliability (courtesy of Archives Anarchistes)

During the same period, the clergy, generally from the Charolais countryside, was heavily criticised. Indeed, coming from a fundamentally Christian region, its members seemed ill at ease in a working-class environment where few attended church, and, according to some residents, showed excessive zeal. Priest Gauthier, serving in the Bois du Verne (a district of Montceau-les-Mines), the Marist brothers, and the sisters of the congregational schools were notably the targets of numerous criticisms, such as participating in clerical oppression, particularly through surveillance, targeting the workers and maintained by Jules Chagot, and then by his nephew and successor Léonce Chagot.

Since meetings of more than twenty people had been banned since 1810, various workers' organizations began meeting secretly in the woods and cabarets.

The functioning of the local workers' organizations, at least during the 1878–1882 period, seems to have its origins in the republican secret societies of the 19th century. For example, a gendarmerie report from Montceau-les-Mines indicates that: 'the external signs (winking, handshake) used by the members are those of Freemasonry'. The cult of secrecy, extravagant initiation narratives, and a hierarchy within the bands seem to confirm the connection to this ideal.

One of these secret societies seems to have played a very important role. Called La Marianne and established in the working-class district of Bois-du-Verne, it was nicknamed the 'Black Band' by the gendarmerie as early as 1879. According to the authorities, it was composed of 'young people, a number of whom have had dealings with the ordinary police or correctional police, men quite old, 40 or 45 years old, fathers, several old-timers [claiming connection to] the Great International'. It laid the groundwork for the workers' organizations in Montceau-les-Mines.

In 1881, an organization called the Black Band was founded by a Montceau worker; it took on the status of the South-East Socialist Association and claimed to support workers in their demands against employers.

Meeting at night in the woods or at wine merchants', they took the name 'Black Band' and multiplied the dynamiting. They set fire to a chapel, blew up calvaries and crosses, attacked the homes of 'master miners' and sent threatening letters to magistrates. Rejecting the reformism of the trade unions, they were thus among the first to implement the 'propaganda of the deed' that anarchist theorists like Peter Kropotkin were formulating at the same time.

=== Actions ===
==== 1882 ====
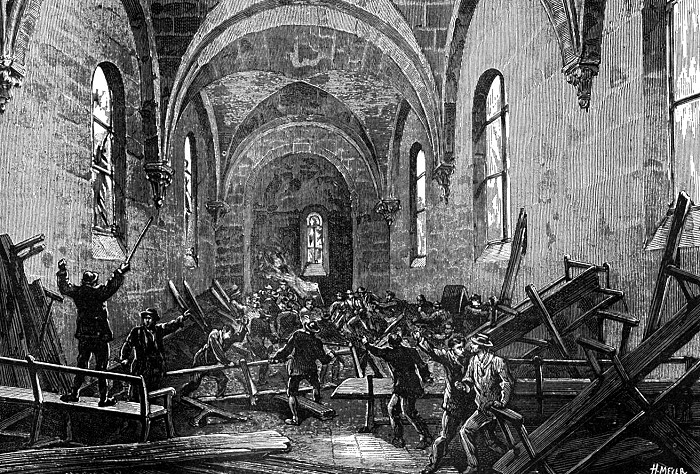
Black Band rioting inside the Bois-du-Verne chapel (15 August 1882)

The first attacks of the Black Band were tinged with a radical anticlericalism: on 18 June 1882, altars of repose prepared for a procession were thrown into a pond, and then in August 1882, attacks were perpetrated, notably in the chapel of a religious school, against the sisters' school in a hamlet near Montceau-les-Mines, as well as against the Bois-du-Verne church. During this same month of August, various crosses were destroyed in the districts of Bois du Verne, Les Alouettes, and Bois Roulot. These actions followed a turbulent year between the Black Band and an eminent member of the local clergy close to Jules Chagot. According to the historian Roger Marchandeau, Priest Gauthier 'tried to combat the Black Band by spying on the inhabitants and denouncing them to the Company's management. On his terrible black notebook, he constantly wrote down the names of miners who refused to accept the master's domination'. This attitude earned him numerous threats which were the first actions claimed by the Black Band.

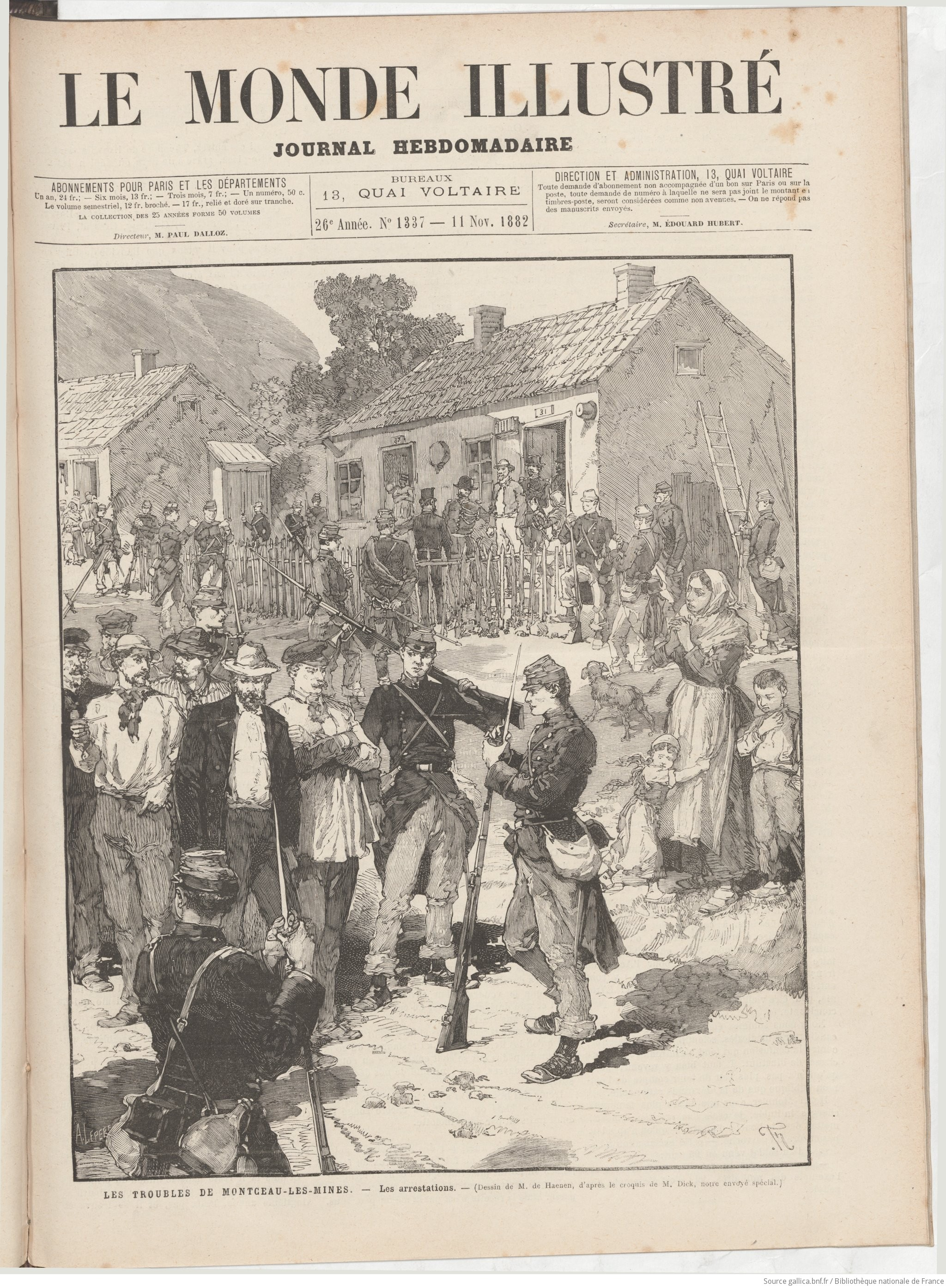
French army arresting suspected Black Band members in Montceau-les-Mines, front page of Le Monde illustré (11 November 1882)

On 15 August 1882, a riot by sympathizers and members of the Black Band broke out, with two hundred to five hundred miners, out of a population of three thousand workers, participating. An armoury was looted by the Bois-du-Verne band and the weapons (mainly revolvers) were redistributed to the demonstrators. The Bois-du-Verne chapel was attacked, the entrance rose window was destroyed by a bomb, the building was ransacked, and then set on fire. Later that night, the windowpanes and the vestibule door of the sisters' school were broken after rioters had entered.

The very next day, the authorities proceeded with numerous arrests which would lead to the first trial of the Black Bands in December 1882. The workers questioned following these events highlighted clerical pressure to justify their actions, as seven miners had been dismissed from their jobs following demonstrations of hostility against the priest during a funeral. Despite about thirty arrests, notably of members of the Santa-Maria trade union and the presence of four hundred soldiers from the 134th Infantry Regiment, secret meetings continued to take place in the following months. The Journal du Cher, on 22 August 1882, described one meeting: 'The band was composed for the most part, [...] of young people from fifteen to twenty years old. All were more or less disguised. Some had their faces smeared with black, others wore false beards, and others finally had put on women's clothing. Some were armed with rifles and revolvers; others, with scythes, pitchforks, and clubs. A certain discipline reigned among them, and the chiefs' orders were carried out militarily'. A meeting of two hundred individuals was notably reported in Montceau-les-Mines on 27 August 1882.

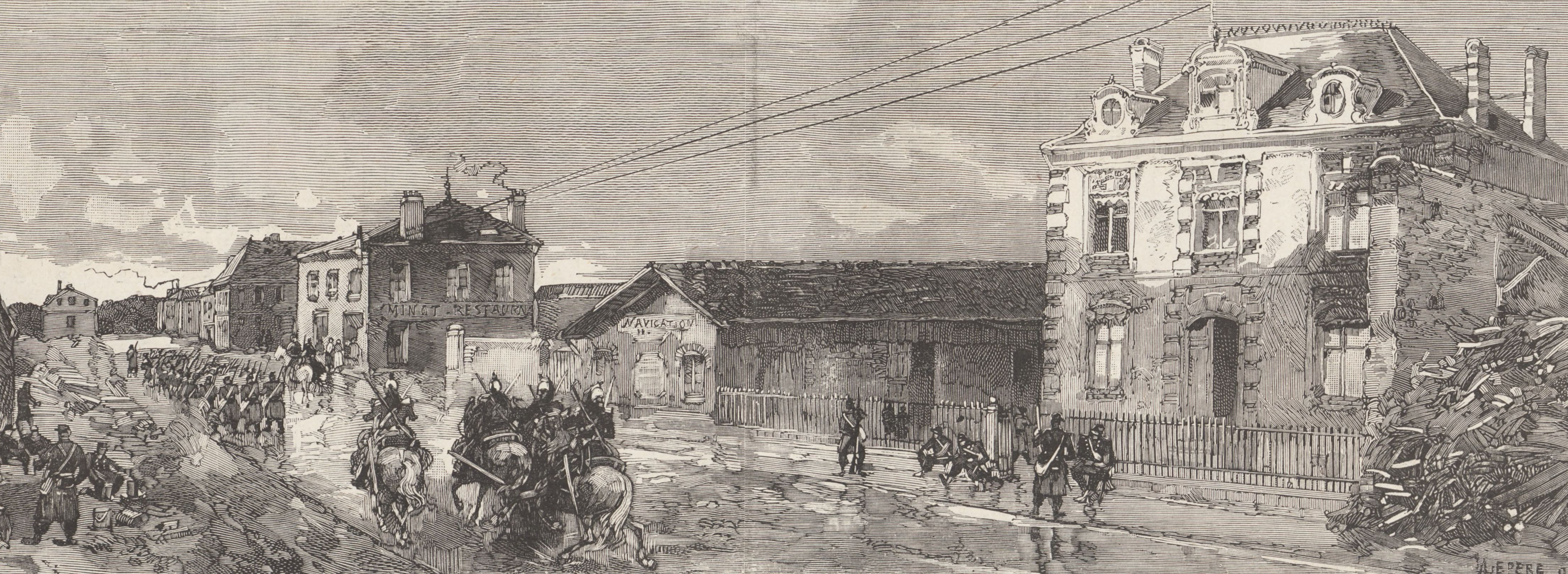
French army occupying Montceau-les-Mines in response to the Black Band, Le Monde illustré (18 November 1882)

It was after this riot that a radicalisation was observed: first with a multiplication of threatening letters, mainly against master miners, but also with the increase in the felling of crosses, and starting in October 1882 with the near-systematic use of dynamite with the goal of targeting individuals.

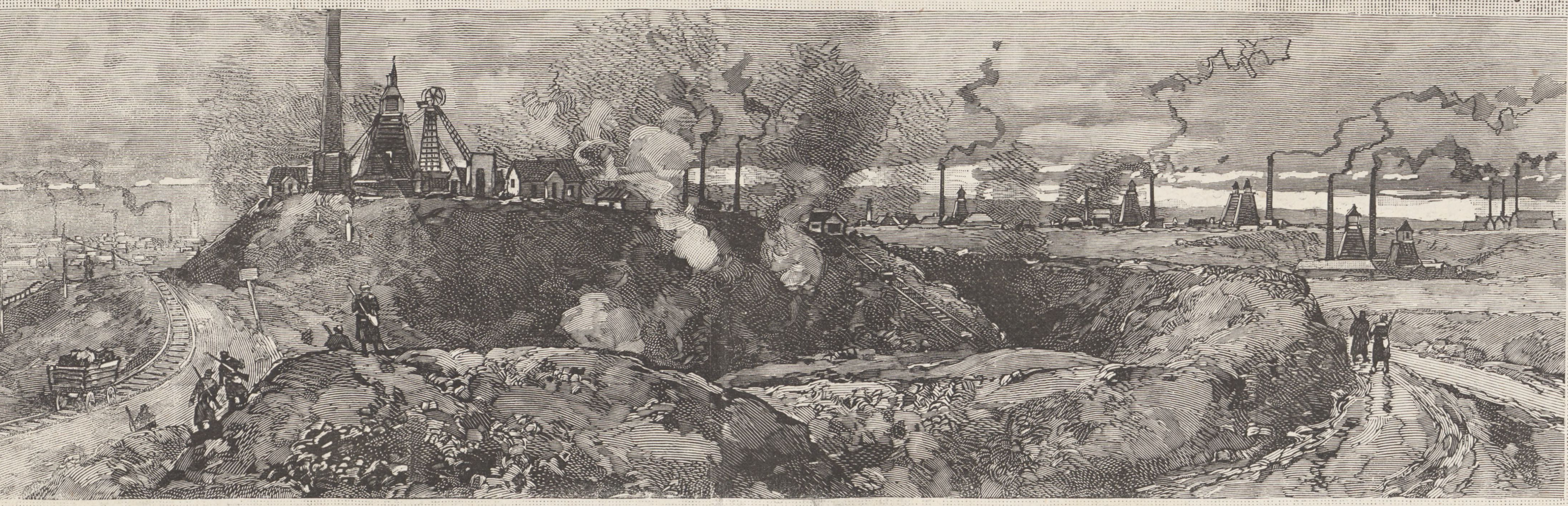
French army occupying Montceau-les-Mines in response to the Black Band, Le Monde illustré (18 November 1882)

Although primarily targeting religious symbols, the organisation nonetheless seems to have been more largely motivated by anarchist and anti-capitalist ideas, as shown by this communiqué addressed to L'Étendard révolutionnaire in September 1882:

The newspapers of the Republican reaction are filling their columns with hateful diatribes against 'the Black Band' which has just launched the first spark of the very-soon social revolution. These newspapers pretend to take us for clericals, for agents of Bonapartism, us who have blown up churches and madonnas, and who execrate despotisms in whatever form they present themselves: Caesarism, divine right, Orleanism, or republican monarchism. This word 'Black Band' has left the door open to their hypocrisies and lies. Well! We come to tell them right to their face, so they can no longer plead ignorance: the 'Black Band' is the 'Band of Misery', the black flag we have raised is the flag of hunger, of strike, of all-out struggle on the ground of the social revolution, of the annihilation of capital, of employers, of the exploitation of man by man. And tell them well, companions, that despite the persecution that crushes us, despite the soldiers of the empire, the lackeys of the empire, we are ready to raise our flag again tomorrow until victory has crowned our efforts and our sacrifices! Long live the Social Revolution!

On 18 October 1882, the first trial of the members of the Black Band opened before the Cour d’assises of Saône-et-Loire in Mâcon, where twenty-three suspects were then tried for the acts committed during the riot of 15 August 1882. But after six days of hearings, following threats against the Attorney General and the bombing of the Bellecour Theatre restaurant in Lyon on 22 October 1882, the trial was postponed. It was then decided that the second trial would take place in December 1882 before the Assize Court of Puy-de-Dôme in Riom. On 23 December 1882, the verdict was delivered; the accusations of theft, carrying weapons during an insurrectional movement, invasion of inhabited buildings, and illegal arrests were upheld: Devillard received five years of imprisonment; Viennet three years, Juillet, Garnier, Loriot, and Demesples two years; Château, Chofflet, and Spenlhauer one year. Bonnot and fourteen others were acquitted.

==== 1883 ====
In 1883, groups claiming to be part of the Black Band reformed, one of which was led by the labourer François Jambon and the miner Émile Hériot, who went to Villefranche-sur-Saône in February 1883 and brought back rifle caps (also called primers). From that moment on, the targets primarily became informers who provided information to the police, such as when on 23 February 1883, a dynamite explosion blew out the window of a miner's house, or on 23 April 1883, when a bomb exploded at another miner's house in Mont-Saint-Vincent. Similarly, people considered bourgeois, or perceived as close to this social class, were targeted. On 12 May, 10 June, and 30 October, the engineer Michalowski, who had agreed to conduct an expert assessment of suspicious explosions for the Charolles prosecutor's office in February 1883, had his bedroom dynamited three times, but he escaped each time.

Secret meetings were still taking place, as when on 29 July 1883, about a hundred miners met at the place called La Croix des Mâts between Le Creusot and Montceau-les-Mines to discuss wage increases and working time reduction, but without reaching an agreement. In November 1883, several newspapers indicated the presence in Montceau-les-Mines of anarchists known for travelling across France to carry out propaganda.

==== 1884 ====
Following the theft of 45 kg of explosives and 210 m of fuse in July in Perrecy-les-Forges by members of the Black Band, and under the impetus of several groups, the dynamiting resumed. People accused of collusion with the local authorities were still targeted, such as on 13 August 1884, when the house of the engineer Louis Chevallier, second-in-command to the Director of the Perrecy-les-Forges mines, who was accused of using harsh words with the miners, was dynamited. The windows of many nearby houses were shattered due to the power of the explosion; Louis Chevallier was only slightly injured, but his wife was severely wounded in the head. Or on 14 August 1884, when the house of the Mayor of Sanvignes-les-Mines, François Grelin, was targeted by a bottle containing explosives and lead bullets that was thrown through a glass door.

In September 1884, the Magny chapel was the victim of multiple dynamite attacks, which seems to indicate that the Black Band's actions were, at least still partly, directed against the local clergy.

These actions stopped abruptly on 7 November 1884, following a trap set by the gendarmerie and an informer named Brenin. The person, named Gueslaff, who was supposed to plant a bomb, then shot at two gendarmes and the maréchal des logis (sergeant), all three of whom were seriously injured. Gueslaff was arrested and denounced numerous members of the Black Band.

Following this, and despite several arrests, the Black Band continued to be talked about. Future reprisal actions were announced via posters, and meetings continued, according to some newspapers, to be organised.

==== 1885 ====
Following the failed bombing in November 1884 and the subsequent arrests, the trial took place in May 1885. During it, thirty-two accused were judged: Gueslaff the shooter was sentenced to ten years of forced labour, Brenin the informer to five years, and eight other members were sentenced to terms ranging from four years in prison to twenty years of forced labour. Twenty-two accused were finally acquitted, notably Dessolin who would found the first Montceau 'yellow union' in 1899. Following these heavy sentences, the Black Bands were much less spoken of.

In the same year, Black Bands attempted to reform. Formed in May, according to the authorities, of two groups of eighteen men in Le Creusot and five in Montceau-les-Mines, several meetings then took place, but the different groups never managed to coordinate. Many sympathizers were also present in Montchanin and tried to organise themselves.

The mining basin then witnessed its last anarchist attacks. Notably on 7 January, when a bomb exploded against the offices of the Montchanin tile factory, on 10 January, when a charge detonated in the courtyard of the presbytery in Sanvignes-les-Mines, or on 11 January, when a nun in charge of the tile factory school discovered an explosive device that caused only a small detonation. The last major meetings took place during the summer, and on 20 October, the last attack occurred at the home of Anne Vannier, the wife of the informer Brenin.

== Bibliography ==
- Beaubernard, R. (1981), Montceau-les-Mines. Un «laboratoire social» au XIXe siècle, Avallon: Éditions de Civry, ISBN 2-85983-024-3
- Maitron, Jean (1955), Histoire du mouvement anarchiste en France (1800-1914) (in French), Paris: Histoire du mouvement anarchiste en France, 1880-1914
- Meunier, Yves (2017), La Bande noire - Propagande par le fait dans le bassin minier (1878–1885), Paris: L'Echappée
