= Thiers statue bombing =

1881 anarchist bombing in France

- Part of Propaganda of the deed
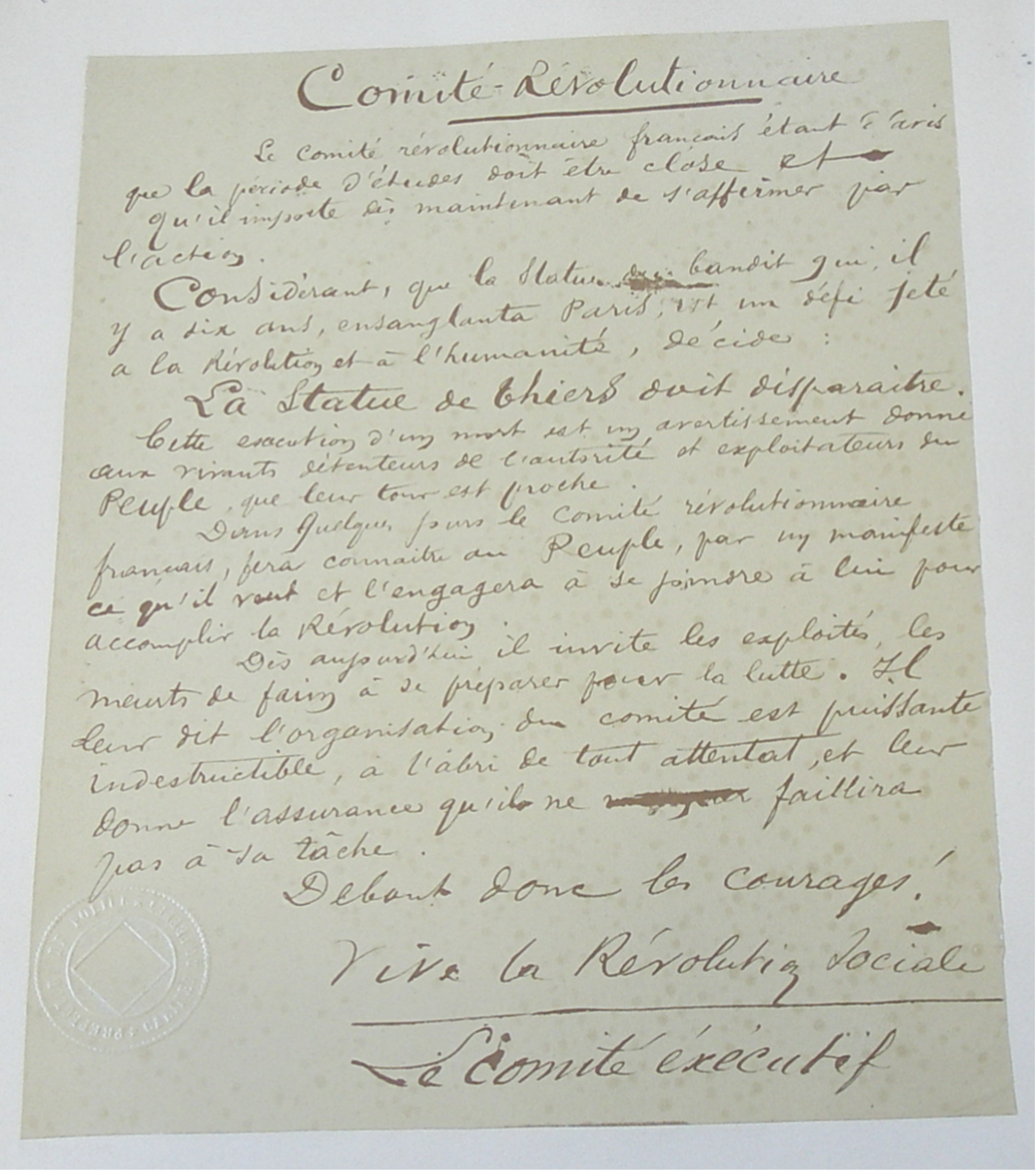
- Manifesto found at the foot of the statue (Archives of the Paris Police Prefecture, Ba 138 / courtesy of Archives Anarchistes)
- Location: 48°53′53″N 2°05′41″E; Saint-Germain-en-Laye, France
- Date: 16 June 1881
- Deaths: 0
- Injuries: 0
- Perpetrator: Comité révolutionnaire français
- Motive: Anarchism

The Thiers statue bombing, also known as the Saint-Germain-en-Laye bombing, was an anarchist bomb attack carried out on the night of 15–16 June 1881, against the statue of Adolphe Thiers in Saint-Germain-en-Laye, France. With the dozens of attacks of the Black Band the following year, it was one of the first clear propaganda of the deed attacks in France.

A Comité révolutionnaire français ('French Revolutionary Committee') placed bombs in small boxes around the statue of Adolphe Thiers – a significant political figure and responsible for the massacres of the Paris Commune ten years prior. The group also left a manifesto next to the statue. The bombs exploded but malfunctioned, merely leaving a mark on the back of the statue. One month later, several anarchists approved propaganda of the deed as a favored strategy in the London Congress.

According to the Prefect of Police of Paris, Louis Andrieux, he was allegedly aware of the attack but would have chosen to let it happen to prevent anarchists from targeting the Chamber of Deputies. The manifesto published by the group is considered significant for explaining the shift occurring at the time from classic iconoclastic terrorist violence to the new form of terrorism induced by propaganda of the deed.

== History ==
=== Context ===
In the 19th century, anarchism emerged and took shape in Europe before spreading. Anarchists advocated a struggle against all forms of domination perceived as unjust including economic domination brought forth by capitalism. They were particularly opposed to the State, seen as the organization that legitimized a good number of these dominations through its police, army and propaganda.

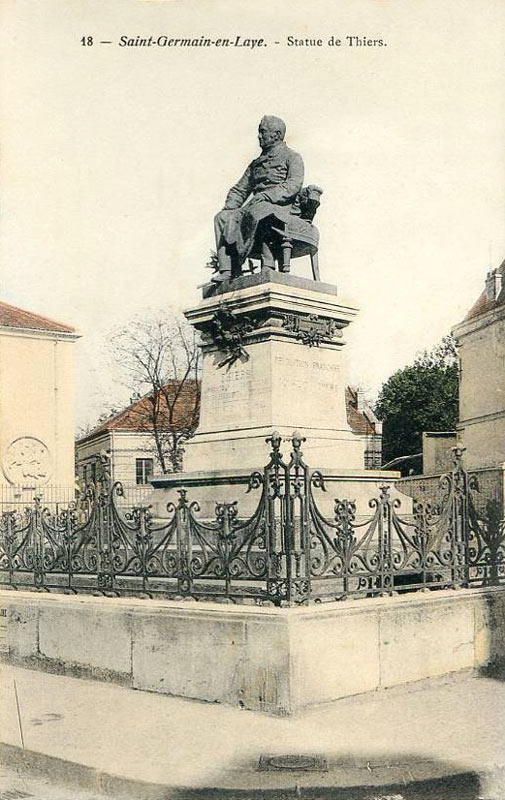
Statue of Adolphe Thiers in Saint-Germain-en-Laye, before 1918, FICEDL collections. (demolished during Nazi occupation of France)

In the late 1870s, anarchists developed the strategy of propaganda by the deed, aiming to convey anarchist ideas directly through action, without relying on discourse. Figures in the anarchist movement such as Peter Kropotkin, Errico Malatesta, Andrea Costa, and Carlo Cafiero extensively developed this strategy. In 1879, it was adopted by the congress of the Jura Federation in La Chaux-de-Fonds. In 1880, it was discussed in Vevey during a meeting that produced a Charter of propaganda by the deed, which was adopted the following year by the first exclusively anarchist congress in France, the Paris congress, in May 1881.

Furthermore, Adolphe Thiers, a conservative French politician who served multiple times as minister and was a significant political figure since the July Monarchy (1830–1848), was primarily responsible for the repression of the Paris Commune and the Semaine sanglante ('Bloody Week') (1871). In 1880, a statue in his honor was inaugurated by French authorities in Saint-Germain-en-Laye.

=== Bombing ===
On the night of 15 to 16 June 1881, at precisely 2:58 AM, a series of explosions occurred near the statue, creating a significant commotion. When the town's police commissioner arrived on the scene, he found that the statue was not destroyed. There was a bluish mark covering the back of the chair where Thiers was seated, along with several containers holding explosives, ranging from a scrap metal box to small receptacles three centimeters in diameter. The explosives used were not dynamite but other types.

=== Aftermath ===
French police stationed guards around the statue to prevent a similar attack from recurring. Authorities found a manifesto next to the statue, signed by a Comité révolutionnaire français ('French Revolutionary Committee').

According to Police Prefect Louis Andrieux in his Memoirs four years later, that he published in 1885 while running for office in elections, he would have been perfectly aware of the attack but would have allowed it to proceed to save the Chamber of Deputies from future alleged anarchist attacks. This analysis is supported by Jean Maitron, Uri Eisenzweig, and Richard Bach Jensen, who also rely on Maitron and Andrieux's testimony.

It may be interesting to note that in 1881, while anarchists in Germany had already carried out numerous acts of propaganda by the deed, this was not the case in France. One month after this event, the London Congress was due to be held and validate the strategy of propaganda by the deed. It is perhaps notable that anarchists in France carried out an attack shortly before this gathering.

== Analysis ==
=== Manifesto ===
The manifesto from this attack, which is considered one of the first propaganda by the deed attacks, is analyzed by Eisenzweig as presenting numerous perspectives that foreshadow the advent of the "new violence" characteristic of these emerging forms of terrorism. He also implicitly links it to anarchism, even though the term isn't explicit in the manifesto's text. Eisenzweig writes about the manifesto and the significance of the attack:

This paradoxical semantic logic [...] was already at play before the ère des attentats properly speaking. [...] The attack (attentat) on the Thiers statue in 1881 is undoubtedly its very first manifestation and, as such, perhaps the most illuminating, as the shift in meaning from the act itself to the discourse it refers to occurs, as it were, before our eyes. [...] And indeed, even as it attempted to 'explain' the Saint-Germain[-en-Laye] attack, the accompanying text would paradoxically initiate a divorce from the iconoclastic heritage, in the form of a displacement of meaning outside the object, outside the symbol itself. [...] In other words, the strictly physical aspect of the violence was destined to fade here, if not to be annulled in favor of a meaning posited as being elsewhere [...] that is to say, in a reality that still belonged only to a project or a prophecy.

== Primary sources ==
=== Manifesto (from the police archives) ===
- Manifesto of the attack (original version in French)
- Translated Manifesto on The Anarchist Library

=== Police archives ===
Collection of the site-archive Archives Anarchistes uploaded to Commons comprising:

- Ba 138 — 1881 Thiers statue bombing (42 pages) (Archives de la préfecture de police de Paris)

== Bibliography ==
- Bach Jensen, Richard (2015). The Battle against Anarchist Terrorism: An International History, 1878–1934. Cambridge: Cambridge University Press (CUP). ISBN 978-1-107-03405-1.
- Eisenzweig, Uri (2001). Fictions de l'anarchisme [Fictions of anarchism] (in French). France: C. Bourgois. ISBN 2-267-01570-6.
- Jourdain, Edouard (2013). L'anarchisme [Anarchism]. Paris: La Découverte. ISBN 978-2-7071-9091-8.
- Ward, Colin (2004). Anarchism: A Very Short Introduction. Oxford University Press (OUP).
