= Anarchism in Italy =

Italian anarchism (Italian: anarchismo) as a movement began primarily from the influence of Mikhail Bakunin, Giuseppe Fanelli, Carlo Cafiero, and Errico Malatesta. Rooted in collectivist anarchism and social or socialist anarchism, it expanded to include illegalist individualist anarchism, mutualism, anarcho-syndicalism, and especially anarcho-communism. In fact, anarcho-communism first fully formed into its modern strain within the Italian section of the First International. Italian anarchism and Italian anarchists participated in the biennio rosso and survived Italian Fascism, with Italian anarchists significantly contributing to the Italian Resistance Movement. Platformism and insurrectionary anarchism have long been particularly common in Italian anarchism and continue to influence the movement today. The synthesist Italian Anarchist Federation and insurrectionary Informal Anarchist Federation appeared after the war, and autonomismo and operaismo especially influenced Italian anarchism in the second half of the 20th century.

== History ==
=== Origins ===
When the Italian section of the International Workingman's Association was formed in 1869, new and more famous (or infamous) anarchists began appearing on the scene, notable individuals include Carlo Cafiero and Errico Malatesta. Within the Italian section of the IWMA, the ideas of anarchist communism as a clear, cohesive movement were formed. At an 1876 conference in Florence, the Italian section of the International Workingmen's Association declared the principles of Anarchist-Communism, proclaiming:

The Italian Federation considers the collective property of the products of labour as the necessary complement to the collectivist programme, the aid of all for the satisfaction of the needs of each being the only rule of production and consumption which corresponds to the principle of solidarity. The federal congress at Florence has eloquently demonstrated the opinion of the Italian International on this point...

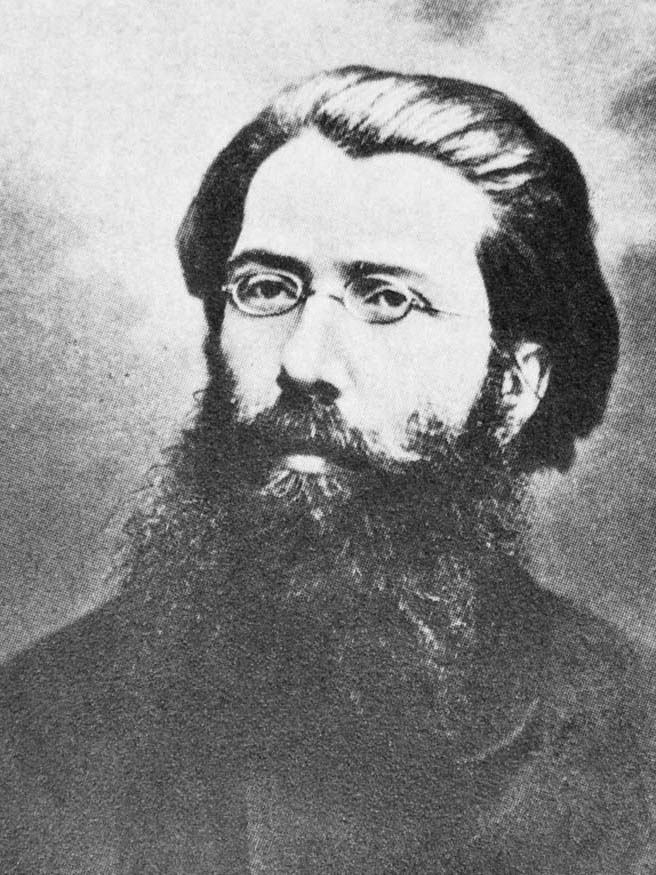
Carlo Cafiero

It was also in Italy that early Anarchist attempts at revolution began. Bakunin was involved in an insurrection taking place in Florence in 1869 and in the failed 1874 Bologna insurrection. In 1877, Errico Malatesta, Carlo Cafiero, and Costa began an attempt at revolution in Italy with the Banda del Matese. They liberated two villages in Campania before being put down by the military.

Italian Anarchism was first materialized in the Italian section of the First International. The popularity of the IWA skyrocketed with the Paris Commune. Because of limited knowledge of the actual events taking place, many militants had utopian visions of the nature of the Commune, leading to popularity of Anarchist and other Socialist ideas. The radical republican Giuseppe Mazzini condemned the Commune because it represented everything he hated: class struggle, mass violence, atheism, and materialism. Mazzini's condemnation helped to increase the defection of many republicans to the ranks of the IWA.

As the split between Marx and Bakunin became more prominent, the Italian section of the IWA primarily took the side of Bakunin against the authoritarian behaviour of Marx's General Council. Bakunin's defence of the Paris Commune against the attacks of Mazzini and Marx and Engels's incompetence in challenging them led to Bakuninism becoming the prominent strain of thought in the Italian IWA. In 1872, Bakunin, and Cafiero helped to organize a national federation of Italian IWA sections. All the delegates at the founding congress excluding Carlo Terzaghi (a police spy) and two Garibaldian socialists, were Anarchists.

=== Errico Malatesta ===
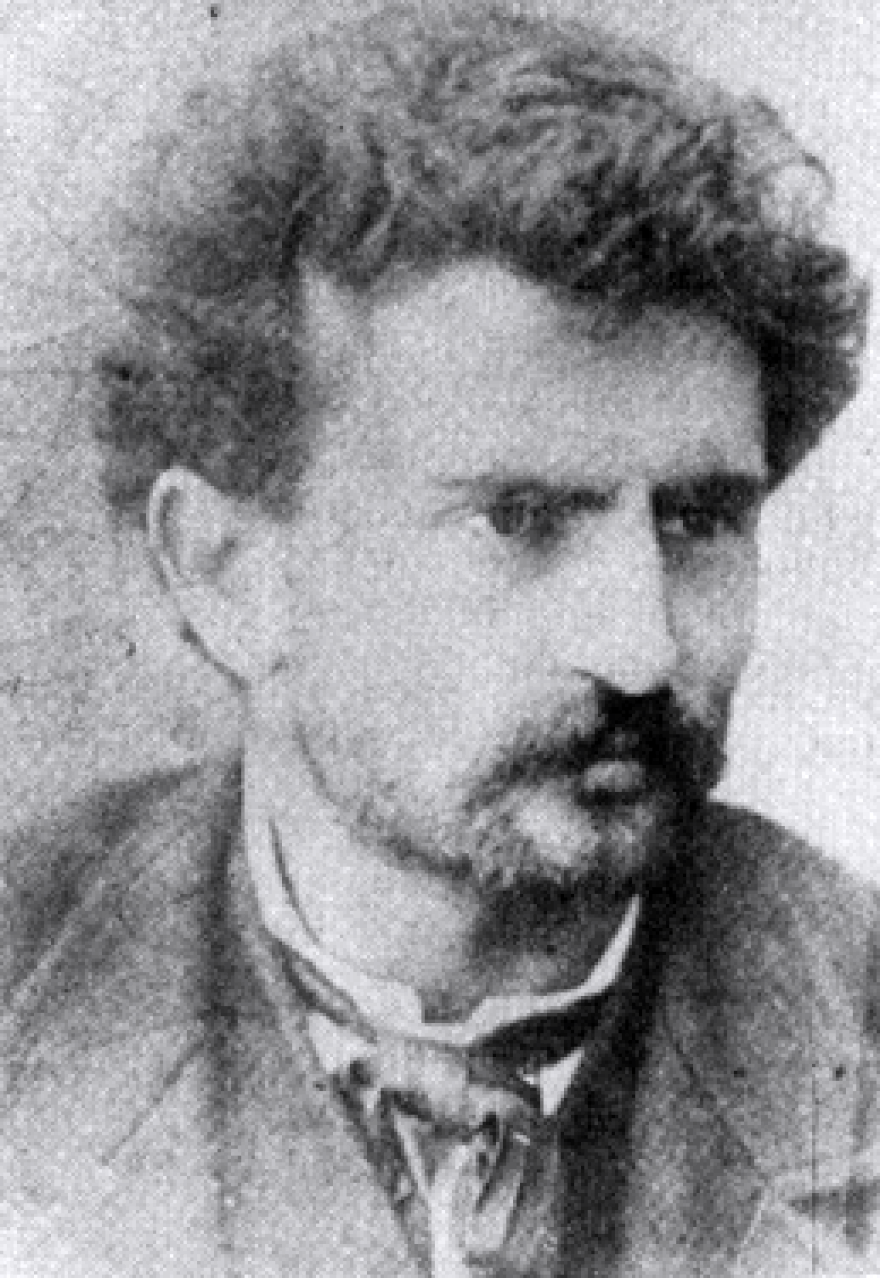
Errico Malatesta

Errico Malatesta was an important Italian anarchist. He wrote and edited a number of radical newspapers and was also a friend of Mikhail Bakunin. Partly via his enthusiasm for the Paris Commune and partly via his friendship with Carmelo Palladino, he joined the Naples section of the International Workingmen's Association that same year, as well as teaching himself to be a mechanic and electrician. In 1872 he met Mikhail Bakunin, with whom he participated in the International's St. Imier Congress. For the next four years, Malatesta helped spread Internationalist propaganda in Italy; he was imprisoned twice for these activities.

In April 1877, Malatesta, Carlo Cafiero, the Russian Stepniak and about 30 others started an insurrection in the province of Benevento, taking the villages of Letino and Gallo without a struggle. The revolutionaries burned tax registers and declared the end of the King's reign, and were met with enthusiasm: even a local priest showed his support.

In Florence he founded the weekly anarchist paper La Questione Sociale (The Social Question) in which his most popular pamphlet, Fra Contadini (Among Farmers), first appeared. He lived in Buenos Aires from 1885, where he resumed publication of La Questione Sociale, and was involved in the founding of the first militant workers' union in Argentina, the Bakers Union, and left an anarchist impression in the workers' movements there for years to come.

Returning to Europe in 1889, he published a newspaper called L'Associazione in Nice until he was forced to flee to London. During this time he wrote several important pamphlets, including L'Anarchia. Malatesta then took part in the International Anarchist Congress of Amsterdam (1907), where he debated in particular with Pierre Monatte on the relation between anarchism and syndicalism (or trade-unionism).

After the First World War, Malatesta eventually returned to Italy for the final time. Two years after his return, in 1921, the Italian government imprisoned him, again, although he was released two months before the fascists came to power. From 1924 until 1926, when Benito Mussolini silenced all independent press, Malatesta published the journal Pensiero e Volontà, although he was harassed and the journal suffered from government censorship. He was to spend his remaining years leading a relatively quiet life, earning a living as an electrician. After years of suffering from a weak respiratory system and regular bronchial attacks, he developed bronchial pneumonia from which he died after a few weeks, despite being given 1500 litres of oxygen in his last five hours. He died on Friday, 22 July 1932.

=== The Socialist Revolutionary Anarchist Party ===
The Socialist Revolutionary Anarchist Party (Italian: Partito Socialista Anarchico Rivoluzionario) was a short-lived Italian political party.

Founded in January 1891 at the Capolago congress, at which around 80 delegates from Italian socialist and anarchist groups participated. Notable figures included, Errico Malatesta, Luigi Galleani, Amilcare Cipriani, Andrea Costa and Filippo Turati. Malatesta envisioned the PSAR as the Italian federation of a new, anarchist and socialist, International Workingmen's Association.

=== The founding of Unione Sindacale Italiana ===
Unione Sindacale Italiana is an Italian trade union that was founded in 1912, after a group of workers, previously affiliated with the Confederazione Generale del Lavoro (CGI), met in Modena and declared themselves linked to the legacy of the First International, and later joined the anarcho-syndicalist International Workers' Association (IWA; Associazione Internazionale dei Lavoratori in Italian or AIT – Asociación Internacional de los Trabajadores in the common Spanish reference).

The most left-wing camere del lavoro adhered in rapid succession to the USI, and it engaged in all major political battles for labour rights – without ever adopting the militarist attitudes present with other trade unions. Nonetheless, after the outbreak of World War I, USI was shaken by the dispute around the issue of Italy's intervention in the conflict on the Entente Powers' side. The problem was made acute by the presence of eminent pro-intervention, national-syndicalist voices inside the body: Alceste De Ambris, Filippo Corridoni, and, initially, Giuseppe Di Vittorio. The union managed to maintain its opposition to militarism, under the leadership of Armando Borghi and Alberto Meschi.

=== The Unione Anarchica Italiana and the biennio rosso ===
In the Italian events known as the biennio rosso the anarcho-syndicalist trade union Unione Sindacale Italiana "grew to 800,000 members and the influence of the Italian Anarchist Union (20,000 members plus Umanita Nova, its daily paper) grew accordingly ... Anarchists were the first to suggest occupying workplaces."

=== Individualist anarchism ===
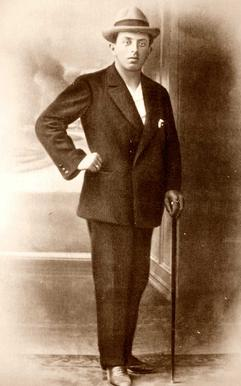
Renzo Novatore

Renzo Novatore was an important individualist anarchist who collaborated in numerous anarchist journals and participated in futurism avant-garde currents. Novatore collaborated in the individualist anarchist journal Iconoclasta! alongside the young Stirnerist illegalist Bruno Filippi Novatore belonged to the leftist section of the avant-garde movement of Futurism alongside other individualist anarcho-futurists such as Dante Carnesecchi, Leda Rafanelli, Auro d'Arcola, and Giovanni Governato.

Pietro Bruzzi published the journal L'Individualista in the 1920s alongside Ugo Fedeli and Francesco Ghezzi but who fell to fascist forces later. Pietro Bruzzi also collaborated with the Italian American individualist anarchist publication Eresia of New York City edited by Enrico Arrigoni.

=== The Fascist regime and afterwards ===
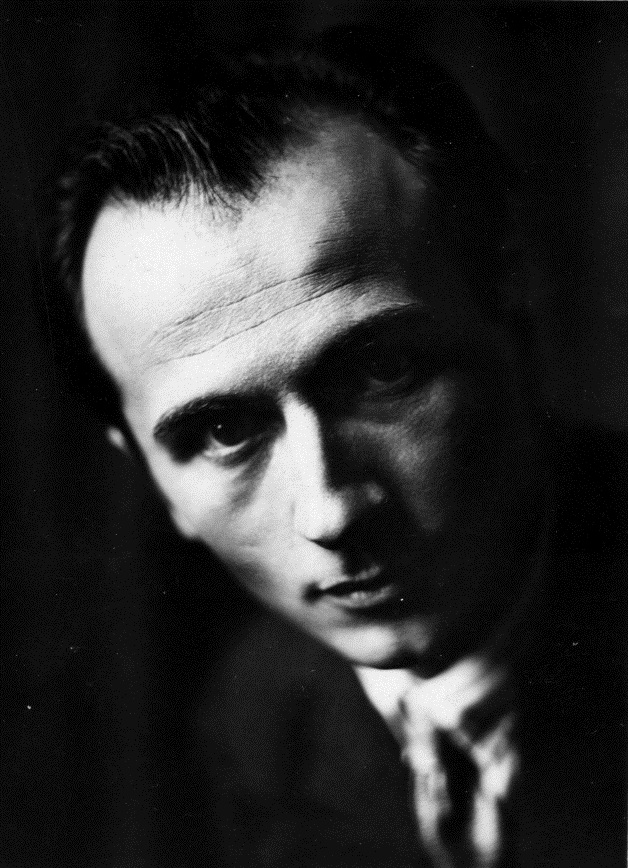
Camillo Berneri, Italian anarchist antifascist

When the war ended, USI peaked in numbers (it was during this time that it joined the IWA, becoming known as the USI-AIT). It became a major opponent of Benito Mussolini and the Fascist regime, fighting street battles with the Blackshirts – culminating in the August 1922 riots of Parma, when the USI-AIT faced Italo Balbo and his Arditi.

USI-AIT was outlawed by Mussolini in 1926, but resumed its activities in clandestinity and exile. It fought against Francisco Franco in the Spanish Civil War, alongside the Confederación Nacional del Trabajo and Federación Anarquista Ibérica, and took part in the Spanish Revolution. After World War II and the proclamation of the Republic, former members of the union followed the guidelines of the Federazione Anarchica Italiana that called for the creation of a unitary movement, and joined the Confederazione Generale Italiana del Lavoro (CGIL).

The prominent Italian anarchist Camillo Berneri, who volunteered to fight against Franco was killed instead in Spain by gunmen associated with the Communist Party of Spain.

=== Postwar years and today ===
In the immediate postwar years there existed failed attempts at a resurgence of anarcho-syndicalism.

Inside the FAI a tendency grouped as Gruppi Anarchici d'Azione Proletaria (GAAP – Anarchist Groups of Proletarian Action) led by Pier Carlo Masini was founded which "proposed a Libertarian Party with an anarchist theory and practice adapted to the new economic, political and social reality of post-war Italy, with an internationalist outlook and effective presence in the workplaces... The GAAP allied themselves with a similar development within the French Anarchist movement, the Federation Communiste Libertaire, whose leading light was Georges Fontenis."

Another tendency which didn't identify either with the more classical FAI or with the GAAP started to emerge as local groups. These groups emphasized direct action, informal affinity groups and expropriation for financing anarchist activity. From within these groups the influential insurrectionary anarchist Alfredo Maria Bonanno will emerge influenced by the practice of the Spanish exiled anarchist Josep Lluís i Facerias.

In the IX Congress of the Italian Anarchist Federation in Carrara, 1965 a group decided to split off from this organization and creates the Gruppi di Iniziativa Anarchica which was mostly composed of individualist anarchists who disagreed with important aspects of the "Associative Pact" and was critical of anarcho-syndicalism. The GIA published the bi-weekly L'Internazionale. Another group split off from the Anarchist Federation and regrouped as Gruppi Anarchici Federati. The GAF later started publishing Interrogations and A Rivista Anarchica.

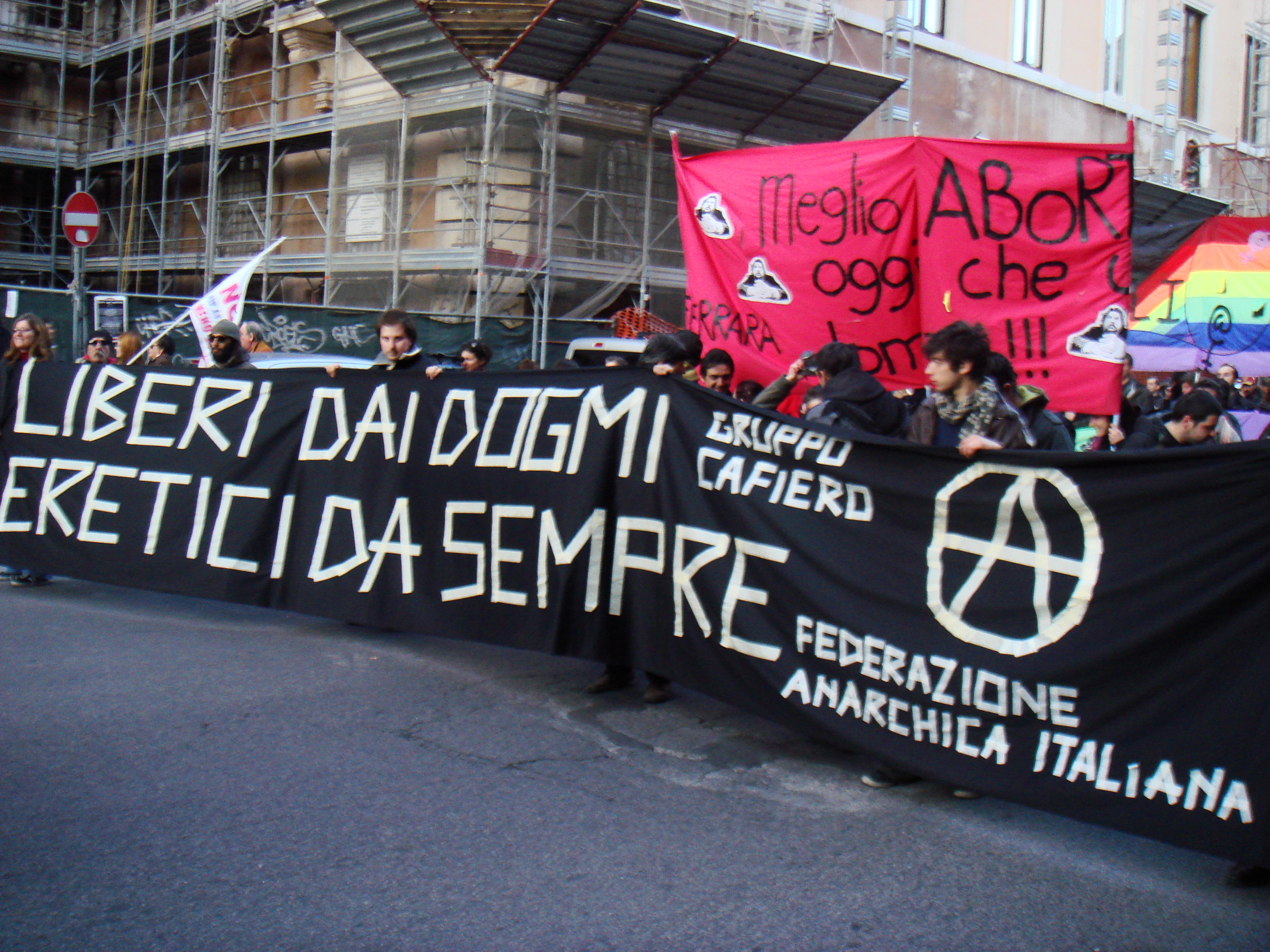
Contemporary members of the Italian Anarchist Federation marching in Rome

In the late sixties a new generation of young people created various informal anarchist groups and projects outside of the original formal organizations of the Italian Anarchist Federation and the Unione Sindacale Italiana. On 12 December 1969, a bomb went off at the Piazza Fontana in Milan that killed 17 people and injured 88. Giuseppe Pinelli, an Italian railroad worker and anarchist, was picked up, along with other anarchists, for questioning regarding the attack. Just before midnight on 15 December 1969, Pinelli was seen to fall to his death from a fourth floor window of the Milan police station. Most commentators now agree the bomb was placed by neofascist activists as part of a plot inspired by sections of the secret services. Later, in the Years of Lead, the trend of anarchism was violently repressed, while it survived throughout and continued to exist.

In the early seventies, a platformist tendency emerged within the Italian Anarchist Federation which argued for more strategic coherence and social insertion in the workers' movement while rejecting the synthesist "Associative Pact" of Malatesta which the FAI adhered to. These groups started organizing themselves outside the FAI in organizations such as O.R.A. from Liguria which organized a Congress attended by 250 delegates of grupos from 60 locations. This movement was influential in the autonomia movements of the seventies. They published Fronte Libertario della lotta di classe in Bologna and Comunismo libertario from Modena.

In 2022, Alfredo Cospito began a hunger strike to protest against his incarceration under the Article 41-bis prison regime. By February 2023, this protest had generated a debate in Italy about the revival of the anarchist movement. Bomb threats were made against a newspaper in Bologna and bullets were sent to another newspaper and to prosecutor general Francesco Saluzzo. Solidarity attacks against Italian diplomatic offices were made by anarchists in Argentina, Bolivia, Brazil, Chile, Germany, Greece, Netherlands, Portugal, Spain and Switzerland. Cospito stopped his hunger strike in April 2023 after his compulsory life sentence was ruled unconstitutional. He had lost 50 kg.

== Timeline ==
- 1865: Foundation of the International Revolutionary Brotherhood.
- 1869: Foundation of the Italian section of the International Workingman's Association.
- 1874: Bologna insurrection
- 1876: The red-and-black flag was first used by the Italian section of the First International.
- 1877: The Banda del Matese leads an insurrection.
- 1878: Giovanni Passannante attempts to assassinate King Umberto I of Italy.
- 1891: Capolago congress
- 1891: Foundation of the Socialist Revolutionary Anarchist Party.
- 1894: Lunigiana revolt
- 1894: Paolo Lega attempt to assassinate Prime Minister Francesco Crispi.
- 1897: Pietro Acciarito attempts to assassinate King Umberto I of Italy.
- 1900: Gaetano Bresci assassinates King Umberto I of Italy.
- 1911: Augusto Masetti shoots his military commander to protest the Italo-Turkish war.
- 1912: Foundation of the Unione Sindacale Italiana trade-union (joined the International Workers' Association founded in 1922).
- 1919: Foundation of the Italian Anarchist Communist Union.
- 1919: Beginning of the Italian Factory Occupations known as biennio rosso (two red years).
- 1921-1922: Fascists murder a number of anarchists, including Alberto Acquacalda and Pietro Ferrero.
- 1920: Publication of the newspaper Umanità Nova (New Humanity).
- 1920: Founding of the Unione Anarchica Italiana.
- 1921: Founding of the anti-fascist Arditi del Popolo.
- 1921: Dante Carnesecchi is shot dead by police.
- 1926: Gino Lucetti attempts to assassinate Benito Mussolini.
- 1936–1939: Sébastien Faure Century, French/Italian contingent of the Durruti Column in the Spanish Civil War.
- 1937: Antonio Cieri and Camillo Berneri are killed during the Spanish Civil War.
- 1940s: Anarchist brigades in the Italian Resistance
- 1945: Establishment of the Italian Anarchist Federation.
- 1969: Anarchists are blamed for the Piazza Fontana bombing in Milan. Giuseppe Pinelli dies in police custody and Pietro Valpreda is imprisoned for a number of years.
- 1970: The Barracks anarchists incident occurs, in which 5 young anarchists are killed in a car crash after uncovering documents linking the Italian state with Italian fascists.
- 1972: Franco Serantini dies in police custody.
- 1986: Foundation of the Federation of Anarchist Communists.
- 2001: Death of Carlo Giuliani in Genoa.
- 2003: Foundation of the Informal Anarchist Federation.
- 2012: Kneecapping of Ansaldo Nucleare CEO Roberto Adinolfi by Alfredo Cospito and Nicola Gai.
- 2022-2023: Hunger strike of Alfredo Cospito.
- 2024: creation of a Zone to Defend at the "Don Giovanni Bosco Park" in Bologna

== See also ==
- Category:Italian anarchists
- List of anarchist movements by region
- Autonomism
- Accidental Death of an Anarchist
- European individualist anarchism#Italy
- Fasci Siciliani
- Federazione Anarchica Italiana
- Socialism in Italy
