= Carlo Cafiero =

Italian Marxist-anarchist (1846–1892)

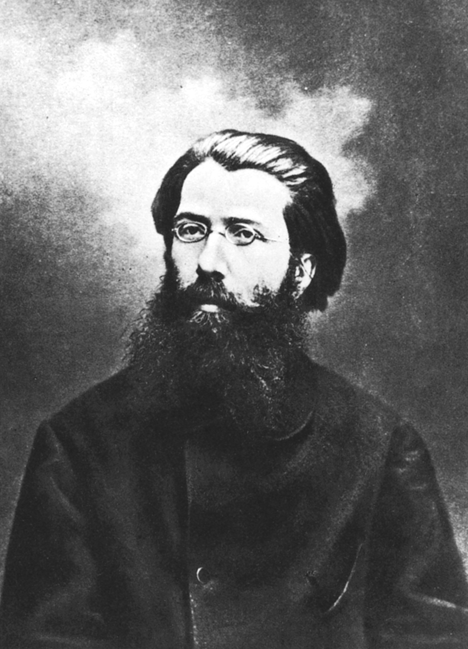
- Cafiero in 1878
- Born: 1 September 1846; Barletta, Apulia, Kingdom of the Two Sicilies
- Died: 17 July 1892 (aged 45); Nocera Inferiore, Campania, Kingdom of Italy
- Education: University of Naples
- Occupations: Activist, revolutionary, writer
- Years active: 1870–1882
- Era: Late modern period
- Organization(s): International Workingmen's Association (1870–1872); Anti-Authoritarian International (1872–1881); Italian Revolutionary Socialist Party (1882)
- Movement: Anarchism, Marxism
- Spouse: Olimpia Kutuzova

Carlo Cafiero (1 September 1846 – 17 July 1892) was an Italian anarchist that led the Italian section of the International Workingmen's Association (IWA). An early leader of the Marxist and then anarchist movements in Italy, he was a key influence in the development of both currents.

Born into a noble family in Apulia, he came to dislike the institutions of the Catholic Church and the monarchy, which drew him towards republicanism and revolutionary socialism. After moving to London, he fell under the influence of Karl Marx and Friedrich Engels, for whom he acted as an agent after returning to Italy. In Naples, he became a leader of the local internationalist movement, which consisted largely of anarchists. This caused friction between him and Engels, who saw anarchism as a threat to Marxism.

As Marx and Engels consolidated control over the IWA, Cafiero gravitated closer to anarchism, culminated with his meeting with Mikhail Bakunin. He then presided over the affiliation of the IWA's Italian section with Bakunin's Anti-Authoritarian International and its reorganization along anarchist lines and was a key participant to the Saint-Imier Congress. As a central figure in the Italian anarchist movement, Cafiero plotted the 1874 Bologna insurrection and led the 1877 Benevento insurrection, for which he was imprisoned. Cafiero then turned his attentions to writing. He penned a summary of Das Kapital, Volume I, a theoretical synthesis of anarchist communism and a series of articles about social revolution.

A committed insurrectionary anarchist, Cafiero clashed with the reformist Andrea Costa over their respective tactical outlooks. But following a period of extreme intransigence, isolation and mental decline, Cafiero himself moved towards social democracy and endorsed Costa's candidacy in the 1882 Italian general election. In the months after the election, Cafiero succumbed to his mental illness and was committed to a mental asylum. After a long battle with his condition, he died in an asylum from gastrointestinal tuberculosis.

Cafiero left a large legacy as an influential figure in the formation of the Italian anarchist and socialist movements. His figure was a source of inspiration for future generations of Italian activists and artists, and his works are still being studied into the 21st century.

== Early life and activism ==
Carlo Cafiero was born in Barletta on 1 September 1846, into a family of Apulian landowners. From an early age, he developed a fascination with religion. His family sent him to a seminary in Molfetta to train as a priest, but he instead came to hate the Catholic Church for what he perceived as its repressive practices. Cafiero also disliked farming and his native region, and at the age of 18, he left to study law at the University of Naples. After graduating, he began a career as a diplomat in the Italian capital of Florence. But he quickly grew bored with the job and quit, in order to pursue his intellectual interests in Islamic and Oriental studies.

He joined the radical circle led by Telemaco Signorini, whose criticisms of the nascent Kingdom of Italy laid the foundations for Cafiero's turn towards revolutionary socialism. In 1870, he left Italy for Paris, where he witnessed the end of the Second French Empire. The events of the Paris Commune inspired him to become a revolutionary. He then moved to London, where he joined other Italian republican exiles.

In the English capital, he attended lectures by the secularist Charles Bradlaugh and the meetings of industrial workers, where a speech by English trade unionist George Odger first convinced him of socialism. He soon joined the International Workingmen's Association (IWA) and quickly fell under the influence of Karl Marx and Friedrich Engels. As there was not yet any established Marxists in Italy, where left-wing politics were largely influenced by Mikhail Bakunin and Giuseppe Mazzini, Marx and Engels dispatched Cafiero back to his home country. In May 1871, Cafiero returned to Florence, where he established ties between the IWA and local workers' groups. He then moved onto Naples, where he dedicated himself to his work as an agent for the Marxist General Council.

== Internationalist agent ==
=== Marxist activities ===
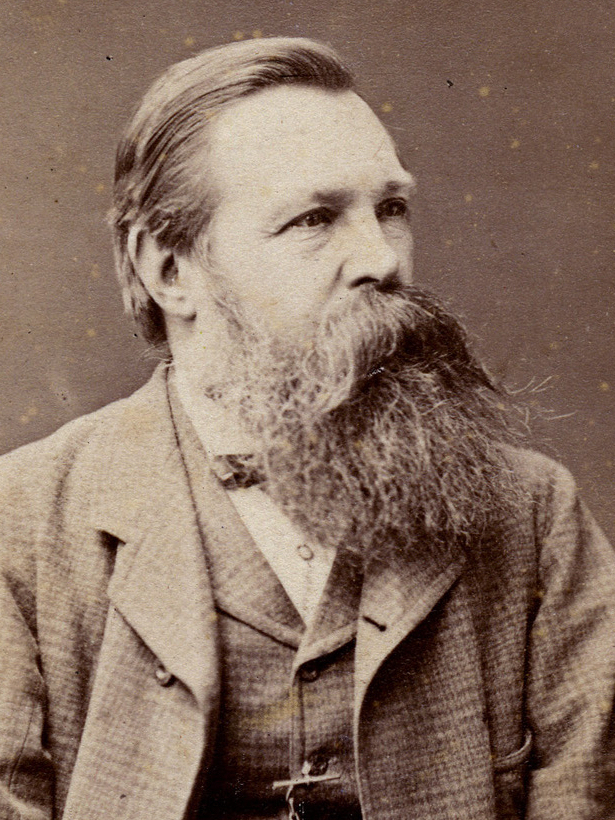
Friedrich Engels, a leading Marxist within the International Workingmen's Association and Cafiero's chief correspondent in 1871

Cafiero was introduced to the Neapolitan internationalists with a letter from Engels to Carlo Gambuzzi. As he was an agent of the general council, he was initially distrusted by the IWA's local section, which was largely made up of followers of Mikhail Bakunin. But his commitment to their activism quickly brought him into the leadership of the Neapolitan section, and he became fast friends with Errico Malatesta and Carmelo Palladino. Malatesta and Cafiero would be each other's closest friend and collaborator until the latter's death. By mid-1871, the internationalists were already facing heavy repression from the government of Giovanni Lanza. Together with Gambuzzi, Malatesta and Palladino, Cafiero managed to reorganise the Neapolitan section, despite attempts by the government to dissolve it. Cafiero was arrested on charges of subversion, but he was never tried and was let off with a fine a few days later. He discovered that his arrest had only strengthened public support for the IWA; the local section quickly reconstituted and the city became a center for the internationalist movement. The affair also enhanced his own reputation and he soon became the leading figure of the IWA in Italy.

In Cafiero's first letters to Engels, he described at length the extent of the poverty and oppression throughout Southern Italy and predicted that it made social revolution in the region inevitable. He focused much of his criticism of other revolutionary currents on Mazzini's nationalist and anti-socialist ideology; this worried Engels, who saw a greater danger in Bakunin's anarchism. Cafiero responded that he didn't see Bakunin's followers as a sectarian threat to the Marxists and thought the two factions shared a lot in common, hoping that he could bridge the divide between them.

Although Engels thought well of Cafiero, he also described him as a "natural mediator, and as such he is naturally weak". Engels began to distrust him and predicted that he may soon switch allegiances to Bakunin's faction. Engels insisted that Cafiero cut ties with the Neapolitan anarchists, as he considered Bakunin's faction to be actively harmful to the unity of the IWA. When Cafiero wrote back to Engels, he initially didn't respond to the complaints regarding the Bakuninists. He instead reported the Italian state's repression against the left-wing, explaining that the material conditions of the Southern peasantry had provided fertile ground for the IWA's organisers and for the possibility of a social revolution. In later letters to Engels, Cafiero defended Bakunin from the charges against him and reported the great popularity he had with Neapolitan workers. Further letters sent by Cafiero were met with silence from Engels. Having failed to heal the divide between the two factions, he was forced to choose between one or the other.

=== Conversion to anarchism ===
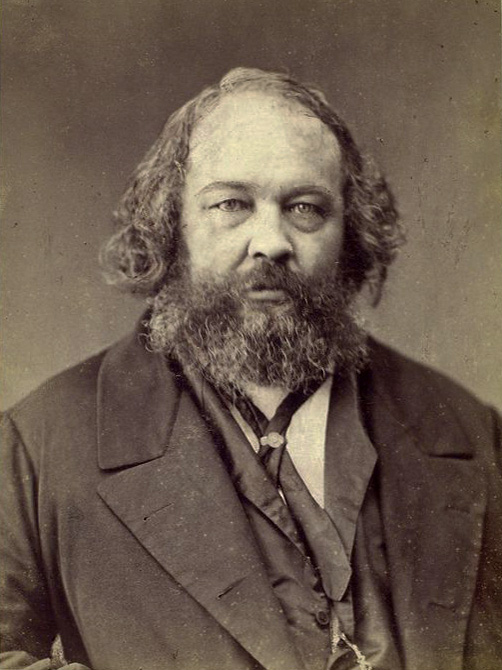
Mikhail Bakunin, the leader of the Anti-Authoritarian International and Cafiero's main collaborator in the early 1870s

Cafiero began to drift away from Marxism and towards Bakunin's conception of anarchism, the latter of which he considered more relevant to the material conditions of Southern Italy. When Mazzini called a workers' congress in Rome for November 1871, Cafiero translated and distributed a pamphlet by Bakunin that denounced Mazzini, claiming his true intentions were to organise a reactionary coup d'état that would establish a dictatorship in Italy. Cafiero disrupted the congress by distributing the pamphlet to its delegates; the congress itself was ultimately unsuccessful in reviving Mazzinianism and Mazzini himself died months later. When Engels praised him for this, Cafiero credited Bakunin as the author of the whole affair. That same month, the General Council adopted a resolution that called for the formation of a political party; the Italian section of the IWA rejected this proposal as "selling out" workers for political gain. Despite assurances from Engels to the contrary, Cafiero, who valued abstentionism, believed that this resolution had caused irreparable damage to the General Council's reputation among Italian workers. The dispute between the Italian section and the General Council was exacerbated further when Engels published an attack against Bakunin in La Roma del Popolo, which Cafiero fiercely criticised. When the Sonvilier Circular was issued in response, Cafiero took a neutral stance in the brewing factional conflict. As the split grew progressively worse, he stopped corresponding with Engels and decided to visit Bakunin.

Together with the Neapolitan anarchist Giuseppe Fanelli, in May 1872, Cafiero travelled to Switzerland. In Locarno, he finally met Bakunin, whose charismatic personality and revolutionary past immediately made an impression on Cafiero. After a month with Bakunin in Switzerland, Cafiero returned to Italy as a convinced anarchist. He wrote one final letter to Engels, informing him of his meeting with Bakunin and criticising his former mentor's Communist Manifesto for its "reactionary absurdity" and authoritarian character. Cafiero wrote that he rejected the General Council's attempts to centralise control over the IWA and transform it into a political party, as he now upheld the anti-authoritarian principle of autonomy. He ended the letter by declaring that "Italy will welcome with joy the death of the General Council." To this letter, Engels finally responded, accusing Cafiero of betraying his trust by disclosing their correspondence to Bakunin's Jura Federation. This time, it was Cafiero that didn't respond. Without Cafiero, the General Council's only remaining Italian ally was the "moderate" and "unenergetic" Enrico Bignami.

In order to strengthen the Italian position against the General Council, Cafiero resolved to unify the different sections of the IWA in Italy into a single national federation. Following Cafiero's lead, the Fascio Operaio convened a conference in Rimini, setting it for August 1872. Together with Giuseppe Fanelli and Tito Zanardelli, Cafiero attended as a delegate from the Naples section; Cafiero himself was elected as the conference's president. With Cafiero at the helm, the conference was predominated by anarchists. They voted to cut ties with the Marxist General Council, in defiance of Bakunin's warning against open secession. They instead proposed the formation of a separate international organisation for anti-authoritarian socialists, which would later become the Anti-Authoritarian International.

Although Marxists would later claim that Bakunin was responsible for the split of the Italian section, anarchists held "the headstrong Cafiero" responsible. Historians such as E. H. Carr and George Woodcock concluded that the Italian secession resulted in the weakening of the anarchist voting bloc at the Hague Congress and motivated Marx's denunciations of Bakunin. At the Hague Congress, which Cafiero attended as an observer, he rejected appeals by anarchist delegates such as James Guillaume to maintain good relations with the Marxists. Marx and Engels themselves used the Congress to consolidate control and expel the anarchists from the IWA. Engels went as far as to declare that "an Italian federation of the IWA does not exist." The Marxist-led IWA collapsed not long after, as many of its largest sections defected to the anarchists. The anarchists themselves convened the St. Imier Congress, which reconstituted the IWA as the Anti-Authoritarian International. Cafiero attended the congress, together with Costa, Fanelli, Malatesta and Nabruzzi. These Italian delegates went on to form the leadership of the nascent Italian anarchist movement. Together they oversaw the rapid growth of the Italian Federation and its development along anarchist lines. The government was frightened by its growth and began arresting its leading members, including Cafiero, and shutting down numerous sections throughout Emilia-Romagna. In March 1873, members that managed to escape arrest held a secret congress in Bologna, where they adopted the anarchist ideology and federalist structure upheld by the Anti-Authoritarian International and rejected the "dictatorship" of the General Council. With evidence provided by Cafiero, the congress also exposed the police spy Carlo Terzaghi and expelled him from the Federation.

== Insurrectionary leadership ==
=== 1874 insurrection ===
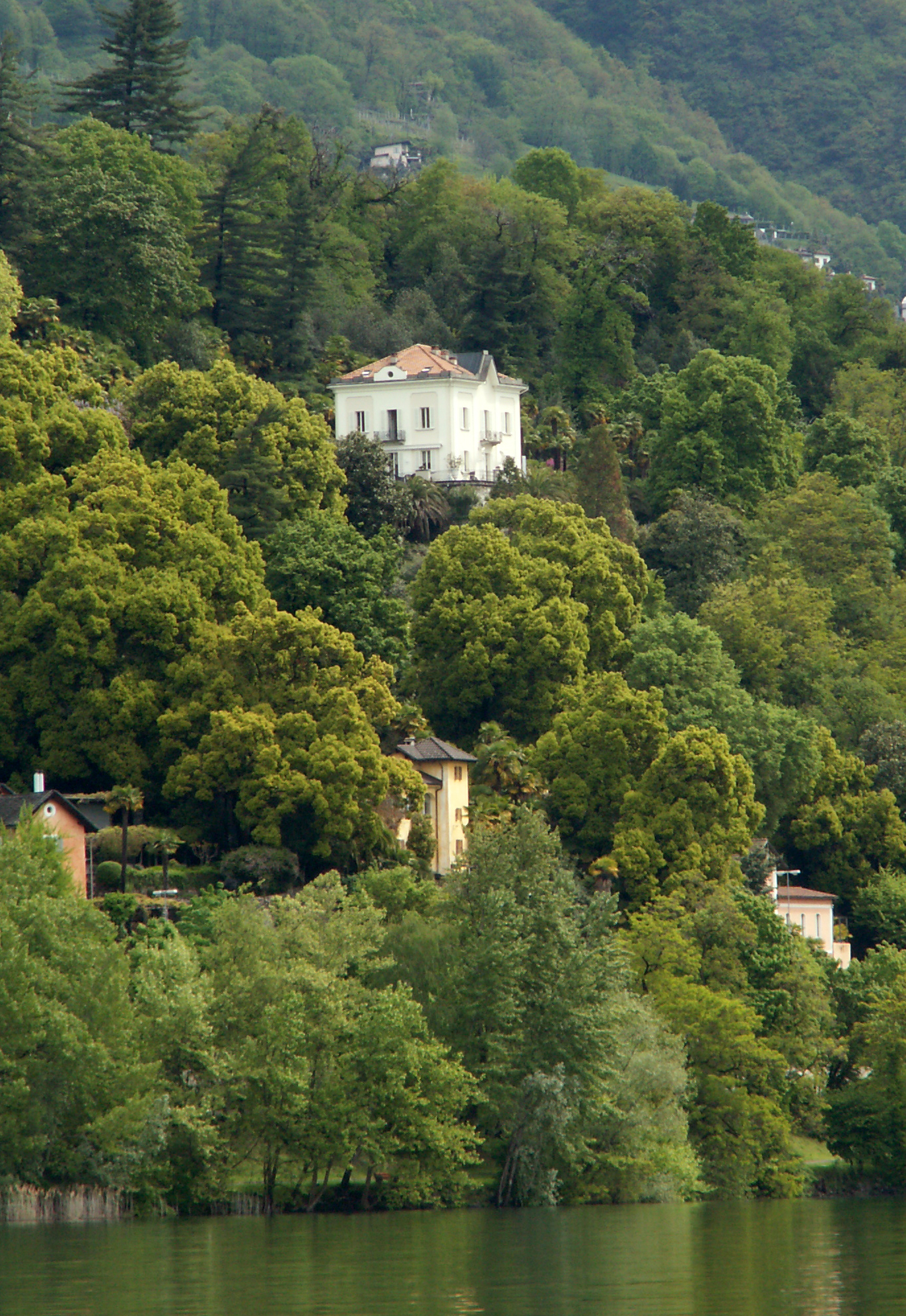
La Baronata, the house in Locarno that Cafiero bought for Mikhail Bakunin

On 9 May 1873, Cafiero, Costa and Malatesta were released from pre-trial detention, due to a lack of evidence against them. Cafiero travelled back to his home town of Barletta and sold off his properties there. He then became the main financial sponsor of the international anarchist movement, paying the expenses of delegates to anarchist congresses. He also bought a villa in Locarno, La Baronata, for Bakunin to use as his headquarters. Together these expenses drained him of most of his fortune. Following the outbreak of the Petroleum Revolution in Spain, Malatesta and Bakunin sought funds from Cafiero to travel there. But Malatesta was arrested en route and Cafiero refused Bakunin's request, as he considered the risk of death too great for the anarchist leader. By the time Cafiero himself arrived in Locarno, the Spanish revolution had been suppressed and Bakunin was convinced to remain in Switzerland. By the autumn of 1873, as an economic crisis was caused widespread discontent to break out in Italy, Bakunin and Cafiero instead began planning for an insurrection to be carried out there.

In December 1873, Cafiero and Costa established the Comitato Italiano per la Rivoluzione Sociale (CIRS), an organisation consisting largely of younger Italian anarchists that dedicated themselves to preparing for an imminent insurrection. The Italian authorities quickly discovered the CIRS and, fearing their planned insurrection, began arresting members of the International throughout Italy, forcing the Italian sections underground and strengthening the anarchists' commitment to their insurrectionary strategy. Internationalists met in Lugano on 18 March 1874 to discuss the planned insurrection. Despite Cafiero's request for support, non-Italian delegates refused to endorse the plot, as they favoured the tactic of the general strike and believed that socialism was not yet widespread enough in Italy for an insurrection to be successful. As a result, the CIRS ultimately decided to delay its call to arms. Together with Cafiero, Costa and Malatesta used the subsequent months to refine their plan of action, while they continued to build their insurrectionary network throughout the country. They also distanced themselves from the Mazzininian republicans and Garibaldian socialists, bringing the insurrectionary movement entirely under anarchist influence. Cafiero used his money to fund the purchase of weapons, which he sent to Costa in southern Italy in the care of Bakunin's associate Mikhail Sazhin, securing the distribution of over 250 firearms to the insurrectionists.

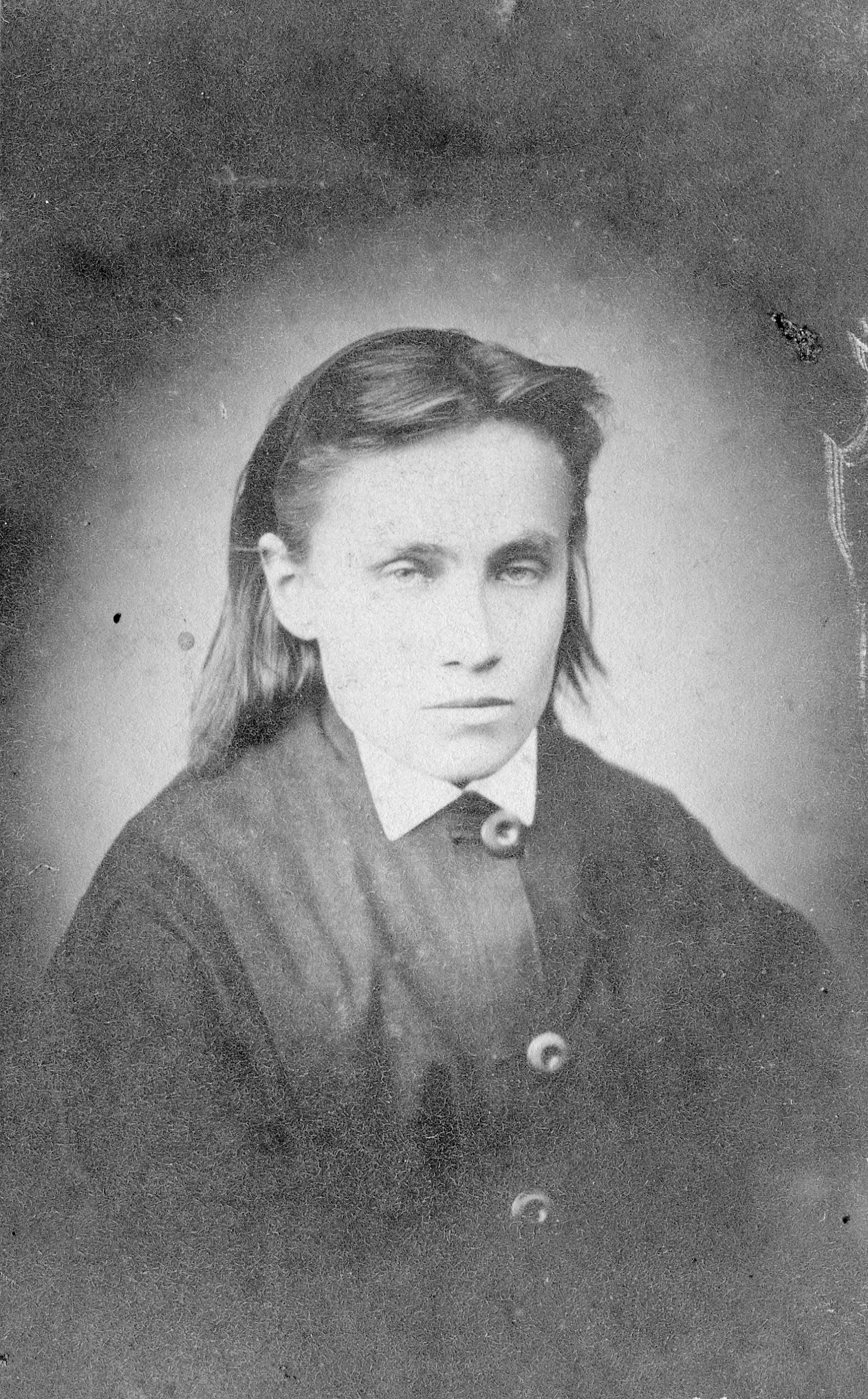
Olimpia Kutuzova, Cafiero's wife, for whom he was absent during the 1874 Bologna insurrection

While preparation for the uprising was underway, Cafiero began a relationship with the Russian revolutionary Olimpia Kutuzova. In April 1874, he travelled to the Russian Empire to marry her, so that she could be provided with an Italian citizenship and passage to western Europe. In July 1874, Cafiero liquidated the remainder of his estate in Barletta, in order to pay for the upkeep of La Baronata and the passage of Bakunin's family from Siberia to Switzerland. During her journey, Bakunin's wife Antonia was told by Carlo Gambuzzi that Bakunin had exploited Cafiero for his money. When probed about this, Bakunin asked Cafiero to deny it as a rumour, but he instead told his mentor that he had indeed felt exploited, as he was now left financially destitute. Moreover, his dedication to supporting Bakunin had distracted him from the planning for the imminent anarchist insurrection, which he contributed little to, despite ostensibly being the operation's leader.

By August 1874, the Italian authorities uncovered the plot and arrested many of the prospective insurrection's leaders, including Costa. The raids forced the hand of the insurrectionists, with Bakunin and his followers resolving to improvise a new plan for the insurrection. On 7 August, hundreds of insurgents assembled in Emilia-Romagna and constructed barricades in Bologna, while a call to arms written by Cafiero was pasted on walls throughout the country, to little effect. But the plan failed and the insurgents - many of whom were unarmed - either dispersed or were arrested after coming face to face with the Carabinieri. Dismayed with the failure, Bakunin fled the country in disguise. Other uprisings throughout Italy were either suppressed or failed to materialise. In Puglia, Malatesta's small insurrectionary band was quickly disbanded; he attempted to escape but was also arrested. The fallout from the abortive insurrection severely damaged the Italian anarchist movement, as well as Cafiero's already-strained relationship with Bakunin, the latter of whom died two years later.

=== Move underground and reorganisation ===
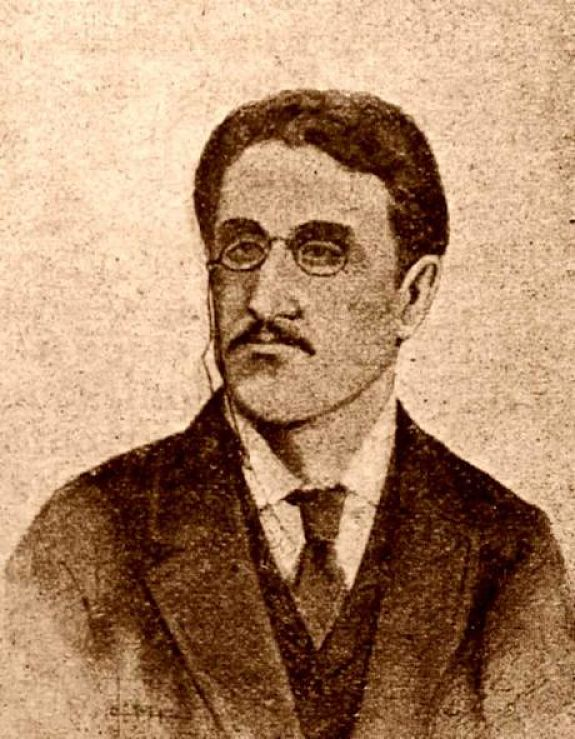
Emilio Covelli, Cafiero's closest friend and collaborator during the mid-1870s

With the Italian anarchist movement facing heightened repression, the Italian Federation - officially dissolved by the government - moved underground and became a clandestine organisation, directed by Cafiero and his followers within the CIRS. Cafiero attempted to organise another armed uprising in early 1875, but as the Federation's membership was thoroughly demoralised by the previous failed insurrection, it failed to materialise. For the subsequent year, the Italian anarchist movement was effectively dormant, with no major actions being undertaken. During this period of inactivity, Cafiero and Bakunin managed to reconcile, with the help of Malatesta. After a stint attempting to farm crops in La Baronata, in October 1875, Cafiero said farewell to Bakunin for the last time and left for Milan, while his wife returned to Russia. Cafiero found that he preferred small manual jobs to his other avenues of employment, and supported himself by working at a factory that made photographs for headstones.

At this time, Cafiero began writing for the Italian socialist newspaper La Plebe. but he struggled with the demands of journalism, as well as his disagreements with the newspaper's reformist editorial line. In November 1875, Cafiero published the article "The Times Are Not Yet Ripe", in which he elaborated his thoughts on what made someone a "real revolutionary". He criticised "revolutionary pose[rs]" that complained about the status quo while also passively accepting it, people he denounced as only ever talking about revolution without ever believing the time was right for one. Cafiero believed that there was no better time to push for a social revolution than the present moment. In January 1876, Cafiero wrapped up his work at La Plebe and left Milan for Rome, where he reunited with Malatesta, with whom he reestablished the local section of the Italian Federation. Following the rise to power of Agostino Depretis's Historical Left, Cafiero and Malatesta began planning to officially reconstitute the Italian Federation and resume public activities. But the new left-wing government ended up continuing the previous government's campaign of repression against the anarchists, which forced Cafiero to leave Rome for Naples. Nevertheless, the Italian anarchist movement experienced a resurgence during 1876, with Andrea Costa overseeing the public reconstitution of the Italian Federation in Emilia-Romagna.

In Naples, the movement struggled to reconstitute itself without the leadership of Malatesta and Cafiero, who were preoccupied with other tasks. The leadership of the Neapolitan movement thus passed to the intellectual Emilio Covelli. After Bakunin's death, Covelli became Cafiero's closest collaborator; the two were formed schoolmates, who had together attended both seminary and university. Previously a convinced Marxist, after Covelli reunited with Cafiero, he joined his anarchist association in Naples. Although the pair rejected the authoritarianism of Marxism, they continued to uphold its criticism of capitalism, synthesising Marxist theory and anarchist practice in a way that appealed to Italian workers. Covelli and Cafiero both challenged the conflict between Marxism and anarchism, often taking elements from both. Cafiero also attempted to remedy the issues that had led to the failure of the Bologna insurrection by developing a new revolutionary ideology, which eventually grew into the synthesis of anarchist communism. As his aim, Cafiero posited a society without authority or private property, which he proposed would be achieved through propaganda of the deed.

Together with Malatesta, on 21 October 1876, Covelli and Cafiero attended the Italian Federation's third congress in the small Tuscan village of Tosi. Hiding in a forest near the village, in order to avoid the Carabinieri, the delegates reaffirmed their anarchist principles and commitment to revolution, as well as their opposition to electoralism or collaboration with republicans. The delegates also broke from Bakunin's theory of collectivist anarchism and instead adopted Cafiero's new platform of anarchist communism, which proposed resources be distributed "from each according to their ability, to each according to their needs". Finally, Cafiero was elected to head a new correspondence commission in Naples and delegated to attend the Anti-Authoritarian International's Bern Congress, together with Errico Malatesta. The Bern Congress, which took place the following week, demonstrated that the anarchists were now alone within the International, which had been abandoned by other non-Marxist socialists and left effectively as a rump organisation. As the Congress closed, Malatesta and Cafiero issued an announcement on the new position of the Italian Federation, which now fully upheld anarchist communism and propaganda of the deed.

=== 1877 insurrection ===
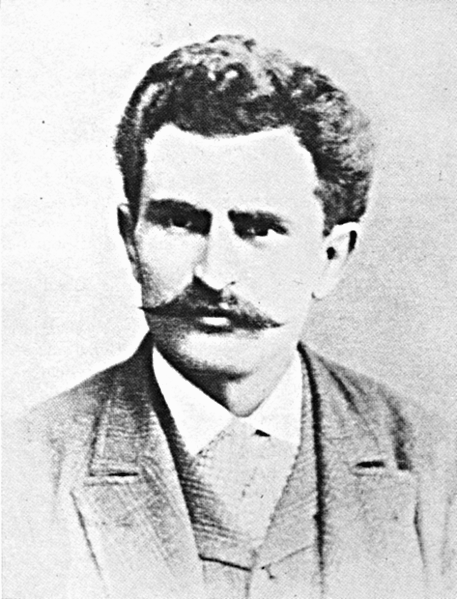
Errico Malatesta, Cafiero's co-leader in the Banda del Matese

By the winter of 1876, Cafiero and Malatesta were plotting another anarchist insurrection, together with Emilio Covelli and Pietro Cesare Ceccarelli. They planned the insurrection to be carried out in the Matese mountains, where violent anti-establishment sentiment had previously culminated in the Post-Unification Italian Brigandage. Cafiero and Malatesta remained in Switzerland to raise money, aiming to buy weapons for the uprising. They were unable to sell the dilapidated Baronata, nor did they successfully gain employment as construction workers. They then concocted a scheme to acquire the inheritance of a sympathetic Russian socialite by arranging a marriage between her and the Russian anarchist Peter Kropotkin, but James Guillaume dissuaded him from going along with their plan. With only scant amounts of money from donations and the sale of Cafiero's last property in Barletta, they began putting their plan into motion.

In December 1876, they returned to Naples, where they established an insurrectionary general staff together with other Italian anarchists. Andrea Costa refused to join them, fearing the time was not right for an insurrection, but promised he would launch his own uprising in Emilia-Romagna if the southern insurrection was successful. Throughout the first months of 1877, Cafiero and Malatesta travelled around the country recruiting volunteers; about one hundred signed up to join the insurrection. Before the insurrection was even underway, their circle had been infiltrated by an informant and the government was aware of their plans. Cafiero and Malatesta's movements were tracked by the police, but Interior Minister Giovanni Nicotera held off from arresting them immediately, as he wanted to entrap the insurrectionists after they had taken up arms. By April 1877, the anarchists began to suspect that the authorities knew their plans and decided to accelerate the planned uprising, which commenced a month earlier than they had planned.

On 3 April, Cafiero and Malatesta went to San Lupo, where they had set their rendezvous point, and offloaded boxes full of rifles and ammunition. They waited for other insurrectionists to arrive, but many were arrested en route. On the night of 5 April, the insurgents in San Lupo caught a small group of carabinieri surveilling them and opened fire, killing one and injuring two others. The insurgents then quickly packed up their rifles and equipment, before heading out into the mountains and carry out their "experiment in propaganda of the insurrectionary deed". The small insurgent group - known as the Banda del Matese - consisted of about 24 young anarchist workers from northern Italy, led by Cafiero and Malatesta. The band was inexperienced, poorly equipped and short on members. With the exception of the southerners Cafiero and Malatesta, most of them were even entirely unable to understand the local Neapolitan language. They also faced freezing winter weather, which further exacerbated their difficulties provisioning themselves and engaging with the local population. Meanwhile, Guglielmo De Sauget deployed a 12,000-strong counterinsurgency force to the mountains, quickly capturing San Lupo and cutting off the insurgent supply lines. This forced the insurgents northwest into Terra di Lavoro, where they managed to escape the Italian state's cavalry. There they purchased food and local guides.

By 8 April, the insurgent band arrived in the small village of Letino. They then gathered and burned the towns land deeds and tax records, before redistributing the town hall's weapons and money to the population. In order to ensure the authorities wouldn't blame the local people for the damages, Cafiero, Malatesta and Ceccarelli made sure to leave written documentation that anarchists had occupied Letino "in the name of social revolution". Beneath a large red and black flag, Cafiero then gave a long revolutionary speech in the Neapolitan language. He proclaimed the overthrow of the Kingdom of Italy and the establishment of a communist republic, as well as the abolition of taxes and conscription. He ended his speech by calling on the town's people to redistribute the local land amongst themselves and to defend their gains from the state: "The rifles and the axes we have given you, the knives you have. If you wish, do something, and if not, go fuck yourselves." He was followed by the local priest, who reinterpreted his words as a new gospel and blessed Cafiero's band as apostles of the Christian God.

With their work done, they quickly continued on their way to the neighbouring town of Gallo. There they encountered another sympathetic local priest, who reassured the peasants not to fear anything and declared the event would be little more than a "change of government and burning of papers." As before, they declared a social revolution, burned all the official documents and redistributed the town hall's weapons and money to the population, before quickly leaving for the next town along. Upon leaving they found that, although the local peasantry was sympathetic to their cause, they remained suspicious of the revolutionary outsiders and wary of participating in the insurrection. The band then went across the mountains towards Molise, but when they found Venafro occupied by government soldiers, they retreated back towards Letino. They marched for two days through heavy rain and without food, finding every town likewise occupied by soldiers. They attempted to scale the mountains into unoccupied territory, but the worsening weather prevented all attempts to move forward and they decided to seek shelter near Letino, where they were surrounded by the bersaglieri. They discovered that they had been given up by the local peasants and that their weapons had been rendered inoperable by the rain. On 12 April, the entire band was arrested without issue. The Banda del Matese had ultimately failed to provoke the nationwide uprising they had hoped for.

Cafiero and his band were held for 16 months in pre-trial detention. They were ultimately charged with conspiracy to overthrow the government and the killing of a carabinieri, for which their prosecutors sought the death penalty. But following the death of Victor Emmanuel II in 1878, a political amnesty was proclaimed by his successor Umberto I. This meant that the lives of Cafiero and Malatesta would be spared, if they could prove to a jury that their shootout with the carabinieri in San Lupo had been politically motivated. On 14 August 1878, their trial began in the Naples Corte d'Assise, which was surrounded by a sympathetic crowd. One of their defense lawyers was a young Francesco Saverio Merlino, who in the wake of the trial would become the country's foremost legal defender of anarchists. When accused by the prosecution of having killed the carabinier due to their "blood lust", Cafiero and Malatesta declared that their goal had been to incite a social revolution and rejected their characterisation as "common criminals and murderers". The defendants all refused to respond to the accusations and instead used the trial to elaborate their political program, with Cafiero giving the first public defense of anarchist communism in an Italian court. The defense succeeded in using the trial as a vehicle for political propaganda, with Merlino's closing arguments denouncing the authoritarianism of the Italian state. On 25 August, the jury found the defendants not guilty, after only an hour of deliberations. When Cafiero and his co-defendants were released, they were greeted by a large crowd of celebrating supporters.

== Later years and decline ==
Following his release, in September 1878, Cafiero fled once again into exile in Lugano, as he feared the Italian authorities would find a pretext to imprison him. In his place, leadership of the southern Italian anarchists was taken up by Merlino, Palladino and Ceccarelli, who continued to uphold Cafiero's insurrectionary platform, although without the resources or organisation to launch another uprising. Without Cafiero or Malatesta, the Italian anarchist movement entered a sustained period of decline, as its members became disillusioned, isolated or inactive, while intransigent sectarian conflicts began to manifest over ideological and tactical differences.

In June 1879, Cafiero published his summary of Karl Marx's Das Kapital, Volume I, which he had read during his time in prison. His study received high praise from Marx himself, who advised Cafiero to further elaborate on how the material conditions for social revolution are created by the exploitation of labour. Cafiero attempted to do so in the form of a Socratic dialogue, but his manuscripts were confiscated by Swiss police. Instead, he worked further on his anarchist communist synthesis of Bakuninism and Marxism.

=== Rivalry with Costa ===
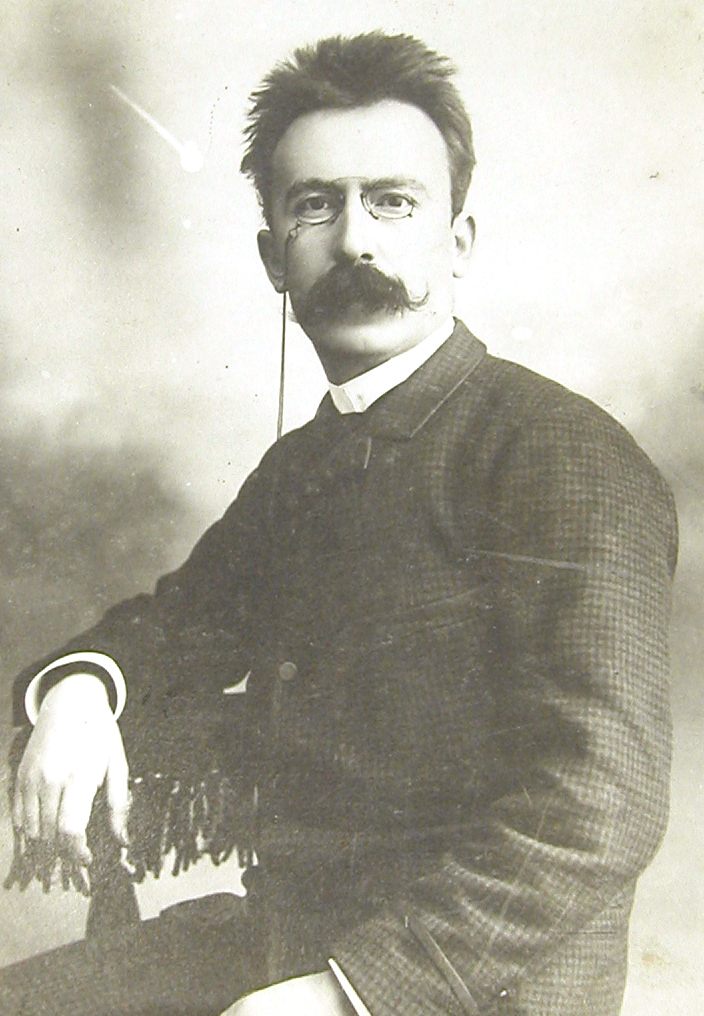
Andrea Costa, who after his turn towards reformist socialism became a target of Cafiero's polemics

In the wake of Cafiero's second failed insurrection, he was disowned by sections of the international socialist movement, particularly by French and German social democrats, who denounced Cafiero and Malatesta as "criminals" and "provocateurs". The insurrection also caused a schism within the Italian anarchist movement, which divided into supporters and opponents of insurrectionary anarchism, the latter of which came to be led by Andrea Costa. Costa had already been losing his interest in revolutionary socialism since the failure of the 1874 insurrection, while Cafiero himself had only intensified his calls for an immediate armed uprising. By the time that the 1877 insurrection was suppressed, he was beginning to drift towards legalitarian means. In July 1879, Costa published an open letter in La Plebe, in which he outlined the failures of insurrectionary anarchism and called for the creation of a revolutionary socialist political party, which would have collectivist anarchism as its ultimate goal. His "maximalist socialism" presented a middle ground between Cafiero's social anarchism and Enrico Bignami's social democracy, advocating for short term reforms as a means to build towards social revolution.

Although Costa's letter won over many anarchist leaders, Malatesta noticed the implicit direction of Costa's proposals and commissioned Cafiero to write a response on behalf of the Italian Federation. Cafiero also recognised the problems that faced the anarchist movement, but instead called for them to reorganise based on their same original principles. Cafiero warned that Costa's political party would inevitably turn towards authoritarianism and exclusivism, in order to safely remain within the political system. He also disregarded Costa's proposal for peaceful propaganda and education, arguing that it was only through direct action and propaganda of the deed that workers and peasants could be convinced to join the revolutionary cause. Instead of a political party or another public organization like the International, which he believed could respectively be coopted or infiltrated, Cafiero proposed that anarchists establish a "secret party" that could devote itself to direct action while guarding itself from infiltration. Building on the ideas of Mikhail Bakunin and Carlo Pisacane, Cafiero's conspiratorial proposal set the groundwork for the development of an anti-organisational tendency in Italian anarchism. It also preceded a complete polarisation within the anarchist movement, as Costa's legalistic and moderate proposals for a political party were unable to reconcile with Cafiero's illegalist and extreme proposals for conspiratorial direct action.

By 1880, Costa had abandoned any pretence of anarchism entirely, which caused a dramatic break between him and Cafiero. Cafiero, who still advocated for a violent revolution, was deeply angered by Costa's reformist turn. In letters to other Italian anarchists, Cafiero denounced parliamentarism as "the plague of our revolutionary party" and attacked Costa's calls for "minor and practical programs", which he felt presented a danger to socialism. In a letter to Francesco Pezzi, sent in November 1880, Cafiero speculated that the anarchist movement could benefit from the "loss of innocence" caused by Costa's split. In December 1880, Cafiero's anarchist faction managed to dominate the Italian Federation's Chiasso Congress, which officially adopted anarchist communism and took a firm oppositional stance against reformism and electoralism. This would prove a pyrrhic victory, as it would end up being the last Italian congress of the International and result in a strengthening of the legalitarian faction, which quickly established its own organisations. According to Peter Kropotkin, while Costa was in prison during the winter of 1880-1881, Cafiero attempted to court Costa's lover Anna Kuliscioff, but his advances were rejected.

That same month, Cafiero published the article "Action", in which he declared that Costa's cooperation with "bourgeois political institutions" amounted to a renunciation of socialism and an acceptance of capitalism. Cafiero rejected proposals for electing socialist parliamentary representatives, which he claimed represented little more than "to participate in [our own] oppression". Instead, he called for anarchists to take immediate and violent direct action against the system, which to him meant killing capitalists and their collaborators. Cafiero framed such attacks as "revolutionary gymnastics", which would prepare the masses for revolution. By the spring of 1881, many more within the anarchist movement were publishing public attacks against Costa, especially as he continued to insist that he was still a revolutionary. Over time, Cafiero's own attacks against Costa became more personal and violent, denouncing him by name as an "apostate" and a "traitor" to the revolutionary cause. In an open letter he published on 21 July 1881, Cafiero even called for Costa to be assassinated. This only served to outrage and consolidate Costa's support base in Emilia-Romagna, where he founded the Italian Revolutionary Socialist Party (PSRI) three days later.

=== Declining health and death ===
By this time, Cafiero's mental and physical health had begun to rapidly decline; he suffered a nervous breakdown in the summer of 1881. He had already been suffering from paranoia for years, but sustained harassment by the police, despair over his revolutionary failures and his personal conflict with Costa drove him further into a deep desire for isolation. At this time, Peter Kropotkin was preparing to hold a Congress in London, where he planned to reorganise the Anti-Authoritarian International into a dual organisation, consisting of both a large public organisation and central secret group dedicated to direct action. While Malatesta agreed with the proposal, albeit modified to include an "international revolutionary league", Cafiero himself expressed disdain for the idea. Cafiero had become disillusioned with large public organisations and called for anarchists to instead emulate contemporary Russian revolutionaries by forming small clandestine cells. Cafiero wanted the central purpose of the London Congress to be deciding how they would organise violence. He was dissatisfied with Kropotkin's proposed conspiratorial group, which he believed would lead nowhere as it lacked sufficient funding. Instead Cafiero expressed his desire to disappear into a small and isolated revolutionary cell, while he awaited the "Last Judgment". Cafiero refused to attend the London Congress, despite the apparent sympathy of many of the delegates towards his conspiratorial and terroristic methods. The London Congress of July 1881 would end up establishing a new International Working People's Association (IWPA), which upheld his insurrectionary anarchism.

In September 1881, Cafiero was expelled from Switzerland and found himself in London. There he attempted to reunite with Marx, but he too was suffering from his own declining health. Cafiero's mental illness only got worse during his stay in London, where he only confided in Malatesta due to his paranoia that all his other friends were spying on him. Aside from his paranoia, Cafiero also alienated his friends at times when he was lucid, especially when he began to express a sudden ideological shift. The expansion of suffrage in Italy in February 1882 had finally made electoralism a realistic strategy for the legalitarian socialists, spurring Andrea Costa to intensify his campaign to elect socialist candidates to the Italian parliament. Cafiero was contacted by Bignami, who hoped to solicit his support for the upcoming election. Persuaded by the recent electoral gains of the German Social-Democratic Party, Cafiero decided to move back to Italy, settling in Milan in March and returning to his work at La Plebe. The following month, Cafiero made an announcement that shocked his anarchist comrades: their most ardent apologist of permanent revolution now expressed support for electoralism. He proclaimed that he had "submitted" to the will of Costa's party, declaring that "it is much better to take a single step with all the comrades on the real path of life than to remain isolated and to cover hundreds of leagues in the abstract". His friend Francesco Pezzi concluded that such a massive ideological leap could only mean that "Cafiero has gone crazy". Malatesta himself concurred that "[even] if his brain is sick, his heart is pure." Italian historian Nunzio Pernicone disputed that Cafiero's conversion to electoral socialism was entirely as a result of his mental decline, but concluded that the two could not be completely dissasociated.

Although he was quickly welcomed into the electoral camp by the legalitarian socialists, on 5 April, Cafiero was arrested under suspicion of inciting class conflict. His attempts to clarify his new-found support for electoralism confused the police, who still regarded him as a "dangerous anarchist". While the authorities decided what to do with him, on 2 May, he suffered another nervous breakdown. He attempted to commit suicide, which finally brought the news of his mental decline into the public light. Much of the Italian public blamed the government for causing his mental illness and a campaign was swiftly launched to secure his release from prison, forcing the authorities to offer him a choice of house arrest in Barletta or expulsion back to Switzerland. Cafiero chose exile, and on 20 June, the police abandoned him over the border in Chiasso. There Cafiero again unsuccessfully attempted suicide, before being rescued by his old friend Emilio Bellerio, who took him into his house in Locarno. His mental health experienced some recovery over the subsequent summer months and he expressed a feeling of contentment in spite of his condition. When the anticipated 1882 Italian general election finally arrived, Cafiero was nominated as a protest candidate but refused to accept the nomination. In the end, Andrea Costa was successfully elected to the Chamber of Deputies, becoming Italy's first ever socialist representative. The oath of allegiance required for deputies to take their seats presented a personal and political problem to Costa, who had consistently affirmed his commitment to never swear loyalty to the monarchy, even if it meant not taking his seat. Costa wrote to Cafiero in order to solicit support for such a move, to which Cafiero responded affirmatively: "Go to Parliament, frankly take your oath, and serve the common cause."

Over the subsequent months, Cafiero's mental health deteriorated again into complete insanity. On 6 February 1883, Cafiero abruptly left Locarno and returned to Italy. Two days later, he was discovered wandering nude through the fields of Fiesole, where doctors found him convulsing in a pool of freezing water. Cafiero was subsequently committed to a mental asylum in Florence, where he remained for four years, despite campaigns for his release. His wife Olimpia Kutuzova returned to the country in order to help him, getting him transferred to an asylum in Imola, where his physical health improved somewhat. On 16 November 1887, Cafiero was released into Kutuzova's care, but his condition remained unstable. Together they moved to Cafiero's family home in Barletta, where the familiar environment helped him regain a level of lucidity. But his mental health ultimately didn't improve, and in 1891, he was committed to the asylum in Nocera Inferiore, where he died of gastrointestinal tuberculosis on 17 July 1892. His last words were "the principle is affirmed". In his epitaph to Cafiero, Emilio Covelli pondered: "Do you know why Cafiero is crazy? Because not knowing how to bend, he had to break."

== Political thought ==
=== Marxism ===
Cafiero, along with Emilio Covelli and Pietro Gori, elaborated a positivist approach to Marxism. Cafiero described Marxism as "the new truth that demolishes, crushes, and throws to the winds the centuries-old edifice of errors and lies." He saw it as a necessary theoretical basis for revolutionary socialism, comparing Marx's writings to weapons of war. But he also lamented that Marx was largely unknown in Italy during his time, as he thought Das Kapital was the most important intellectual achievement of the 19th century. Cafiero used Marxism to explain the concepts of the labour theory of value and property, the division of labour, capital accumulation and alienation, although he devoted most of his attention to elaborating on the problems caused by the exploitation of labour.

As Marx drew his understanding of social issues mostly from the industrialised economy of Great Britain, Cafiero believed this understanding was necessary for "all modern nations" that were on the path towards industrialisation, including Italy. Cafiero particularly found parallels between Marx's description of the exploitation of the English peasantry, and the destruction of its agrarian economy, and the situation of the Italian peasantry at that time. To Cafiero, any "progress" that occurred under capitalism happened at the behest of the ruling class, rather than occurring spontaneously for the "betterment of mankind".

To Cafiero, capitalism was an inhumane system built on violence against working people. He described the rise of European imperialism, which had spread the reach of capitalism throughout the globe, as a "sad story of blood". When he compared the violence imposed by imperialism to revolutionary violence, he claimed the latter to be insignificant in comparison to the former. He believed that a social revolution, after overthrowing the "unnatural" capitalist system that he felt corrupted a naturally rational and communal people, could bring the world into an "equilibrium of the most complete order, peace and happiness".

=== Anarchist communism ===
Although Cafiero admired Marx's critique of political economy, he distinguished it from his works of political theory, which he was highly critical of. While Cafiero upheld the Marxist economic system of distributing resources "from each according to their ability, to each according to their needs", he felt that Marxism had been corrupted by its statist proposals for a "dictatorship of the proletariat". Cafiero was also critical of the economic proposals of collectivist anarchism, which he argued could cause economic inequality and competition. He insisted that it was impossible for everyone to have equal access to the means of production, due to the differing geographical, physical or intellectual abilities of each individual. He also questioned the plausibility of determining each individual's contribution to collective production processes, as one person's work was inherently dependent on those of their colleagues.

He thus endeavored to synthesise Mikhail Bakunin's anarchism and Karl Marx's communism into a single doctrine, seeing the two ideological currents respectively as representing "liberty" and "equality". Cafiero believed that an anarchist communism could provide complete equality while also protecting society from authoritarianism. He thus proposed that the anti-statism of anarchism could act as a corrective influence on Marxism, while Marxist economic theory could provide anarchism with the scientific insight he thought it lacked. Inspired by James Guillaume's Idées sur l'organization social, which argued that a collectivist anarchist society could transition towards communism after achieving a situation of post-scarcity, Cafiero began developing his new synthesis in discussions with Emilio Covelli and Errico Malatesta. Although Cafiero himself would end up rejecting Guillaume's transitional programme, arguing that, instead of communism, it would give way to capital accumulation and social stratification.

Cafiero believed that a post-scarcity society could be rapidly achieved through a combination of cooperation, technological innovation and the elimination of luxury goods from production, which would allow the immediate establishment of anarchist communism after a social revolution. Under anarchist communism, Cafiero saw the potential for a new kind of technological development that could meet the needs of all people. Without a profit motive or the military industrial complex, this development would be driven by a desire to benefit the common good, transferring attentions towards improving education, medicine and welfare. Combined with the transfer of wealth previously accumulated by capitalists into a "general fund", Cafiero believed this would bring about a naturalistic post-work society.

Cafiero's proposal for anarchist communism was one he thought could return people to their natural state of cooperation, friendship and brotherhood. He saw the working-class family as an embryo for the realisation of anarchist communism, as every family member contributes what they can and receives what they need. To him, anarchist communism meant transforming society into a "great human family", in which people would be taught to see all others as part of their own family. Cafiero's anarchist communist thesis was ultimately elaborated by Peter Kropotkin, who oversaw the culmination of its development into a specific theory.

=== Revolutionary socialism ===
Cafiero was deeply concerned by reformism, which he considered to be a capitalist "Trojan Horse" that had corrupted socialism with an increasing acceptance of private property. Cafiero believed that capitalism could not be reformed, it had to be destroyed. He denounced attempts by socialists to form political parties and get elected to parliament, which he thought would only strengthen the capitalist system and delay revolution. To him, socialism and immediate revolutionary action were synonymous.

Cafiero declared that: "It is, therefore, of action that we have need, of action, always of action. With action, one acquires at the same time theory and practice because it is action that generates ideas, and it is action, again, that spreads them throughout the world." He believed that, instead of sending representatives to parliament, socialists ought to carry out violent attacks against capitalists and their collaborators. To Cafiero, every action taken against capitalism furthered the social revolution. He encouraged his readers to immediately carry out such action, warning that "if we wait to attack until the day we are completely prepared, we will never attack." He compared such revolutionary action to gymnastics, a way for the masses to strengthen their abilities and learn about revolution through practicing it. He also believed in the necessity of having a revolutionary vanguard, which he thought the masses would fall behind if such leadership proved themselves true to the revolutionary cause.

Cafiero believed that, as revolution was considered a criminal act, any anti-social behaviour by revolutionaries was justified. Cafiero didn't see violence as a problem to be solved, he saw it as a solution. He considered revolution to be a natural law that reasserted itself continuously throughout history, and that as the development of capitalism had established the "necessary ground for our revolution", he foresaw that revolutionary socialists would soon "eat the rich". To Cafiero, revolution was the "sublime law of nature, law of life and of progress, law of justice and love, law of liberty and equality". He claimed that the coming social revolution would inherit the goals of all previous revolutions, and would drive the elimination of religion, the nuclear family, private property and authority. After such a revolution, he believed that a classless society would be formed, in which all people would live in liberty, equality and fraternity.

While his vision of social revolution was principally concerned with the abolition of capitalism, Cafiero also concerned himself with the abolition of the state. He considered any state, even a socialist state, to present a danger to working people. He echoed Bakunin's predictions that a "dictatorship of the proletariat" would inevitably result in an authoritarian bureaucracy, which he feared would become "new and even more terrible political oppressors and economic exploiters". He proposed that in order to prevent the corrupting effects of power, a social revolution would need to establish a stateless society. Cafiero believed that government existed only to defend the privileged elite and oppress the masses, a system he wished to abolish through the establishment of universal liberty and equality under anarchist socialism. Cafiero's ultimate revolutionary aim was "to take away from man the means of inflicting useless and dangerous activity on humanity."

Cafiero thus argued passionately in favour of "propaganda of the deed", an idea he had developed from the earlier works of Bakunin. He defined propaganda of the deed as a permanent revolution carried out by any means necessary, whether it be by writing and public speaking, by violent attacks, or by voting. He compared it directly with the Marxist understanding of revolution, considering the two to be more or less identical in practice. Drawing from Bakunin, Cafiero believed that any revolutionary communist had a "permanent obligation to resist capitalism" by any means necessary. Cafiero believed that the revolutionary doctrines of Marxism and anarchism were thus opposed to reformist socialism, which he considered to be a means of reinforcing the status quo of capitalism. To Cafiero, there could be no effective collaboration with capitalism, as capitalists deserved to be punished for their exploitation and repression of workers. He concluded that: "To diminish, reduce, or limit our program, in a parliamentary sense, is to treat with the enemy, to fold one’s battle flag, to trick the people, and to renounce the revolution." Cafiero's revolutionary ideas formed the basis for the anarchist tendency of illegalism.

== Legacy ==
Cafiero's legacy was left by his organisation of the Italian anarchist movement, his ideological development of anarchist communism and insurrectionary anarchism, and his summaries of Marx's critique of political economy. Cafiero's summary of Das Kapital received numerous editions after his death: a second edition was published in 1913, with a preface by Luigi Fabbri; a third edition was published in 1920; and following the fall of the Fascist regime in Italy, a fourth edition was published by the Marxist publisher Samonà e Savelli, which omitted any reference to Cafiero's anarchism. A first edition copy was proudly preserved by Alessandro Mussolini, the father of fascist dictator Benito Mussolini. During the 1960s, while the Italian student Gian Carlo Maffei was browsing the Swiss Federal Archives, he discovered a manuscript of Cafiero's that had been unpublished since it was seized by police in 1881. From 1970 to 1972, four of Cafiero's essays on the subject of revolution were finally published by Maffei and Gianni Bosio. The final unpublished essay revealed that Cafiero, along with his concerns about capitalism, was worried about the dangers presented by the rise of authoritarian socialism.

Cafiero was venerated by Italian anarchists and socialists of his time, and in the wake of his death, he was made into a martyr for anarchist communism. Anarchist groups in Italy and America were named after him, while anarchist parents named their children "Cafiero", and artists dedicated several works to him. Cafiero appeared as a character in Riccardo Bacchelli's 1927 novel Il Diavolo al Pontelungo, which was about the Italian anarchist circle around Mikhail Bakunin. While Bacchelli depicted most of the anarchists as "delusional and ineffectual fanatics", Cafiero was portrayed relatively positively as a noble and generous man. Cafiero was also an inspiration for the main character in Paolo and Vittorio Taviani's 1972 film St. Michael Had a Rooster, which depicts the tension between revolutionary and scientific socialism during the insurrections of the 1870s.

Primary sources on Cafiero's life have been written by James Guillaume (who also penned the introduction to the 1910 edition of Cafiero's Summary of Capital) and Max Nettlau, in their respective histories of the IWA. Later histories of the Italian anarchist movement, written by Pier Carlo Masini, Enzo Santarelli, T.R. Ravindranathan and Nunzio Pernicone, situated Cafiero firmly within the anarchist tradition. On the other hand, Marxist historian Richard Drake depicted Cafiero as a "dissident forerunner" of Italian Marxism. His eventual endorsement of electoralism has also been taken by some historians as an example of classical anarchism's defeat by social democracy. Overall, Cafiero's ideological trajectory has challenged the dichotomy between Marxism and anarchism as opposing factions.

== Selected works ==
- Cafiero, Carlo (2018) [1879]. Karl Marx's Capital. Translated by Perrone, Paul M. – via Marxists Internet Archive.
- ——————— (2016) [1880]. "Anarchy and Communism". Marxists Internet Archive. Translated by Simonoff, Jessica.
- ——————— (1988) [1880]. "Action". The Raven. Translated by Walter, Nicolas. pp. 176–178 – via Marxists Internet Archive.
- ——————— (2012a) [1881]. "Revolution is a Natural Law". Revolution. Translated by McNab, Nestor. Edmonton: Black Cat Press. ISBN 978-1-926878-11-9 – via Marxists Internet Archive.
- ——————— (2012b) [1881]. "Our Revolution". Revolution. Translated by McNab, Nestor. Edmonton: Black Cat Press. ISBN 978-1-926878-11-9 – via Marxists Internet Archive.
- ——————— (2012c) [1881]. "Revolutionary Practice". Revolution. Translated by McNab, Nestor. Edmonton: Black Cat Press. ISBN 978-1-926878-11-9 – via Marxists Internet Archive.

== Bibliography ==
- Bantman, Constance (2019). "The Era of Propaganda by the Deed". In Adams, Matthew S.; Levy, Carl (eds.). The Palgrave Handbook of Anarchism. London: Palgrave Macmillan. pp. 371–388. doi:10.1007/978-3-319-75620-2_22. ISBN 978-3319756196. S2CID 150140014.
- Drake, Richard (2003). "Carlo Cafiero". Apostles and Agitators: Italy's Marxist Revolutionary Tradition. Harvard University Press. pp. 29–55. ISBN 0-674-01036-1. LCCN 2002191344.
- Graham, Robert (2019). "Anarchism and the First International". In Adams, Matthew S.; Levy, Carl (eds.). The Palgrave Handbook of Anarchism. London: Palgrave Macmillan. pp. 325–342. doi:10.1007/978-3-319-75620-2_19. ISBN 978-3319756196. S2CID 158605651.
- Léonard, Mathieu (2018). "Carlo Cafiero and the International in Italy: From Marx to Bakunin". In Bensimon, Fabrice; Quentin, Deluermoz; Moisand, Jeanne (eds.). Arise Ye Wretched of the Earth": The First International in a Global Perspective. Studies in Global Social History. Vol. 29. Brill. pp. 366–378. doi:10.1163/9789004335462_025. ISBN 978-90-04-33546-2.
- Levy, Carl (2013) [1989]. "Italian anarchism, 1870–1926". In Goodway, David (ed.). For Anarchism: History, Theory, and Practice. Routledge. pp. 25–78. ISBN 978-0-415-83448-3.
- Pengam, Alain (1987). "Anarcho-Communism". In Ribel, Maximilien; Crump, John (eds.). Non-Market Socialism in the Nineteenth and Twentieth Centuries. Palgrave Macmillan. pp. 60–82. doi:10.1007/978-1-349-18775-1_4. ISBN 978-1-349-18775-1.
- Pernicone, Nunzio (1993). Italian Anarchism, 1864–1892. Princeton University Press. ISBN 0-691-05692-7. LCCN 92-46661.
- Turcato, Davide (2019). "Anarchist Communism". In Adams, Matthew S.; Levy, Carl (eds.). The Palgrave Handbook of Anarchism. London: Palgrave Macmillan. pp. 237–248. doi:10.1007/978-3-319-75620-2_13. ISBN 978-3319756196. S2CID 242094330.
