= Carlo Gambuzzi =

Italian anarchist (1837–1902)

Carlo Gambuzzi.

Carlo Gambuzzi (26 August 1837 – 30 April 1902) was an Italian anarchist.

== Biography ==
Carlo Gambuzzi was born in Naples, Kingdom of the Two Sicilies, on 26 August 1837, the son of Pasquale and Maria Carolina Landolfi. His father, who owned a tobacco factory, wanted Gambuzzi to be educated by the Jesuits. But at a young age, he developed an interest in radical politics and opposed the rule of the House of Bourbon. In 1857, Gambuzzi helped to organise Carlo Pisacane's attempted uprising in Naples. In 1860, he was arrested and imprisoned for printing an illegal radical newspaper. Following the liberation of Southern Italy and the proclamation of the Kingdom of Italy, Gambuzzi began work as a lawyer. During this period, he became a follower of Giuseppe Mazzini and contributed to his newspaper Il Popolo d'Italia. He also established a number of trade unions, through which he hoped to build a republican movement.

By 1862, Gambuzzi had joined the southern branch of the Democratic Left, which positioned itself in opposition to the centralisation policies of Bettino Ricasoli and instead advocated for regional autonomy. Gambuzzi also called for judicial reform, criticising the form the judiciary had taken under the government of Urbano Rattazzi. Meanwhile, he joined Giuseppe Garibaldi in agitating for the unification of Rome and Venice under the new Italian state, culminating in the Third Italian War of Independence. By this time, an economic crisis in Naples had made him reconsider Mazzini's idealistic philosophy and move towards the anarchism advocated by Mikhail Bakunin.

In April 1867, Gambuzzi founded the Neapolitan anarchist newspaper Libertà e Giustizia, in which he argued against the state and capitalism and agitated for the establishment of a federal republic. He also became the leader of the local Masonic lodge, within which he organised Neapolitan republicans. He regularly corresponded with Mikhail Bakunin, despite their disagreement on whether to participate in the 1867 Italian general election. In September 1868, Gambuzzi attended the Bern Congress of the League of Peace and Freedom, where he joined Bakunin's International Alliance of Socialist Democracy. He founded the Neapolitan section of the International Workingmen's Association (IWA), which quickly grew to more than 1,200 members. In February 1869, he launched a campaign for freedom of the press in Italy and later established a new newspaper, Eguaglianza, which replaced the suppressed Libertà e Giustizia. In December 1869, he mobilised opposition to the First Vatican Council, helping to organise an anti-council in Naples.

Following the suppression of the Paris Commune in 1871, Gambuzzi moved away from anarchism towards socialism and established the Mazzinian Socialist Committee. After the government banned the Neapolitan section of the IWA, Gambuzzi and Carlo Cafiero re-established it as the Neapolitan Workers' Federation. In January 1872, they established the federation's official newspaper, La Campana, but it ceased publication only two months later. Gambuzzi focused his efforts on organising a girls' school, through which he aimed to eradicate illiteracy among working-class women. He also mediated between Bakunin and Errico Malatesta, and liased with the London branch of the IWA. During this time, he was accused by rival socialists of being a businessman, of corruption and even of collaborating with the Bourbons. This did not prevent him from continuing his activities, which culminated in the re-establishment of a southern Italian section of the IWA and his agitation for insurrection in the region.

The suppression of the 1877 Benevento insurrection made organising more difficult for Gambuzzi, whose attempts to reorganise the workers' movement around his social studies circle were unsuccessful. Embittered, he began attacking republicans of La Spira, and in the 1882 Italian general election, he ran as a candidate for the Far Left. Throughout the 1880s, he continued to attack the Mazzinian republicans and organise the Neapolitan labour movement through his newspaper Gazzetta di Napoli. He frequently criticised the political corruption of local officials and called for the "moral rehabilitation" of Naples by upending the political system. Following a trial for his radical denunciations of the government, on 30 April 1902, Gambuzzi died.

== Bibliography ==
- Brancaccio, Giovanni (1999). "GAMBUZZI, Carlo". Dizionario Biografico degli Italiani. Vol. 52. ISBN 9788812000326. OCLC 467875876.
- Pernicone, Nunzio (1993). Italian Anarchism, 1864–1892. Princeton University Press. ISBN 0-691-05692-7. LCCN 92-46661.
