= Italian Revolutionary Socialist Party =

Italian Revolutionary Socialist Party Partito Socialista Rivoluzionario Italiano
- Leader: Andrea Costa
- Founded: 24 July 1881
- Dissolved: 15 August 1892
- Merged into: Socialist Party of Italian Workers
- Headquarters: Rimini, Romagna
- Ideology: Revolutionary socialism; Social anarchism
- Political position: Far-left
- National affiliation: Historical Far Left
- Colours: Red
- Chamber of Deputies (1882): 1 / 508

The Italian Revolutionary Socialist Party (Italian: Partito Socialista Rivoluzionario Italiano, PSRI) was a socialist political party in Italy. Formed by the Italian anarchist Andrea Costa, the party's stated aim was a social revolution to establish a dictatorship of the proletariat, although it soon became an electoral platform for Costa. Based in Romagna, the party gained traction among socialists during its conflict with the anarchists, but it ultimately failed to unite Italian socialists under its banner. The formation of a unified Italian Socialist Party was taken over by the Marxist Filippo Turati, who completed its formation in August 1892.

== Background ==
By 1880, the Italian anarchist Andrea Costa had begun to advocate for socialists of all tendencies to unite and constitute a political party, which could participate in elections and win short-term reforms on the way to its final goal of establishing anarchy. Costa's proposal received support from a socialist conference in Bologna and in the newspaper La Plebe, although attempts to hold a conference that year never materialised. His moves to establish a socialist party were widely opposed within the anarchist movement, with Errico Malatesta predicting that Costa's plan would fail and lamenting that he did not focus his efforts elsewhere. In a letter to Amilcare Cipriani, Malatesta declared that Costa had "wanted to unite friends and adversaries, and has found himself going over to the adversaries".

== Establishment ==
In April 1881, Costa established the newspaper Avanti! to promote the establishment of a socialist party. Despite his efforts, he was unable to attract support from other parts of the country, and had to refocus his efforts on creating a regional party in Romagna. On 24 July 1881, at a conference in Rimini, Costa established the Revolutionary Socialist Party of Romagna (Italian: Partito Socialista Rivoluzionario di Romagna; PSRR). The party called for the working class to take power in a social revolution and establish a temporary dictatorship of the proletariat, although its immediate focus would be on supporting socialist candidates in local and general elections. It thus combined evolutionary and revolutionary socialism, believing that institutional obstruction of the general will would lead to a violent insurrection against the state. It also adopted the General Rules of the International Workingmen's Association (IWA).

The new party immediately became a source of contention for Italian anarchists, with Costa's friend Carlo Cafiero fiercely criticising its establishment as a betrayal of revolutionary socialism and calling for violent attacks against Costa. This provoked the majority of former IWA members in Romagna joined the PSRR, with mass defections of the Romagnol anarchist movement towards legalitarian socialism. The Romagnol anarchist Vittorino Valbonesi depicted these new party members as fanatics who could not abide any criticism of their "Duce" (Costa). Carmelo Palladino believed that the establishment of the party had further divided the socialist movement, described Costa as an enemy of the working classes and criticised the cult of personality surrounding him among PSRR members. The anarchist criticisms of the PSRR only served to strengthen the party, and by September 1881, Costa had cut ties with the anarchist movement.

== Growth ==
In the 1882 general election, Costa became the first socialist to be successfully elected to the Italian Chamber of Deputies, as the representative for Ravenna. Although he had always proposed that socialists should run as protest candidates, and that they should not take their seats in parliament, under the advice of Cafiero, he took the oath of office and took his seat. Costa's entry into parliament was vocally criticised by Italian anarchists. On 18 February 1883, Carlo Monticelli organised an anti-Costa rally in Milan, but after Costa appeared at the rally and bested Monticelli in a debate, sympathy for Costa among Lombard socialists began to rise. Monticelli subsequently reversed course and began defending Costa from personal attacks and accusations of bad faith. Tuscan anarchists also began to call for a rapprochement with Costa, and the unification of the Italian socialist movement. Meanwhile, Malatesta called for the opposite, demanding a complete break between the anarchists and the legalitarian socialists, and denouncing Costa as a "traitor" to socialism.

In August 1883, Costa joined Felice Cavallotti's far-left parliamentary alliance, which placed itself in opposition to the government of Agostino Depretis. This provoked an escalation in attacks from the anarchists, with Malatesta challenging Costa to a public debate. On 20 January 1884, 150 socialists arrived in Ravenna to watch the confrontation, but it never took place, as Costa arrived late and requested it be rescheduled. The following day, at a much smaller meeting, Malatesta demanded Costa resign from the alliance, resign from the parliament and give his seat to the radical anarchist Amilcare Cipriani. Costa said he would do so if the PSRR requested it and left the meeting. This catalysed anarchists in Rimini to demand Costa's resignation from parliament; in July 1884, they took control of the city's socialist federation, forced it to secede from the PSRR and unified the anti-Costa opposition into the "International Romagnol Federation".

Meanwhile, at a congress in Forlì on 20 July 1884, the PSRR was transformed into the Italian Revolutionary Socialist Party (Italian: Partito Socialista Rivoluzionario Italiano; PSRI). It now claimed to constitute a national political party, despite its influence still largely being confined to Romagna. As the PSRI grew, Italian anarchists sought to counter its rising influence by reestablishing the Italian Branch of the IWA. At its founding congress in Forlì on 15 March 1885, the Italian IWA denounced the PSRI as a "bourgeois" political party. On 25 April 1886, the PSRI held a conference in Mantua, where it hoped to win over landless farmworkers of the Po Valley to its programme. However, the workers rejected the PSRI platform of political action and instead sought to develop their own agricultural cooperatives. The PSRI's focus on agricultural workers made it difficult to work with the Italian Workers' Party (POI), which focused on urban factory workers. After the POI rejected a proposal to merge with the PSRI, the anarchists sought an anti-parliamentary alliance with the POI.

== Decline ==
By 1887, the PSRI had entered a period of decline, under pressure from the anarchist movement, which contributed to and benefitted from it. The campaign for Costa to be replaced by Cipriani was gaining steam, with Cipriani's multiple election wins in Romagna being annulled, which in turn increased sympathy for him. Many members of the PSRI defected back to anarchism, which once again became the dominant socialist faction throughout Romagna; the PSRI only retained its leading influence in Costa's hometown of Imola. In mid-1887, PSRI member Germanico Piselli began criticising Costa for his alliance with Cavallotti and his lack of support for Cipriani. The following year, he led 300 members of the PSRI in Forlì to break away from the party and reorganise into an anarchist federation.

In the spring of 1890, Malatesta began organising for the establishment of a Socialist Revolutionary Anarchist Party and renewed his collaboration with Cipriani. Malatesta called for a campaign against electoralism, and through Cipriani, met with Costa to request he sign an abstentionist manifesto; Costa, on the other hand, was hoping Malatesta would help him win re-election. In August 1890, Costa convened a socialist congress, with the aim of uniting Italian socialists behind participation in the upcoming election. He invited all socialists who supported electoral action, excluding the anarchists. But the congress was met with hostility from the POI, and consequently, the PSRI was alone at its congress in Ravenna on 18 October 1890. A separate anti-authoritarian congress hosted by Malatesta denounced the PSRI and rejected electoral participation. Malatesta aimed to deprive the PSRI of their voter base in Romagna, and thus prevent any socialist participation in the legislature.

With the PSRI's attempts to unite Italian socialists under its banner having failed, the Marxist Filippo Turati took over the national leadership of the socialist movement. Turati sought to establish a single Italian Socialist Party, unite the Italian labour movement behind scientific socialism and attract middle class intellectuals into its ranks, with the goal of gradually taking state power. In August 1891, he held a congress in Milan, where he brought together representatives of all socialist factions, and secured approval for the establishment of a new workers' party. At a subsequent congress in Genoa, on 14 August 1892, Marxists, members of the POI, anarchists and Costa's PSRI met to discuss the proposal. The congress quickly broke down into two separate congresses, as conflict between the Marxists and anarchists escalated into a split. The Marxist congress founded the Italian Socialist Party (PSI). The PSRI merged into the new party.

== Bibliography ==
- Butta, Fausto (2015). Living Like Nomads: The Milanese Anarchist Movement Before Fascism. Cambridge Scholars Publishing. ISBN 9781443881593.
- Favili, Paolo (2016). The History of Italian Marxism: From its Origins to the Great War. Brill. ISBN 9789004325432.
- Lampa, Roberto (2010). "Different Destinies in Assonant Circumstances : Marx's Reception in Italy and Spain (1870-1923)". Pensiero Economico Italiano. XVIII (2): 11–36. doi:10.1400/170085. ISSN 1724-0581.
- Marcobelli, Elisa (2021). Internationalism Toward Diplomatic Crisis: The Second International and French, German and Italian Socialists. Palgrave Macmillan. ISBN 978-3-030-74083-2.
- Mascat, Jamila M. H. (2021). "Portrait of a Socialist Lady". The Monopoly of Man. MIT Press. ISBN 9780262045391.
- Pernicone, Nunzio (1993). Italian Anarchism, 1864–1892. Princeton University Press. ISBN 0-691-05692-7. LCCN 92-46661.
- Rozenblatt, Daphne (2017). "Work: Disease, Cure, and National Ethos in Modern Italy". Social History of Medicine. 31 (2): 348–372. doi:10.1093/shm/hkx008.
