= Emilio Covelli =

Italian anarchist (1846–1915)

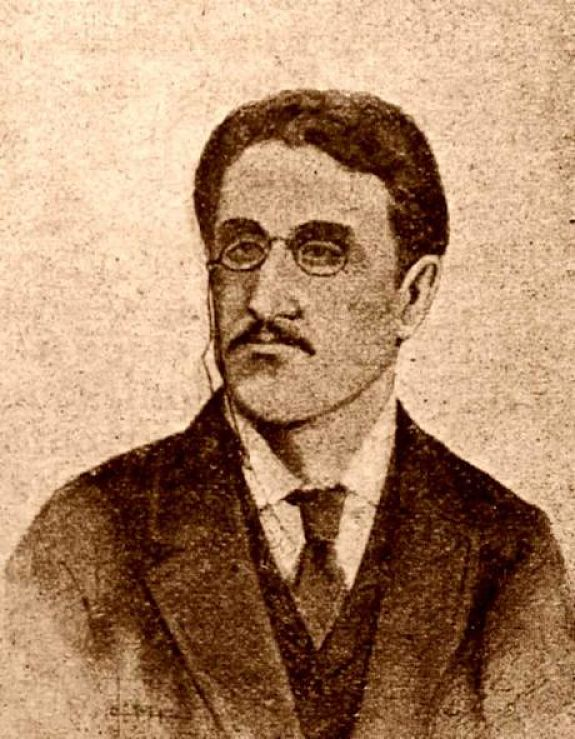
- Born: 5 August 1846; Trani (present-day Italy)
- Died: 15 August 1915 (aged 69); Nocera Inferiore, Kingdom of Italy
- Occupation(s): Anarchist revolutionary and political activist

Emilio Covelli (1846–1915) was an Italian anarchist and socialist who together with Carlo Cafiero was one of the most important figures in the early socialist movement in Italy, a member of the International Workingmen's Association, or "First International". He lived in exile in Paris for a while, returning to Italy for reasons of health, and dying in the psychiatric hospital in Nocera Inferiore.

== Early life ==
Covelli was born into an aristocratic family in Trani (Apulia). He received his secondary education at a seminary in Molfetta (where he was in the same class as Cafiero), but after studying law at Naples University and then in Heidelberg and Berlin (where he studied under Eugen Dühring), he moved towards socialism, leaving his bourgeois origins behind him.

== Activism ==
His extensive knowledge of German socialist literature (Dühring, Marx, etc.) was fundamental in introducing the ideas of "scientific socialism" into his own country, particularly through his 1874 work L’economia politica e la scienza, one of the earliest pieces of socialist theoretical writings in Italian. Later, in 1908, he published Economia e Socialismo.

He joined the Naples branch of the International in 1875, becoming an important influence within it and also contributing to the newspaper, "La Campana". Together with Carlo Cafiero, Errico Malatesta and Andrea Costa, he was instrumental in moving the Italian anarchist movement away from the collectivism it professed in the days of Mikhail Bakunin in order to adopt the communist formula "From each according to ability, to each according to need". At the 1876 congress of the Italian Federation of the International in Florence-Tosi, it was these four who were responsible for the adoption of the anarchist communist programme.

In 1877, together with Malatesta, Cafiero and others, he participated in the unsuccessful Benevento uprising, following which he moved to Genoa, where he founded branches of the International. After a spell in prison, he left the country, moving to London first, where he launched and edited a magazine, "Redattori della Lotta!", and then Geneva, where he founded the "I Malfattori" magazine, before returning once more to Italy.

He turned to more radical methods of propaganda by the deed in the 1880s and was forced to live on the run for several years, suffering a mental breakdown in 1884. After his release from the Como psychiatric hospital, he moved abroad, living at various times in Switzerland, Greece and Turkey. The last 23 years of his life were spent in a series of mental institutions and he eventually died in the same hospital as Cafiero, in Nocera Inferiore.

The commemorative plaque on Palazzo Covelli, the family home, in Trani bears his words: "I shall not sell myself either to any government or to any party... I have craved misery, persecution and slander. I have lost everything, there remains only what is me".
