= Carnesecchi =

Carnesecchi is a surname. Notable people with the surname include:

- Dante Carnesecchi (1892–1921), Italian individualist anarchist
- Marco Carnesecchi (born 2000), Italian footballer
- Pietro Carnesecchi (1508–1567), Italian humanist
