= Franco Serantini =

Italian anarchist (1951–1972)

Franco (Francesco) Serantini (16 July 1951 – 7 May 1972) was an Italian anarchist.

== Biography ==
He was born in Cagliari and spent his childhood in a foster family and in institutions, sometimes under a semi-free regime. After graduating from the Fibonacci state school, he started developing leftist political ideas, and eventually ended up in the Pisa-based anarchist group "Giuseppe Pinelli". He was active in various initiatives of the anarchist and anti-fascist movements. On 5 May 1972, he took part in an anti-fascist demonstration which was attacked by the police and, among others, he was heavily beaten and arrested. During his interrogation, he showed signs of unease which the police officers along with the judges and doctors did not consider serious. On 7 May, he was found in a state of coma in his cell and a little later he died in the prison's emergency room.
