= Fascio Operaio =

- Formation: November 27, 1871; 154 years ago
- Headquarters: Bologna
- Leader: Erminio Pescatori

The Fascio Operaio was a clandestine association of free thinkers founded in the Tre Zucchette tavern of Bologna on 27 November 1871 by a group of Garibaldian veterans of the French campaign led by Erminio Pescatori.

The purpose of the association was the emancipation of the people from ignorance and poverty. From the beginning, Giuseppe Garibaldi and a young Andrea Costa joined the Fascio Operaio. The Fascio was the first Emilian section of the Lega Internazionale dei Lavoratori. Alceste Faggioli and the headquarters was located at 1137 Via Castiglione on the second floor of the palazzo Pepoli. The association already collected more than 500 members at the end of the year, on 27 December it issued the first issue of the weekly Il Fascio operaio directed by Erminio Pescatori while the first regional congress took place in Bologna from 17 to 21 March 1872.

With these words Faggioli described his idea of the worker association:

We (Craft Worker) have formed sections of crafts, for example blacksmiths, masonry, chapels etc. All these sections having different interests come together separately to deal with their business. However, the individual sections are tightened by the economic constraint, so that if the chapels make a strike, the other sections help them with money; So the strikes are profitable and at the same time the masses are used to revolutions. We are waiting for that day that we do not want the proletariat to get stuck, but in the meantime, it has the greatest benefits that the strike and the association derive from.

== See also ==
- Secret society
