= Mikhail Sazhin (revolutionary) =

Russian revolutionary (1845–1934)

- Михаил Сажин
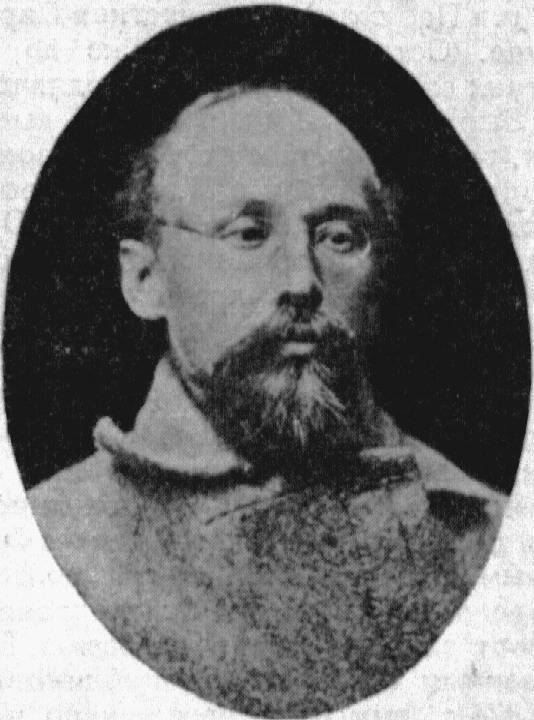
- Mikhail Sazhin (1881)
- Born: 29 October 1845; Izhevsk, Vyatka, Russian Empire
- Died: 8 January 1934 (aged 88); Moscow, Russian SFSR, Soviet Union
- Other names: Armand Ross
- Education: Saint Petersburg State Institute of Technology
- Movement: Anarchism in Russia
- Spouse: Evgenia Figner

Mikhail Petrovich Sazhin (Russian: Михаил Петрович Сажин; 1845–1934), also known by the pseudonym Armand Ross, was a Russian revolutionary anarchist. An activist during his years as a student, he was expelled and exiled for his revolutionary activities, forcing him to flee the country to Switzerland, where he became a disciple of the anarchist Mikhail Bakunin. During the 1870s, he participated in a series of uprisings, including those of the Lyon and Paris Communes, the 1874 Bologna insurrection and Herzegovina uprising, before returning to Russia in order to ignite an insurrection there. He was arrested for smuggling revolutionary literature across the border and tried as part of the Trial of the 193, which resulted in him getting exiled to Siberia. He spent the subsequent decades working in a number of steamship companies throughout Russia, eventually returning to European Russia and participating in a number of radical publishing ventures. He spent his final years in Moscow, attempting to publish Bakunin's literary works and working as an activist for the Society of Former Political Prisoners and Exiled Settlers.

== Biography ==
Mikhail Petrovich Sazhin was born on 29 [O.S. 17] October 1845, in Izhevsk, in the Vyatka Governorate of the Russian Empire, into the family of a merchant. He received an education in Buy, in the Kostroma Governorate, and in 1858, he moved to Saint Petersburg and enrolled at the Institute of Technology. In 1864, he joined a self-education circle at the institute, and in 1865, he was tried for lithographing a copy of Ludwig Büchner's Force and Matter, but was acquitted. He left Saint Petersburg that year, wanted by police in connection with the case against Dmitry Karakozov, due to his connection with Ivan Khudyakov.

He returned to Saint Petersburg in 1867 and re-enrolled at the institute. He participated in the student unrest of that year as a leading activist, for which he was expelled, arrested and deported to Vologda. He appealed for permission to return to the capital and complete his education, but this request was rejected by the authorities. On 17 June 1869, he decided to flee the country, moving through Ukraine and crossing into Austria-Hungary, before heading onto the United States, where he worked in factories and attempted to organise Russian emigrant workers. In June 1870, he moved to Geneva, where he lived under the pseudonym "Armand Ross". There he worked together with Sergey Nechayev and Mikhail Bakunin, becoming the personal secretary of the latter.

In 1870, he moved to Zürich and organised a Russian colony there, promoting Bakunin's anarchist philosophy to Russian students. He then went on to participate in the uprising of the Lyon Commune, which was led by Bakunin. After the formation of the Paris Commune, he left for the French capital, where he participated in the commune until its suppression, when he returned to Zürich.

Back in Switzerland, he became a key supporter of Bakunin in his factional dispute with Pyotr Lavrov, later joining the Jura Federation of the International Workingmen's Association (IWA) and participating in its Congresses as a delegate. In 1873, Sazhin and other anarchists established a printing press, where they published a number of Bakunin's works including Statism and Anarchy and organised their smuggling into the Russian Empire. The following year, the Tsarist authorities summoned him to return to Russia, but he ignored the summons and remained in Switzerland. During this time, he made contact with Isaac Pavlovsky's revolutionary circle in Taganrog and participated in Bakunin's failed Bologna insurrection. In 1875, he participated in the Herzegovina uprising as a member of the foreign legion, fighting within it until the end of the year, when he returned to Switzerland.

Together with Sergey Stepnyak-Kravchinsky, German Lopatin and Dmitrii Klements, he began plotting to carry out an insurrection in the Ural region of the Russian Empire, himself returning clandestinely to Russia in March 1876. Over the subsequent month, he smuggled revolutionary literature into the Russian Empire over the border with Germany, for which he was arrested on 24 April 1876 while carrying a false passport. As part of the Trial of the 193, in 1877, he was charged with distributing revolutionary literature and disobeying the Tsarist authorities. As he refused to answer the court's questions, he was removed from the courtroom while the trial proceeded. On 23 January 1878, he was found guilty and sentenced to five years of penal labour in exile. He made several unsuccessful attempts to appeal his sentence, but in July 1878, he was transferred to Kharkiv, where he was held in prison. In May 1881, he was transferred to a forced settlement in Siberia, first being placed in Kultuk then in Kirensk, in the Irkutsk Governorate, where he married fellow revolutionary Evgenia Figner. In 1886, he moved to Balagansk and was granted permission to join a nearby peasant commune the following year.

He then began working for the Baikal steamship company and, during the 1890s, he took over the management of gold mines in Yakutia. He later obtained permission to move to Western Siberia and settled in Tyumen, where he worked again for a local steamship company. At the turn of the 20th century, he moved to Riga then Nizhny Novgorod, where he also worked at a local steamship company. During the 1905 Russian Revolution, he participated in the local revolutionary movement. The following year, he moved to Saint Petersburg and began collaborating on the Narodnik periodical Russkoye Bogatstvo. In 1916, he moved to the North Caucasus, where he lived until 1920. He then moved to Moscow, where he became a member of the Society of Former Political Prisoners and Exiled Settlers and finally retired, receiving his pension in 1931.

During his later years in Moscow, he attempted to publish Bakunin's works, but came up against difficulties under the new Bolshevik government, particularly after a personal conflict with David Riazanov. Mikhail Sazhin died in Moscow on 8 January 1934. His funeral was attended by many Russian anarchists, but only Soviet officials were permitted to speak.

== Publications ==
- Sazhin, Mikhail Petrovich (1927). Воспоминания о М. А. Бакунине [Memories of Bakunin] (in Russian). Moscow: Изд-во Всесоюзного о-ва политкаторжан и сс.-поселенцев.

== Bibliography ==
- Enckell, Marianne (6 June 2021). "SAJINE Michel (SAŽIN Mikhail Petrovitch) dit Armand ROSS". Le Maitron (in French).
- Shilov, A. A.; Karnaukhova, M. G., eds. (1932). "Сажин, Михаил Петрович" [Sazhin, Mikhail Petrovich]. Деятели революционного движения в России (in Russian). Vol. 4. Moscow: Society of Former Political Prisoners and Exiled Settlers. pp. 1405–1409. OCLC 749336544.
