= Olimpia Kutuzova =

Russian political activist (1845–c.1914)

- Олимпия Кутузова
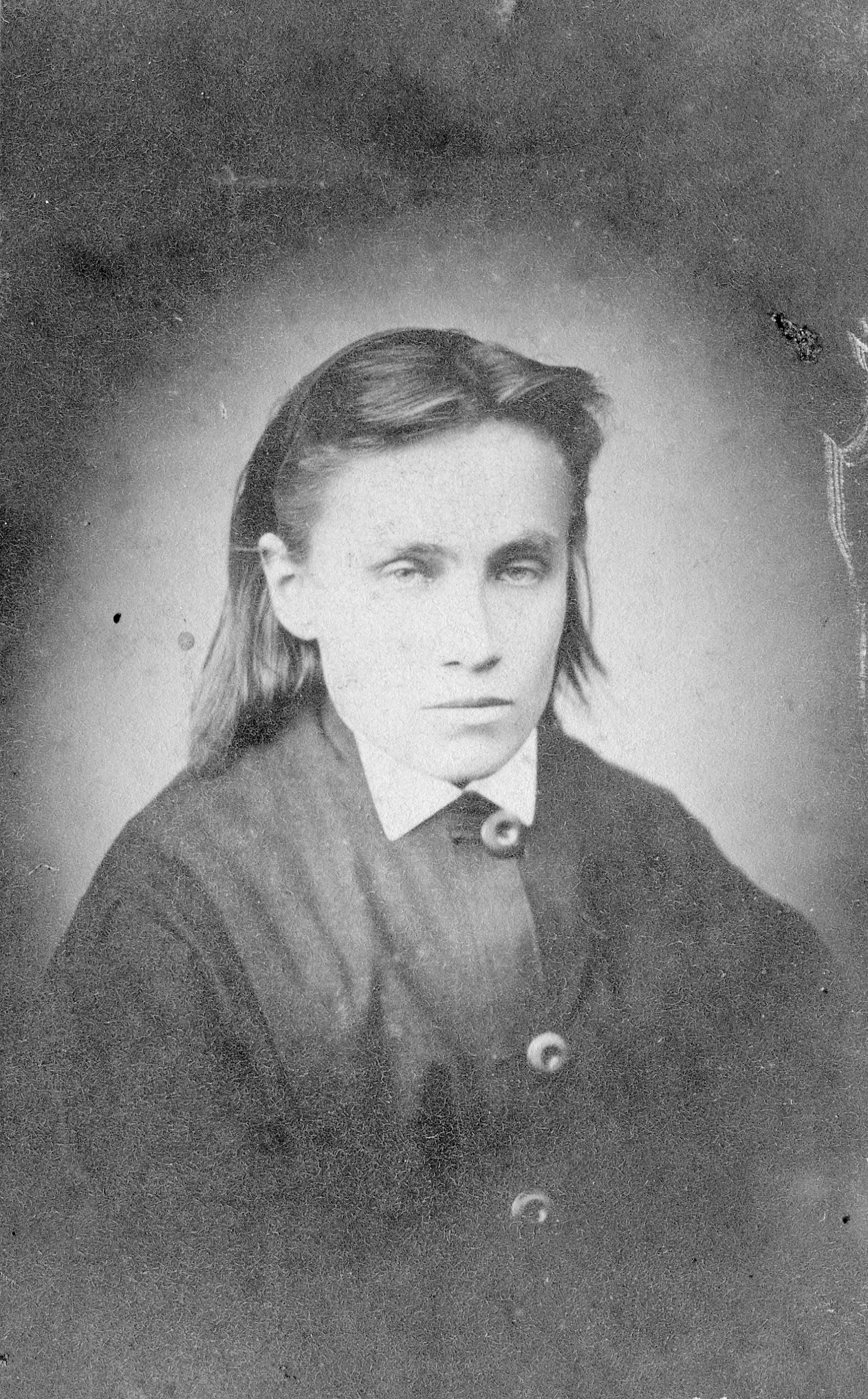
- Born: 1845; Lyalino, Tver, Russian Empire
- Died: c. 1914 (aged 68–69); Russian Empire
- Occupation: Teacher
- Movement: Narodniks
- Spouse: Carlo Cafiero

Olimpiada Evgrafovna Kutuzova (Russian: Олимпиада Евграфовна Кутузова; 1845 – c.1914), also known as Olimpia Kutuzova Cafiero (Russian: Олимпия Кутузова Кафьеро), was a Russian Narodnik. Facing arrest for her revolutionary activities, she married the Italian anarchist Carlo Cafiero in order to seek political asylum abroad. After a year in exile, she returned to Russia, where she educated peasant children and participated in the Going to the People movement, which brought her again to the attention of authorities.

Suspected of participating in the assassination of Alexander II of Russia, she was exiled to Siberia, but managed to escape to Italy in order to aid her husband who had been interned in a lunatic asylum. After a few years caring for Cafiero, her own health declined and she was forced to commit him to another asylum, where he died. Kutuzova returned to Russia, where she fell out of the historical record by the outbreak of World War I.

== Biography ==
Olimpiada Evgrafovna Kutuzova was born into a noble family in Tver, in 1845. By the 1870s, Kutuzova had become involved with the Russian populist movement and faced arrest for her subversive activities. She moved to Locarno, Switzerland, and joined the anarchist circle of Mikhail Bakunin. There she met the young Italian anarchist Carlo Cafiero, with whom she formed a strong platonic friendship. In March 1874, she went back to Russia in order to see her dying mother, but when she attempted to return to Switzerland, the Tsarist authorities denied her a passport due to her revolutionary activities. Cafiero immediately went to St. Petersburg and married her at the Italian Consulate, which conferred upon her Italian citizenship and allowed her passage to Switzerland.

She moved to Italy together with Cafiero, but by 1875, she had left her husband and returned to Russia, in order to participate in the "Going to the People" campaign. Kutuzova worked as a teacher in Pskov, then as a doctor's assistant in Simbirsk, where she met the Narodnik revolutionary Sophia Perovskaya. She then made another attempt to "go to the people". Travelling under the guise of a wanderer, she tried to agitate in the Volga region. Then Kutuzova returned home to Tver, where she reopened a school for peasant children without the permission of the authorities. The school was soon closed by the authorities, but Kutuzova finished the school year, teaching the children in her home. In May 1879, she was arrested again and expelled abroad as a "foreign national". She briefly reunited with Cafiero, before returning to Russia. After the assassination of Alexander II of Russia in March 1881, she was arrested on suspicion of participating and deported to Siberia. There she found out that Cafiero had been interned in a lunatic asylum in Florence and decided to flee Russia in order to aid him.

She was reunited with Cafiero in 1886, securing his transfer to an asylum in Imola; he was released into her care in November 1887, but his condition remained unstable. The couple moved to Cafiero's family home in Barletta, where his health briefly appeared to improve, but he never fully recovered his sanity. Kutuzova committed him to another asylum in Nocera Inferiore, where he died of tuberculosis in 1892.

Kutuzova's own mental health had also deteriorated during this time and she was forced to return to Russia, where she disappeared from the historical record by the outbreak of World War I.

== Bibliography ==
- Drake, Richard (2009). "Carlo Cafiero". Apostles and Agitators: Italy's Marxist Revolutionary Tradition. Harvard University Press. ISBN 978-0-674-03432-7.
- Guerrini, Martina (May 2020). "Olimpia Kutuzova Cafiero, una populista russa". Novantatre Per Cento (in Italian). No. 16.
- Pernicone, Nunzio (1993). Italian Anarchism, 1864–1892. Princeton University Press. ISBN 0-691-05692-7. LCCN 92-46661.
