= Andrea Costa =

Italian politician (1851–1910)

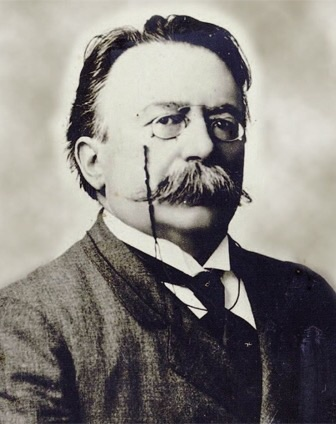

Member of Chamber of Deputies
- In office 22 November 1882 – 19 January 1910
- Constituency: Ravenna

Personal details
- Born: 29 November 1851 Imola, Papal States
- Died: 19 January 1910 (aged 58) Imola, Italy
- Party: PSRI (1881–1893); PSI (1893–1910)
- Occupation: Politician

Andrea Costa (29 November 1851 – 19 January 1910) was an Italian socialist politician. Among the founders of the Italian socialist movement, he was the first socialist deputy in Italian history.

== Biography ==
Andrea Costa was born on 29 November 1851, in the Romagnol city of Imola, into a poor Catholic family. In 1870, he graduated from secondary school and moved to the regional capital of Bologna, where he worked as a clerk to pay for his education at the University of Bologna.

=== Anarchist activism ===
During his years as a student, he joined the International Workingmen's Association (IWA), became a follower of the Russian anarchist Mikhail Bakunin and adopted the philosophy of revolutionary socialism. In August 1872, Costa presided over an Italian Congress of the IWA in Rimini, where delegates voted to split from the Marxists and affiliate themselves with the Anti-authoritarian International. Later that year, Costa attended the St. Imier Congress as an Italian delegate. During this period, Costa established the anarchist publications Fascio Operaio and Il Martello. Under Costa's influence, anarchism spread rapidly throughout the Romagna region.

The Panic of 1873 led to a period of economic depression and rising social conflict in Italy. In response to the rising socio-economic crisis, Costa organised the 1874 Bologna insurrection. The insurrection was intended to start in Romagna and spread throughout the rest of the country, but it quickly collapsed. Already aware of the planned uprising, the Italian authorities arrested Costa before the insurgents had even mobilised. He was subsequently imprisoned for his role in the attempted uprising. After 18 months in prison, he was acquitted of the charges against him and released.

Following the defeat of the 1874 insurrection, Costa began reevaluating his political ideology. He was fiercely criticised by many of his comrades for "excessive optimism" in revolution, which led him to become disillusioned in the prospects of revolutionary change through conspiracy and insurrection, and to advocate for gradualism. In 1877, when Carlo Cafiero made plans for an insurrection in Southern Italy, Costa refused to support it, thinking the conditions were not right and the plan poorly-made. He instead remained in Romagna, waiting to see if it would be successful before taking action. After the suppression of the insurrection, Costa fled to Switzerland in order to escape the political repression that followed. By this time, he had completely lost faith in revolutionary change, but resisted fully adopting a legalistic perspective and instead sought a middle path between revolutionary and reformist socialism. During his exile, he met and married the Russian revolutionary Anna Kuliscioff, who influenced him to complete his move away from anarchism towards reformist socialism.

In August 1879, Costa published the open letter "To My Friends in Romagna", in the socialist newspaper La Plebe. In the letter, he publicly announced his ideological conversion, which influenced many other Romagnol anarchists to adopt reformist socialism. This attracted strong criticism from Carlo Cafiero, who had remained a staunch partisan of insurrectionary anarchism. He denounced Costa's advocacy of participation in parliamentary politics, which he equated with an abandonment of socialism and support for the capitalist status quo. The following year, Cafiero openly decried Costa as an "apostate" who had changed his political beliefs to advance his career, and made public death threats against him.

=== Socialist political career ===
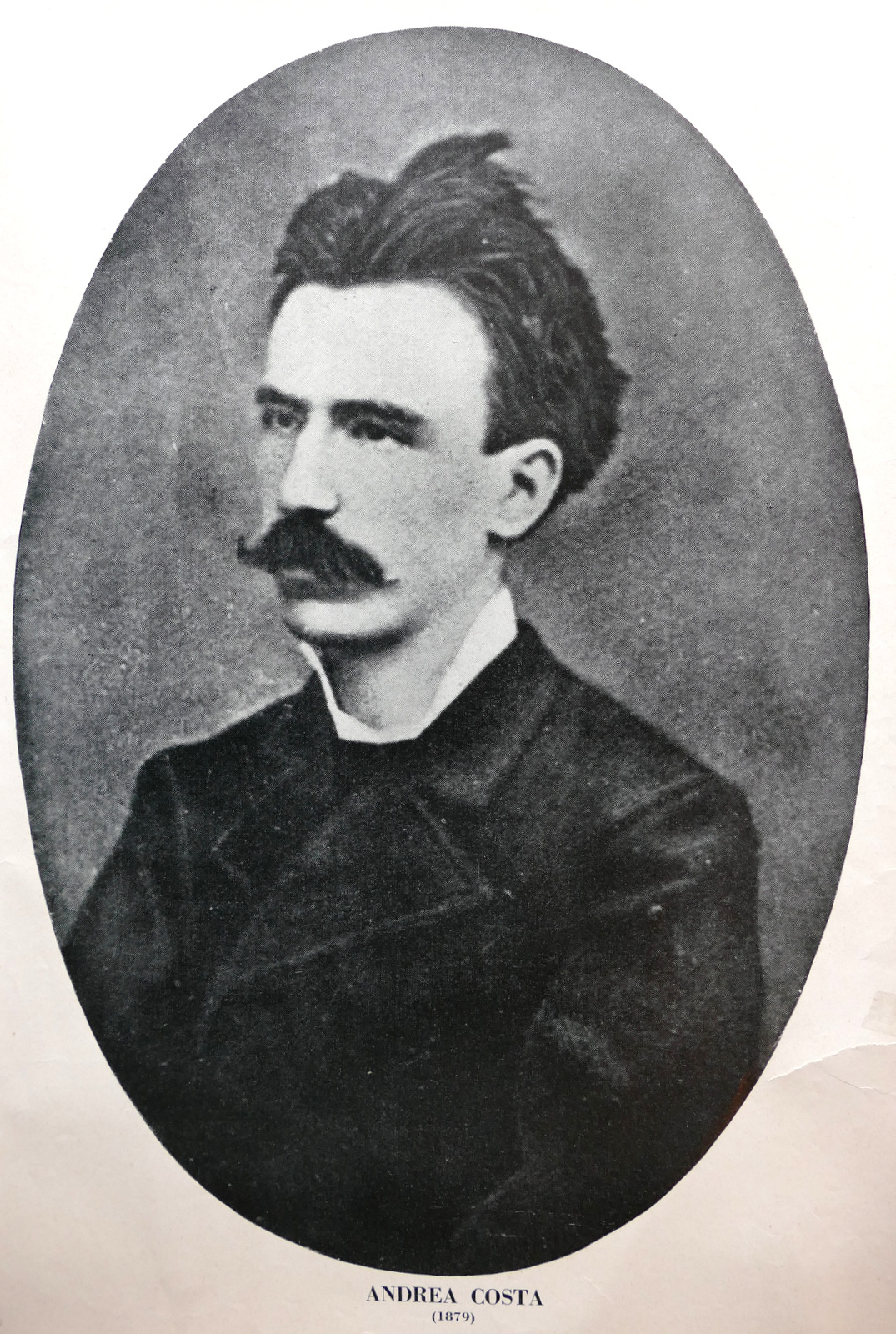
Andrea Costa in 1879.

In 1880, Costa returned to Italy and established the Rivista Internazionale del Socialismo. The following year, he established the weekly newspaper Avanti!. In August 1881, Costa established the Revolutionary Socialist Party of Romagna (PSRR) in Rimini. In the 1882 Italian general election, Costa was elected to the Chamber of Deputies, as a representative for Ravenna. This made him the first socialist to be elected to the Italian Parliament.

During his time in parliament, Costa pushed for the advancement of social legislation and campaigned against the rise of Italian colonialism. While using parliament as a platform for socialist ideas, he also remained committed to supporting extra-parliamentary activity such as strike actions. He oversaw the reorganisation of the Romagnol labour movement, encouraging the development of trade unions and worker cooperatives. He was also initiated into Freemasonry on 25 September 1883, in the Rienzi lodge in Rome, and became deputy grand master of the Grand Orient of Italy.

Costa sought to unify the disparate regional groupings of the Italian socialist movement into a national political party, but his efforts were frustrated by the workerists of Milan, who insisted party membership be restricted to the working class. Although Costa finally expanded the PSRR into the Italian Revolutionary Socialist Party (PSRI) in 1884, it was still little more than a regional party based in Romagna. Around this time, Kulliscioff left Costa for Filippo Turati. In 1886, Costa backed the establishment of La Rivista italiana del socialismo by Antonio Lanzoni.

In 1892, Costa participated in the Congress of Genoa, which established the Italian Socialist Party (PSI). Although he joined the party in December 1893, he found his humanitarian brand of socialism out of step with the predominantly Marxist and social-democratic middle class politicians of the new party. He continued to give speeches on behalf of the party and was repeatedly recognised as a leader at its congresses, but as the party fell into factional infighting, he slowly distanced himself from its other members. In 1906, Costa presided over the party's Rome Congress, where he had to repeatedly demand order during a speech by the revolutionary syndicalist Arturo Labriola. In 1909, Costa was elected as vice president of the Chamber of Deputies.

=== Death and legacy ===
On 19 January 1910, Costa died in his hometown of Imola. The Italian socialist Alessandro Mussolini was strongly influenced by Costa, prompting him to make one of his son Benito Mussolini's middle names "Andrea", alongside his other middle name of "Amilcare" in honour of fellow Italian socialist Amilcare Cipriani.

== Bibliography ==
- Bosworth, R. J. B. (2010). Mussolini (New ed.). London: Bloomsbury Acad. pp. 35–37. ISBN 978-0-340-98173-3.
- Clark, Martin (2014). "The subversives". Modern Italy, 1871 to the Present. Routledge. pp. 84–109. ISBN 9781317866039.
- Drake, Richard (2003). Apostles and Agitators: Italy's Marxist Revolutionary Tradition. Harvard University Press. ISBN 0-674-01036-1.
- Gramsci, Antonio (2011). Prison Notebooks. Vol. 2. Translated by Buttigieg, Joseph A. Columbia University Press. pp. 413n5. ISBN 9780231105934.
- Manfredi, Marco (2009). "Costa, Andrea (1851-1910)". In Ness, Immanuel (ed.). The International Encyclopedia of Revolution and Protest. pp. 1–2. doi:10.1002/9781405198073.wbierp0405. ISBN 978-1-4051-8464-9.
- Steenson, Gary P. (1991). After Marx, Before Lenin: Marxism and Socialist Working-Class Parties in Europe, 1884-1914. University of Pittsburgh Pre. ISBN 9780822976738.
