= Letino =

- Comune
- Comune di Letino
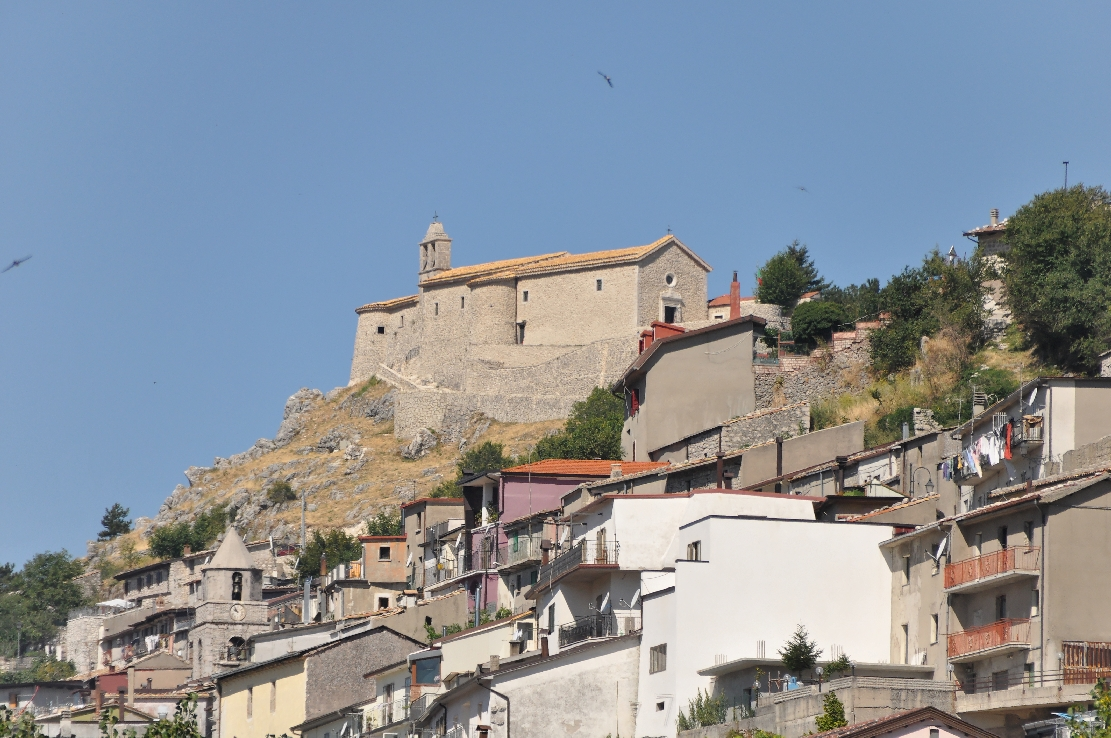

- Coat of arms

- Location within Italy Location within Campania
- Coordinates: 41°27′N 14°15′E
- Country: Italy
- Region: Campania
- Province: Province of Caserta (CE)

Government
  - Mayor: Pasquale Orsi

Area
  - Total: 31.59 km^{2} (12.20 sq mi)
- Elevation: 1,050 m (3,440 ft)

Population (31 March 2017)
  - Total: 707
  - Density: 22.4/km^{2} (58.0/sq mi)
- Demonym: Letinesi
- Time zone: UTC+1 (CET)
  - Summer (DST): UTC+2 (CEST)
- Postal code: 81010
- Dialing code: 0823
- Website: Official website

Letino (Campanian: Letinë) is a comune and small village in the province of Caserta, in Campania, southern Italy.

It was one of the villages liberated by the Italian Libertarian Communist Insurrection of 1877 by Errico Malatesta, Carlo Cafiero, Pietro Cesare Ceccarelli, the Russian Stepniak and 30 other comrades. Another village in the same province, Gallo Matese, was also involved.
