= 1874 Bologna insurrection plot =

Failed anarchist insurrection in Italy

In August 1874, the Italian government foiled an insurrectionary plot by Bakuninist anarchists in Bologna, Italy.

== Planning ==
Anarchist Mikhail Bakunin plotted an insurrection in Italy to hasten an uprising that he and his adherents felt was already imminent with declining economic conditions. Carlo Cafiero purchased 250 rifles and pistols in preparation for the uprising. Bakunin and Cafiero created a national plan of action with Andrea Còsta and Errico Malatesta. They envisioned spontaneous revolutionary uprisings across the country, extending from Bologna. Cafiero wrote a propaganda statement heralding redemption for Italian peasants. Còsta was the head organizer and Bakunin would lead the Bologna insurrection.

In preparation, Costa and Cafiero created the Comitato Italiano per la Rivoluzione Sociale (CIRS) in December 1873 as an extension of the Bakunin Revolutionary Socialist Alliance.

== Arrest and aftermath ==
The Italian government, with advance notice from peasants who rejected the Bakuninists, easily arrested Còsta before the insurrection could begin. Bakunin, disguised as a priest, fled Italy, and the other leaders were jailed. It was a major setback for the Italian anarchist movement.

Cafiero missed the failed insurrection, having been in Russia arranging to marry the revolutionary Olimpia Kutuzova since earlier in the year. While the marriage was to grant her Western asylum, rather than for love, her detention as a subversive complicated his action. The failure of the insurrection strained his otherwise highly favorable relationship with Bakunin.

== Bibliography ==
- Drake, Richard (2009). Apostles and Agitators: Italy's Marxist Revolutionary Tradition. Harvard University Press. ISBN 978-0-674-03432-7.
- Pernicone, Nunzio (1993). "Insurrection and Repression, 1874-1876". Italian Anarchism, 1864–1892. Princeton University Press. pp. 82–105. ISBN 978-0-691-05692-0. OCLC 27267053.
