= Banda del Matese =

1870s Italian insurrectionary group

The Banda del Matese was a group of Italian republicans affiliated with the Italian First International who plotted an insurgent rebellion in the Matese mountains in 1877. The group of 26 men included later anarchist leaders (Carlo Cafiero, Errico Malatesta), veterans of Garibaldi (Pietro Ceccarelli, Vincenzo Farina), and Russian revolutionary Stepniak. Inspired by the 1875 rediscovery of Carlo Pisacane's writings, the group planned a rebellion through propaganda by deed in which they would occupy buildings, upset rail travel and communication, and encourage property redistribution as a means of showing their group's dedication to sociopolitical change. They surrendered to the military after six days. The group was acquitted in 1878 and their means of propaganda was effective, but their campaign had proven the new limitations of guerrilla tactics in light of technical advances.
