= Dante Carnesecchi =

Italian anarchist (1892–1921)

Dante Carnesecchi (12 March 1892 – 29 March 1921) was an Italian individualist anarchist.

Born in Arcola, he was active in the anarchist movement in La Spezia and worked with Renzo Novatore. He was arrested in October 1921 and was released after six months. He was assassinated in an ambush by 7 carabinieri at Dermo d'Arcola.
