= Carlo Pisacane =

Italian socialist revolutionary (1818–1857)

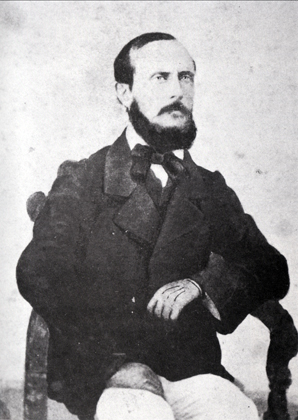
- Born: August 22, 1818; Naples
- Died: July 2, 1857 (aged 38); Sapri, Campania
- Occupations: Soldier, educator
- Known for: Propaganda of the deed

Carlo Pisacane, Duke of San Giovanni (22 August 1818 – 2 July 1857) was an Italian patriot and one of the first Italian socialist thinkers. He was an early advocate of propaganda by deed, arguing that violence was necessary not only to draw attention to, or generate publicity for, a cause, but also to inform, educate, and ultimately rally the masses behind the revolution.

== Biography ==
Pisacane was born in Naples on 22 August 1818 to an impoverished noble family, and he entered the Neapolitan army in 1839; but having become imbued with Mazzinian ideas he emigrated in 1847, and after a short stay in England and France served in the French army in Algeria.

The revolution of 1848 recalled him to Italy; he played a part in the brief Roman Republic, and was an instrumental part of the war commission in the defence of the city. After its capture by the French, he again went into exile, first to London and then to Genoa, maintaining himself by teaching.

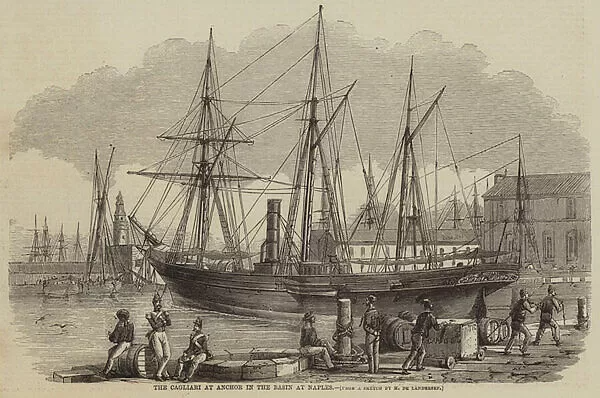
The Cagliari at Anchor in the Basin at Naples, Illustrated Times 1858

Pisacane regarded the rule of the House of Savoy as no better than that of Austria. When Mazzini, undeterred by the failure of the abortive Milan rising on 6 February 1853, determined to organize an expedition to provoke a rising in the Neapolitan kingdom, Pisacane offered himself for the task, and sailed from Genoa with a few followers (including Giovanni Nicotera) on board the steamer Cagliari on 25 June 1857.

They landed on the island of Ponza, where the guards were overpowered and some hundreds of prisoners liberated, and on 28 of the same month arrived at Sapri in Campania and attempted to reach the Cilento. But hardly any assistance from the inhabitants was forthcoming, and the invaders were quickly overpowered, Pisacane himself being killed. He died 2 July 1857.

== Propaganda of the deed ==
Pisacane was a pioneering advocate of propaganda of the deed, arguing that "ideas result from deeds, not the latter from the former, and the people will not be free when they are educated, but educated when they are free." He argued that violence was necessary not only to draw attention to, or generate publicity for, a cause, but also to inform, educate, and ultimately rally the masses behind the revolution. These ideas have exerted compelling influence on rebels and terrorist alike ever since.

He was an atheist.

Benito Mussolini was heavily influenced by Pisacane's revolutionary ideas and ideals to achieve political goals.
