= 1882 Italian general election =

- 29 October 1882 (first round); 5 November 1882 (second round)

All 508 seats in the Chamber of Deputies 255 seats needed for a majority
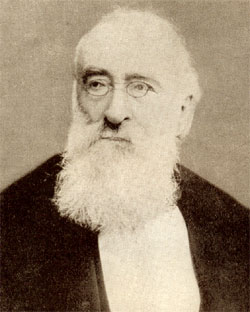

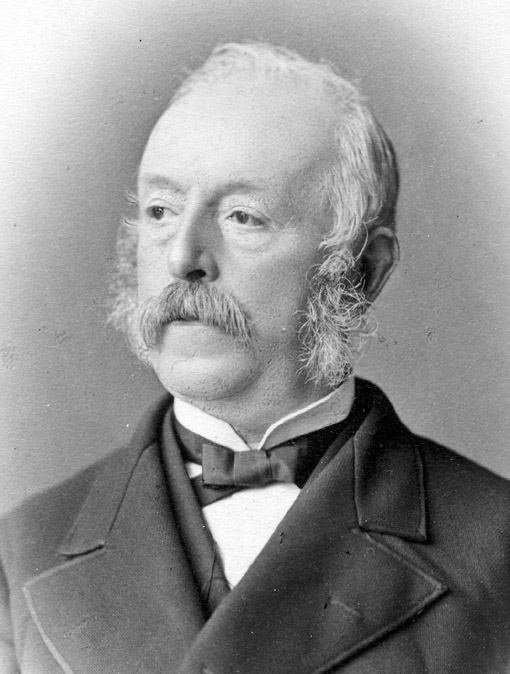

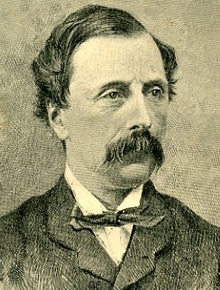

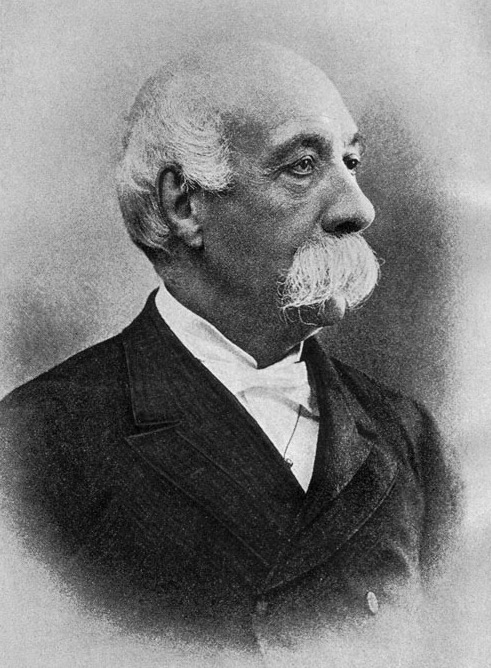
| | Majority party | Minority party |
|---|---|---|
| Leader | Agostino Depretis | Marco Minghetti |
| Party | Historical Left | Historical Right |
| Seats won | 289 | 147 |
| Seat change | ▲71 | ▼24 |
| | Third party | Fourth party |
| Leader | Agostino Bertani | Francesco Crispi |
| Party | Historical Far Left | Dissident Left |
| Seats won | 44 | 19 |
| Seat change | New | ▼100 |
- Constituencies used for the elections
Prime Minister before election
Agostino Depretis
Historical Left
Elected Prime Minister
Agostino Depretis
Historical Left

General elections were held in Italy on 29 October 1882, with a second round of voting on 5 November. The "ministerial" left-wing bloc emerged as the largest in Parliament, winning 289 of the 508 seats.

== Electoral system ==
Shortly before the elections the voting age was lowered from 25 to 21 and the tax requirement lowered from ₤40 to ₤19.80, whilst men with three years of primary education were exempted from it. This resulted in the number of eligible voters increasing from 621,896 at the 1880 elections to 2,017,829. The electoral system was changed from one based on single-member constituencies to one based on small multi-member constituencies with between two and five seats. Voters had as many votes as there were candidates, except in constituencies with five seats, in which they were limited to four votes. To be elected in the first round a candidate needed an absolute majority of the votes cast and to receive a number of votes equivalent to at least one-eighth of the number registered voters. If a second round was required, the number of candidates going through was double the number of seats available.

== Campaign ==
The Historical Left was led by the Prime Minister of Italy, Agostino Depretis, a prominent member of the Italian politics for decades. The bloc of the Historical Right was led by Marco Minghetti, a conservative politician and former Prime Minister, from Bologna. A third large parliamentary group was the Historical Far-Left, a far-left organization led by Agostino Bertani, an Italian revolutionary.

== Parties and leaders ==
| Party | Ideology | Leader |
|---|---|---|
| Historical Left | Liberalism | Agostino Depretis |
| Historical Right | Conservatism | Marco Minghetti |
| Historical Far Left | Radicalism | Agostino Bertani |
| Dissident Left | Progressivism | Francesco Crispi |

== Results ==
The "Ministerial" left-wing bloc emerged as the largest in Parliament, winning 289 of the 508 seats; the Right arrived second with 147 seats. Depretis was confirmed Prime Minister by king Umberto I.

| Party | Votes | % | Seats | +/– |
|---|---|---|---|---|
| Historical Left | | | 289 | +71 |
| Historical Right | | | 147 | −24 |
| Historical Far Left | | | 44 | New |
| Dissident Left | | | 19 | −100 |
| Others | | | 9 | +9 |
| Total | | | 508 | 0 |
| Valid votes | 1,161,205 | 94.88 | | |
| Invalid/blank votes | 62,646 | 5.12 | | |
| Total votes | 1,223,851 | 100.00 | | |
| Registered voters/turnout | 2,017,829 | 60.65 | | |
Source: Nohlen & Stöver
