= Anarchism and the arts =

Anarchism has long had an association with the arts, particularly with visual art, music and literature. This can be dated back to the start of anarchism as a named political concept, and the writings of Pierre-Joseph Proudhon on the French realist painter Gustave Courbet. In an 1857 essay on Courbet, Proudhon set out a principle for art, which he saw in the work of Courbet, that it should show the real lives of the working classes and the injustices working people face at the hands of the bourgeoisie.

The French novelist Émile Zola objected to Proudhon advocating freedom for all in the name of anarchism, but then placing stipulations on artists as to what they should depict in their works. This opened up a division in thinking on anarchist art which is still apparent today, with some anarchist writers and artists advocating a view that art should be propagandistic and used to further the anarchist cause, and others that anarchism should free the artist from the requirements to serve a patron and master, allowing the artist to pursue their own interests and agendas. In recent years the first of these approaches has been argued by writers such as Patricia Leighten and the second by Michael Paraskos.

Significant writers on the relationship between art and anarchism include Proudhon, Peter Kropotkin, Herbert Read, Alex Comfort, George Woodcock, David Goodway, Allan Antliff and Cindy Milstein. Despite this history of a close relationship between art and anarchism, some anarchist writers such as Kropotkin and Read have argued that in an anarchist society the role of the artist would disappear completely as all human activity would become, in itself, artistic. This is a view of art in society that sees creativity as intrinsic to all human activity whereas the effect of bourgeois capitalism has been to strip human life of its creative aspects through industrial standardisation, the atomisation of production processes and the professionalisation of art through the education system.

For some writers, under anarchism artists would not disappear as they would continue to provide an anarchist society with a space in which to continue imagining new ways of understanding and organising reality as well as a space in which to face possible fears. This is similar to Noël Carroll's theory of the function of horror stories and films in current society: "Art-horror is the price we are willing to pay for the revelation of that which is impossible and unknown, of that which violates our conceptual schema."

== Overview ==
About anarchism and the arts, historian David Goodway wrote:

There can be no doubt that one type of intellectual has been consistently drawn to anarchism, placing a premium on absolute freedom and non-interference in their personal and social lives, and belonging, like (Herbert) Read himself, to the artistic and literary avant-gardes. Significant clusters of anarchist painters and writers existed in pre-1914 Italy, New York before and during the First World War and, most impressive of all, the France of the 1880s and 1890s, where the Neo-Impressionists – Camille and Lucien Pissarro, Paul Signac, most probably the enigmatic Georges Seurat – and the Symbolist writers, including one of the greatest poets, Stéphane Mallarmé, all consisted of militant anarchists or sympathizers. In Bohemia the fact that Jaroslav Hašek had been a member of anarchist groups and worked on anarchist journals helps to explain the subversive genius of The Adventures of the Good Soldier Švejk; and Franz Kafka had attended anarchist meetings in Prague, gaining considerable familiarity with anarchist writers and personalities, and actually mentioning Bakunin and Kropotkin in his diary. The German actor, Ret Marut, fleeing from Munich in 1919, recreated himself in Mexico as the still insufficiently appreciated novelist B. Traven.

Anarchism had a significant influence on French Symbolism of the late 19th century, such as that of Stéphane Mallarmé, who was quoted as saying, "Je ne sais pas d'autre bombe, qu'un livre." (I know of no bomb other than a book.) Its ideas infiltrated the cafes and cabarets of turn-of-the-century Paris (see the Drunken Boat #2).

Oscar Wilde's 1891 essay "The Soul of Man under Socialism" has been seen as advocating anarchism. Oscar Wilde "stated in an interview that he believed he was 'something of an Anarchist', but previously said, 'In the past I was a poet and a tyrant. Now I am an anarchist and artist.'"

Many American artists of the early 20th century came under the influence of anarchist ideas, while others embraced anarchism as an ideology. The Ashcan School of American realism included anarchist artists, as well as artists such as Rockwell Kent (1882–1971) and George Bellows (1882–1925) who were influenced by anarchist ideas. Abstract expressionism also included anarchist artists such as Mark Rothko and painters such as Jackson Pollock, who had adopted radical ideas during his experience as a muralist for the Works Progress Administration. Pollock's father had also been a Wobbly.

David Weir has argued in Anarchy and Culture that anarchism only had some success in the sphere of cultural avant-gardism because of its failure as a political movement; cognizant of anarchism's claims to overcome the barrier between art and political activism, he nevertheless suggests that this is not achieved in reality. Weir suggests that for the "ideologue" it might be possible to adapt "aesthetics to politics," but that "from the perspective of the poet" a solution might be to "adapt the politics to the aesthetics." He identifies this latter strategy with anarchism, on account of its individualism. Weir has also suggested that "the contemporary critical strategy of aestheticizing politics" among Marxists such as Fredric Jameson likewise results from the demise of Marxism as a state ideology. "The situation whereby ideology attempts to operate outside of politics has already pointed Marxism toward postmodernist culture, just as anarchism moved into the culture of modernism when it ceased to have political validity."

Late 20th century examples of anarchism and the arts include the collage works by James Koehnline, Freddie Baer, Johan Humyn Being, and others whose work was being published in anarchist magazines such as Anarchy: A Journal of Desire Armed and Fifth Estate. The Living Theatre, a theatrical troupe headed by Judith Malina and Julian Beck, were outspoken about their anarchism, often incorporating anarchistic themes into their performances.

In the 1990s, anarchist interest in the DIY movement and anarcho-punk subcultures also led to the rise of anarchist involvement in creating mail art – "art which uses the postal service in some way" – as well as in the zine movement. Some contemporary anarchists make art in the form of flyposters, stencils, and radical puppets.

== Visual art ==
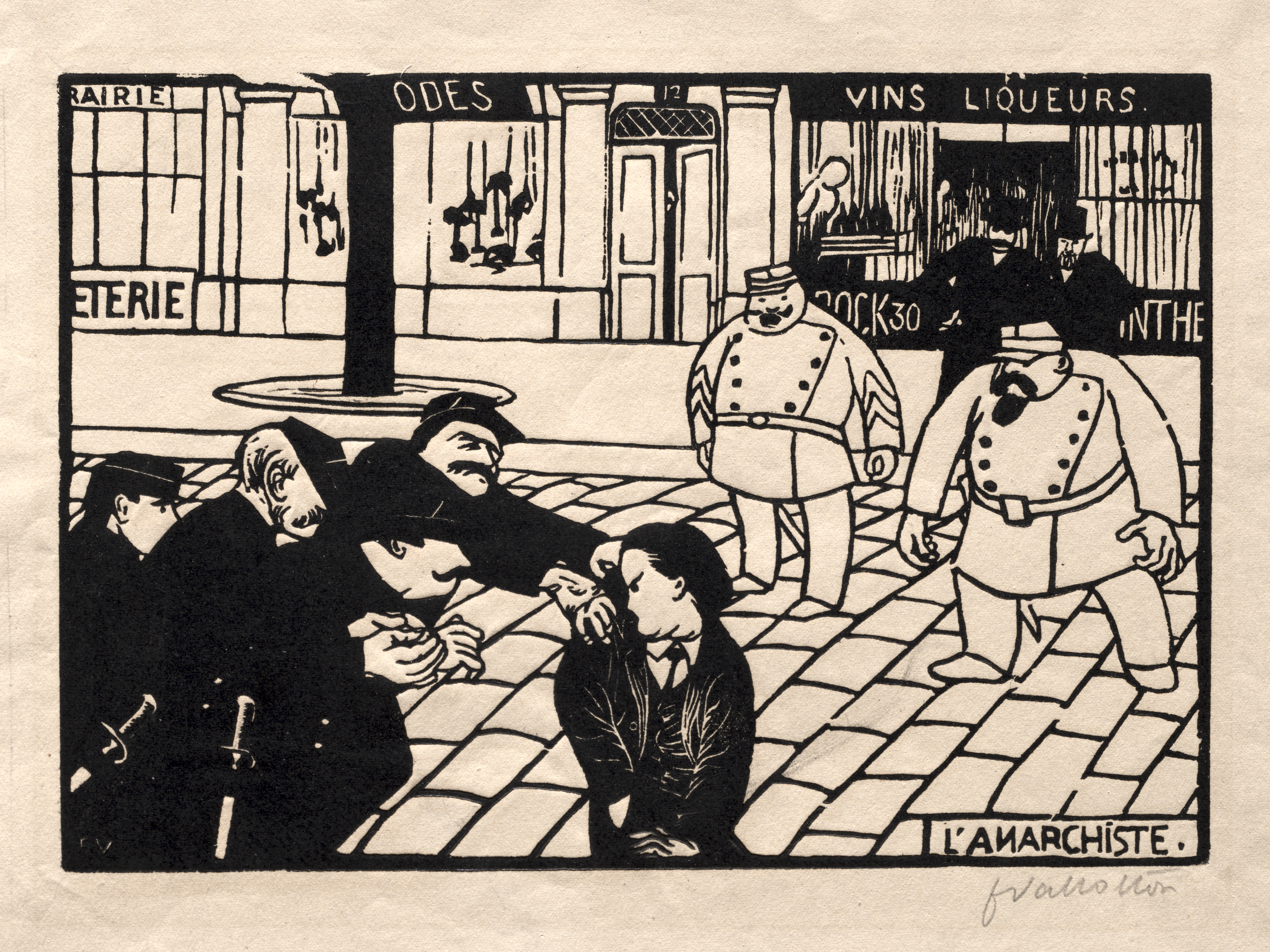
L'Anarchiste (1892) woodcut by Félix Vallotton

=== 19th-century realism ===
Visual art was considered one of the most important aspects of anarchist activity from the birth of anarchism, with Pierre-Joseph Proudhon writing on his friend and contemporary Gustave Courbet in the essay "Du Principe de l'art", published 1865, that "The task of art is to warn us, to praise us, to teach us, to make us blush by confronting us with the mirror of our own conscience." Courbet also went on to paint Proudhon on several occasions. Similarly Courbet himself wrote in 1850:

In our so very civilized society it is necessary for me to live the life of a savage. I must be free even of governments. The people have my sympathies, I must address myself to them directly.

=== Impressionism and Neo-Impressionism ===
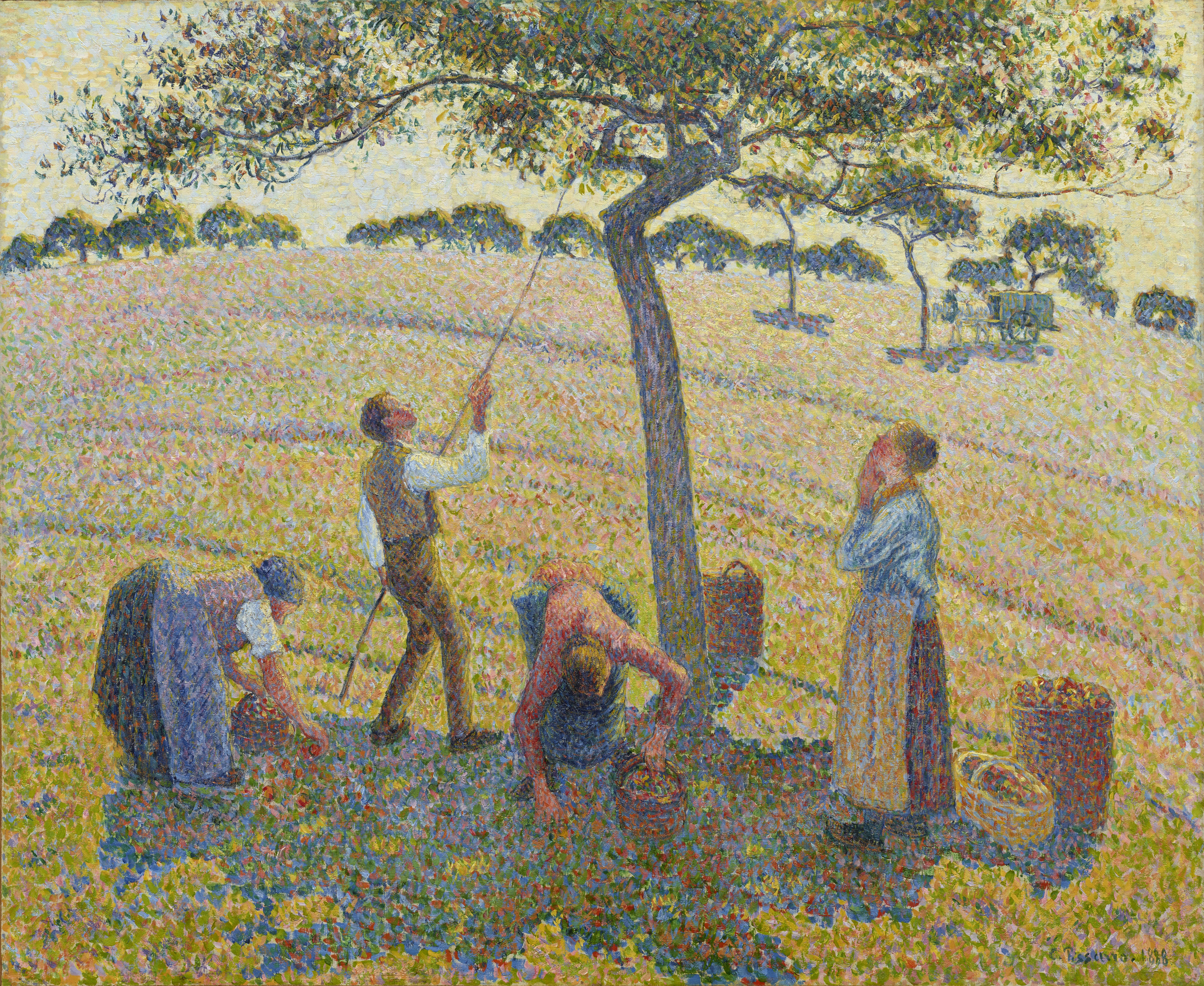
Les chataigniers a Osny (1888) by Impressionist painter Camille Pissarro

Among the Impressionists, the artist Camille Pissarro is known to have had strong anarchist sympathies which led him to recommend to his children that they change their surnames to avoid being associated with his political beliefs. Pissarro's anarchism brought him into contact with the younger artists who formed the Neo-Impressionist group, particularly Paul Signac, Henri-Edmond Cross, Charles Angrand, Théo van Rysselberghe and Maximillien Luce, who were active in anarchist circles, particularly those of the political activist Jean Grave, who encouraged other anarchist activists to embrace the potential of art to further their cause. In their collaborations they established a tripartite relationship between art and anarchism, still debated to this day, in which the artist could be employed for direct propagandistic purposes, or could show images of the true condition of the proletariat, or, more controversially, envision future realities towards which an anarchist revolution might aspire. It is in this latter context that the bucolic images of the south of France by artists such as Cross and Signac can be viewed as anarchist paintings.

=== Cubism and futurism ===
The Funeral of the Anarchist Galli by Carlo Carrà, 1911

Patricia Leighten has shown that Spanish cubist painter Juan Gris was an artist with strong anarchist sympathies, although she argues this is only evident in his overtly political cartoons. She suggests his cubist still lives deliberately eschewed anarchist subject matter so that he "self-consciously drained his paintings of political import, avoiding such anarchist subjects as prostitutes and neutralised his radical style." However, drawing on the principle established by Neo-Impressionist artists such as Cross and Signac, that anarchist art can also involve visualising alternative realities for an anarchist society, Michael Paraskos has criticised this reading of Gris's paintings, saying that this form of anarchism seems to demand that "artists conform to a predetermined template to define their work as radical. Cartoons of prostitutes are anarchist; paintings of bottles, playing cards and fruit are not."

Though typically not associated with futurism, anarchism had some minor influence on Futurism. Carlo Carrà's best known work was The Funeral of the Anarchist Galli, painted in 1911. In the 1912 catalogue for the Futurists' first Parisian exhibition, Umberto Boccioni remarked "the sheaves of lines corresponding to all the conflicting forces, following the general law of violence" which he labeled force lines encapsulating the Futurist idea of physical transcendentalism. Mark Antliff has suggested that this futurist aesthetic was "designed to involve the spectator in the very politics that led to Italy's intervention in World War I and, ultimately, to the rise of Fascism in Italy." The art historian Giovanni Lista has identified this aesthetic as first appearing in the anarcho-syndicalist current, where Marinetti encountered the Sorelian "myths of action and violence".

The individualist anarchist philosopher and poet Renzo Novatore belonged to the leftist section of futurism alongside other individualist anarcho-futurists such as Dante Carnesecchi, Leda Rafanelli, Auro d'Arcola, and Giovanni Governato.

=== Surrealism ===
An anarchist world…a surrealist world: they are the same.

— André Breton

Surrealism was both an artistic and political movement with aims at the liberation of the human being from the constraints of capitalism, the state, and the cultural forces that limit the reign of the imagination. From its origins individualist anarchists like Florent Fels opposed it with his magazine Action: Cahiers individualistes de philosophie et d'art. However faced with the popularity of surrealism Fels' magazine closed in 1922. The movement developed in France in the wake of World War I with André Breton (1896–1966) as its main theorist and poet. Originally it was tied closely to the Communist Party. Later, Breton, a close friend of Leon Trotsky, broke with the Communist Party and embraced anarchism, even writing in the publication of the French Anarchist Federation.

By the end of World War II the surrealist group led by Breton had decided to explicitly embrace anarchism. In 1952 Breton wrote "It was in the black mirror of anarchism that surrealism first recognised itself." "Breton was consistent in his support for the francophone Anarchist Federation and he continued to offer his solidarity after the Platformists around Fontenis transformed the FA into the Federation Communiste Libertaire. He was one of the few intellectuals who continued to offer his support to the FCL during the Algerian War (1954–1962) when the FCL suffered severe repression and was forced underground. He sheltered Fontenis whilst he was in hiding. He refused to take sides on the splits in the French anarchist movement and both he and Peret expressed solidarity as well with the new FA set up by the synthesist anarchists, and worked in the Antifascist Committees of the 1960s alongside the FA."

=== Post-war modernism ===
In the period after World War II the relationship between art and anarchism was articulated by a number of theorists including Alex Comfort, Herbert Read and George Woodcock. Although each wrote from perspectives supportive of modernist art they refused to accept the position put forward by Clement Greenberg that modernist art had no political, social or narrative meaning, a view that would have curtailed an anarchist reading of modern art. In his study on the relationship between modern art and radical politics, Social Radicalism and the Arts, Donald Drew Egbert argued that in fact, modern artists were often most at home with an anarchist understanding of the position of the place of the artist in society than either a de-politicised Greenbergian or a Marxist understanding of the role of art.

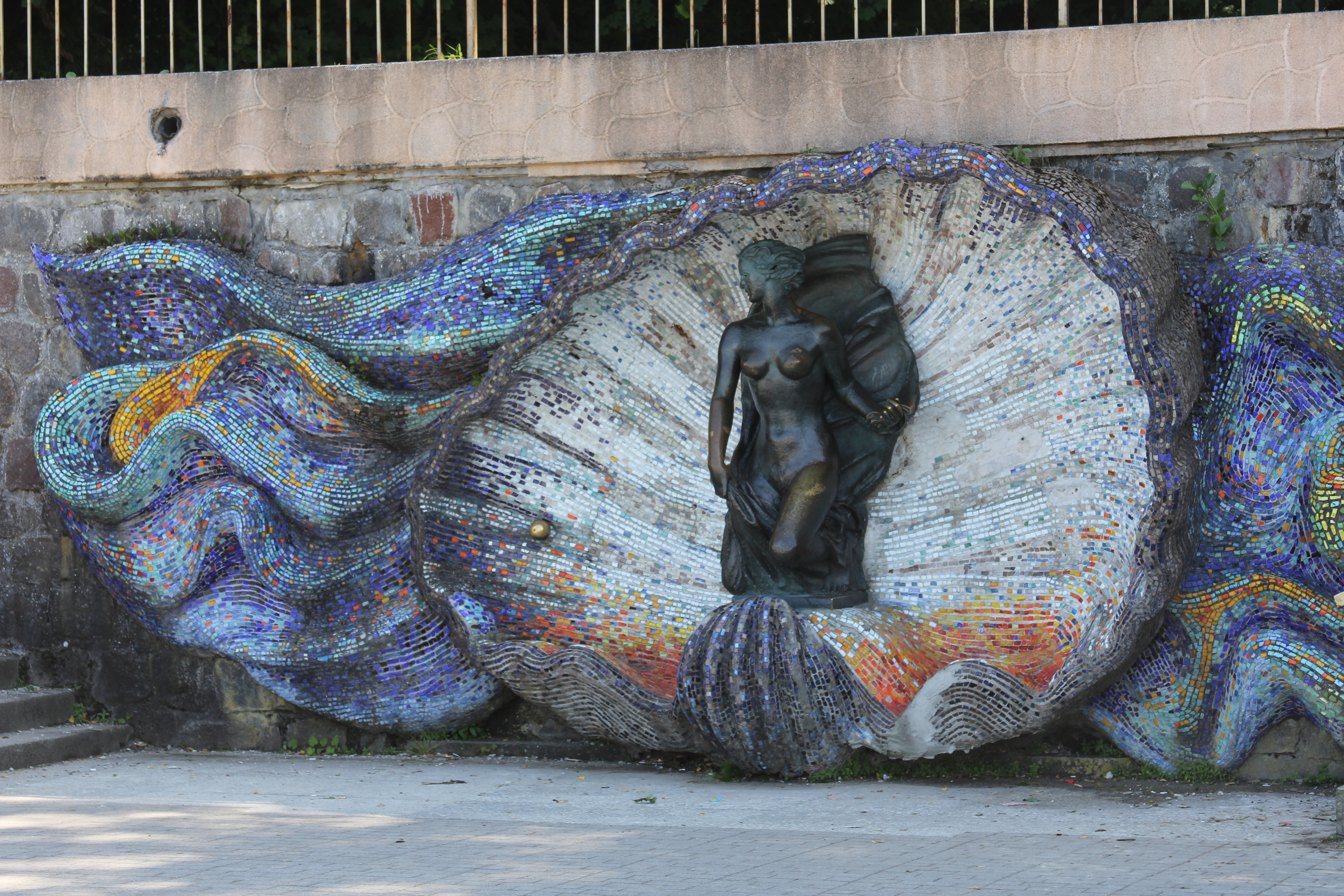
Anarchist statue and mural

=== Contemporary art ===
In contemporary art anarchism can take diverse forms, from carnivalesque street art, to graffiti art and graphic novels, to various traditional forms of art, including painting, sculpture, video and photography.

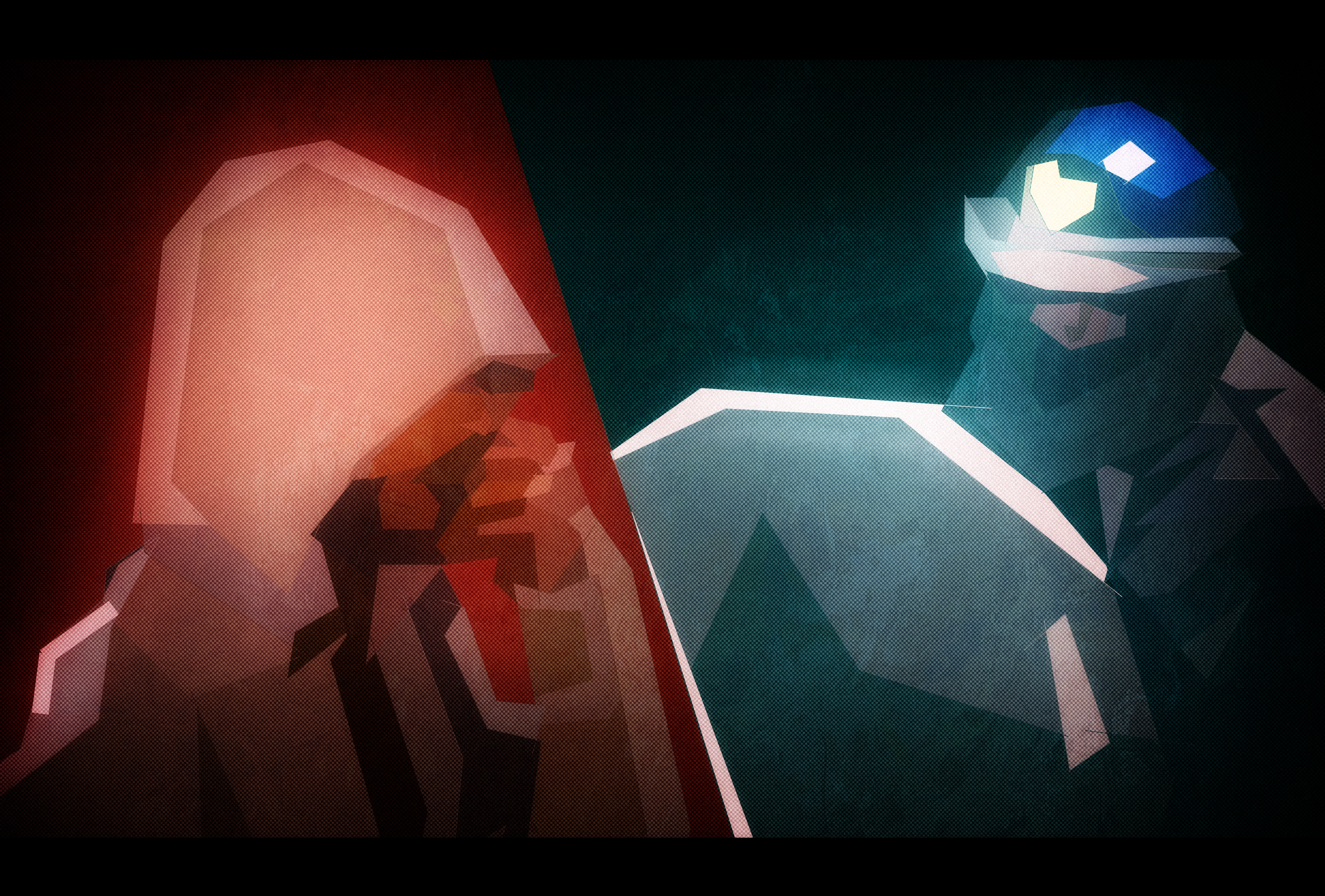
Cubist anarchist art, depicting the Tottenham protests

== Music ==
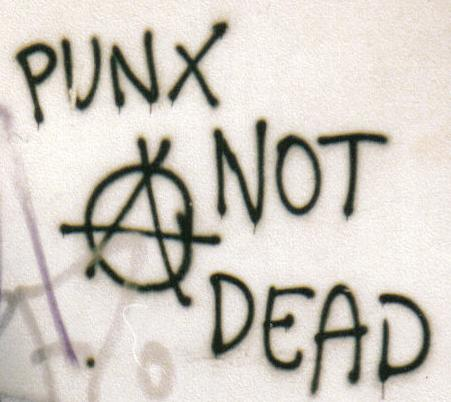
Punx [Punk's] Not Dead graffiti

A number of performers and artists have either been inspired by anarchist concepts, or have used the medium of music and sound in order to promote anarchist ideas and politics. French singers-songwriters Léo Ferré and Georges Brassens are maybe the first to do so, in the fifties and beyond.

Punk rock is one movement that has taken much inspiration from the often potent imagery and symbolism associated with anarchism and Situationist rhetoric, if not always the political theory. In the past few decades, anarchism has been closely associated with the punk rock movement, and has grown because of that association (whatever other effects that has had on the movement and the prejudiced pictures of it). Indeed, many anarchists were introduced to the ideas of Anarchism through that symbolism and the anti-authoritarian sentiment which many punk songs expressed.

Anarcho-punk, on the other hand, is a current that has been more explicitly engaged with anarchist politics, particularly in the case of bands such as Crass, Poison Girls, (early) Chumbawamba, The Ex, Dead End, Flux of Pink Indians, Rudimentary Peni, The Apostles, Riot/Clone, Conflict, Oi Polloi, Sin Dios, Propagandhi, Citizen Fish, Bus Station Loonies etc. Many other bands, especially at the local level of unsigned groups, have taken on what is known as a "punk" or "DIY" ethic: that is, Do It Yourself, indeed a popular Anarcho-punk slogan reads "DIY not EMI", a reference to a conscious rejection of the major record company. Some groups who began as 'anarcho-punk' have attempted to move their ideas into a more mainstream musical arena, for instance, Chumbawamba, who continue to support and promote anarchist politics despite now playing more dance music and pop influenced styles. The Folk Punk genre, also called "radical folk", also heavily explores anarchist ideas in an inherently DIY fashion and has become increasingly prevalent in protest culture, with artists like Johnny Hobo and the Freight Trains openly asserting anarchist beliefs. Pat the Bunny, Ramshackle Glory, The Taxpayers, Mischief Brew, Blackbird Raum, and Days N Daze are examples of thematically anarchist folk punk bands.

Techno music is also connected strongly to anarchists and eco-anarchists, as many of the events playing these types of music are self-organised and put on in contravention of national laws. Sometimes doors are pulled off empty warehouses and the insides transformed into illegal clubs with cheap (or free) entrance, types of music not heard elsewhere and quite often an abundance of different drugs. Other raves may be held outside, and are viewed negatively by the authorities. In the UK, the Criminal Justice Bill (1994) outlawed these events (raves) and brought together a coalition of socialists, ravers and direct actionists who opposed the introduction of this 'draconian' Act of Parliament by having a huge 'party&protest' in the Centre of London that descended into one of the largest riots of the 1990s in Britain. Digital hardcore, an electronic music genre, is also overtly anarchist; Atari Teenage Riot is the most widely recognized digital hardcore band. Both Digital Hardcore, Techno and related genres are not the sole preserve of anarchists; people of many musical, political or recreational persuasions are involved in these musical scenes.

Heavy metal bands such as Sweden's Arch Enemy and Germany's Kreator have also embraced anarchistic themes in their lyrics and imagery. A substantial subgenre of "Red & Anarchist" black metal embraces anarchist politics.

In experimental music, Negativland's The ABCs of Anarchism includes a reading of material from Alexander Berkman's Now and After and other anarchist-related material in a sound collage. Experimental composer John Cage explicitly embraced anarchism, including in his 1988 book Anarchy.

Paul Gailiunas and his late wife Helen Hill co-wrote the anarchist song "Emma Goldman", which was performed by the band Piggy: The Calypso Orchestra of the Maritimes and released on their 1999 album Don't Stop the Calypso: Songs of Love and Liberation. After Helen and Paul moved to New Orleans, Paul started a new band called The Troublemakers and re-released the song "Emma Goldman" on their 2004 album Here Come The Troublemakers. Proclaiming the motto "It's your duty as a citizen to troublemake," other songs on the album include "International Flag Burning Day."

The Charter of the Forest, which invented the genre of "Read-Opera," is a combination poetic-musical work which espouses anarchist ideas of opposition to hierarchy, as well as being highly influenced by a Tolstoyan commitment to nonviolence.

== See also ==
- Anarchist symbolism
- Anti-art
- Artivist
- List of fictional anarchists
