= Secret Annex =

Secret Annex may mean:

- Secret Annex of the Anne Frank House
  - Tales from the Secret Annex, a collection writing Anne Frank published in 1949
- Act of Seclusion, required by a secret annex to the Treaty of Westminster (1654)

== See also ==
- Secret treaty
- Entente Cordiale, with a secret annex
- Molotov–Ribbentrop Pact, with a secret annex
- Treaty of Brest-Litovsk, with secret clauses
