= Circle-A =

Symbol of anarchism

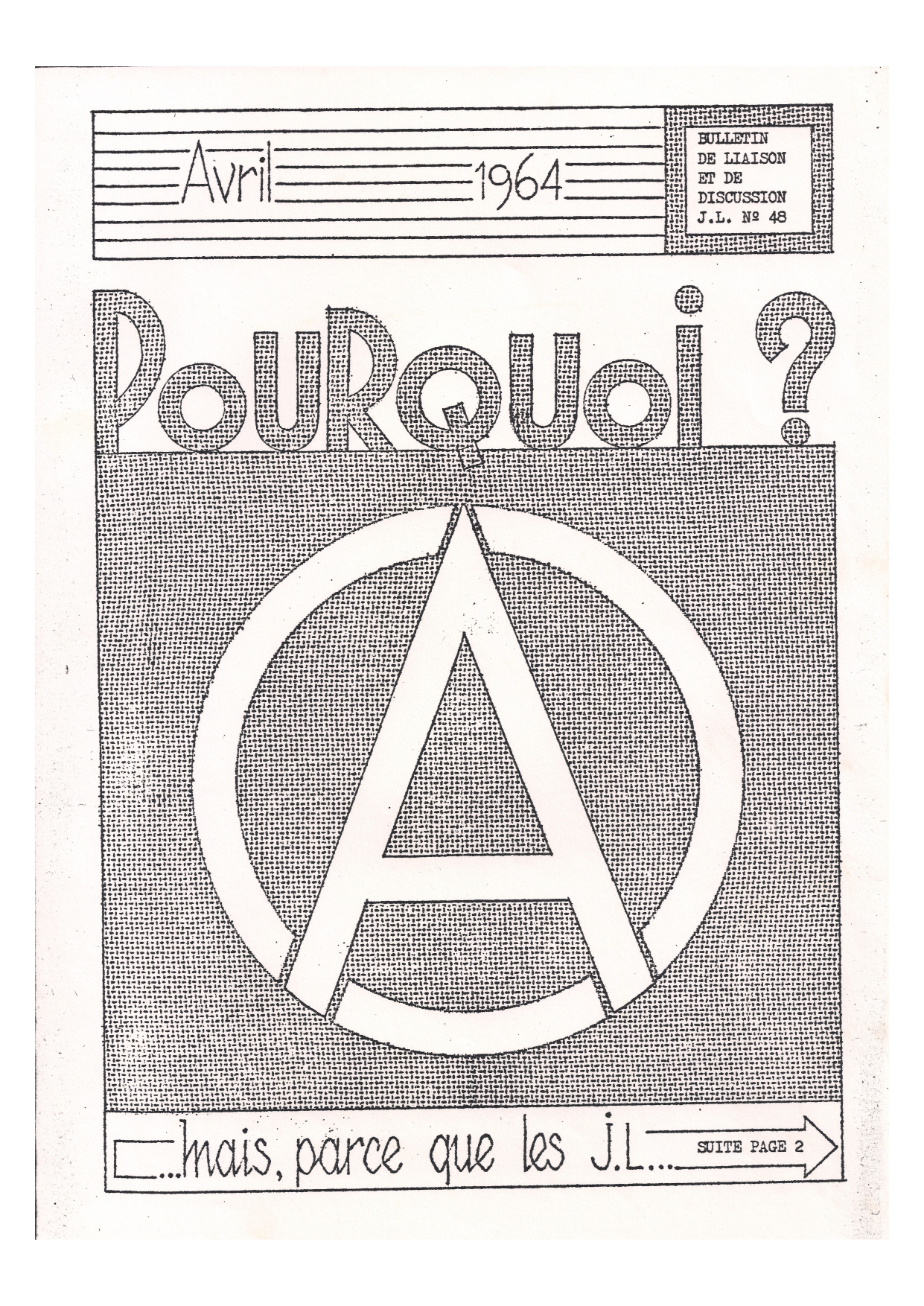
- First circle-A of history in the Bulletin des Jeunesses Libertaires
- Artists: Tomás Ibáñez; René Darras
- Year: April 1964
- Movement: Anarchism

The circle-A or anarchist A, written as Ⓐ, is a graphic and political symbol representing the anarchist movement and ideology. Seeking a symbol that could easily represent the entire movement, it was conceptualized in April 1964 by the Libertarian Youth group of Paris. It was made on the initiative of Tomás Ibáñez, and was graphically represented by René Darras. The symbol initially remained limited to France for a few years before spreading to Italy, especially to Milan, in 1968. Starting in the early 1970s, the circle-A spread across Italy, France, and then throughout the world.

Its simplicity to draw, its unifying nature, and its synthetic appearance led it to become a central symbol of anarchism in a relatively short period of time. Notably, it was not promoted by any single organization but was autonomously adopted by the anarchist movement, since it was well-suited for purposes of political propaganda and rallying.

The circle-A is partly responsible for the generational renewal that affected the anarchist movement between the last years of the 20th century and the first half of the 21st century, allowing a movement that was losing momentum to rejuvenate itself by finding a new, unifying, and recognizable symbol. Since its creation, it has been derived into numerous forms.

One of the most famous of these evolutions is the "punk" version, where the lines of the A extend beyond the circle. The circle-A is now present in a significant part of the world and acts as a unifying sign among anarchists from many different places.

== History ==
=== Premises ===
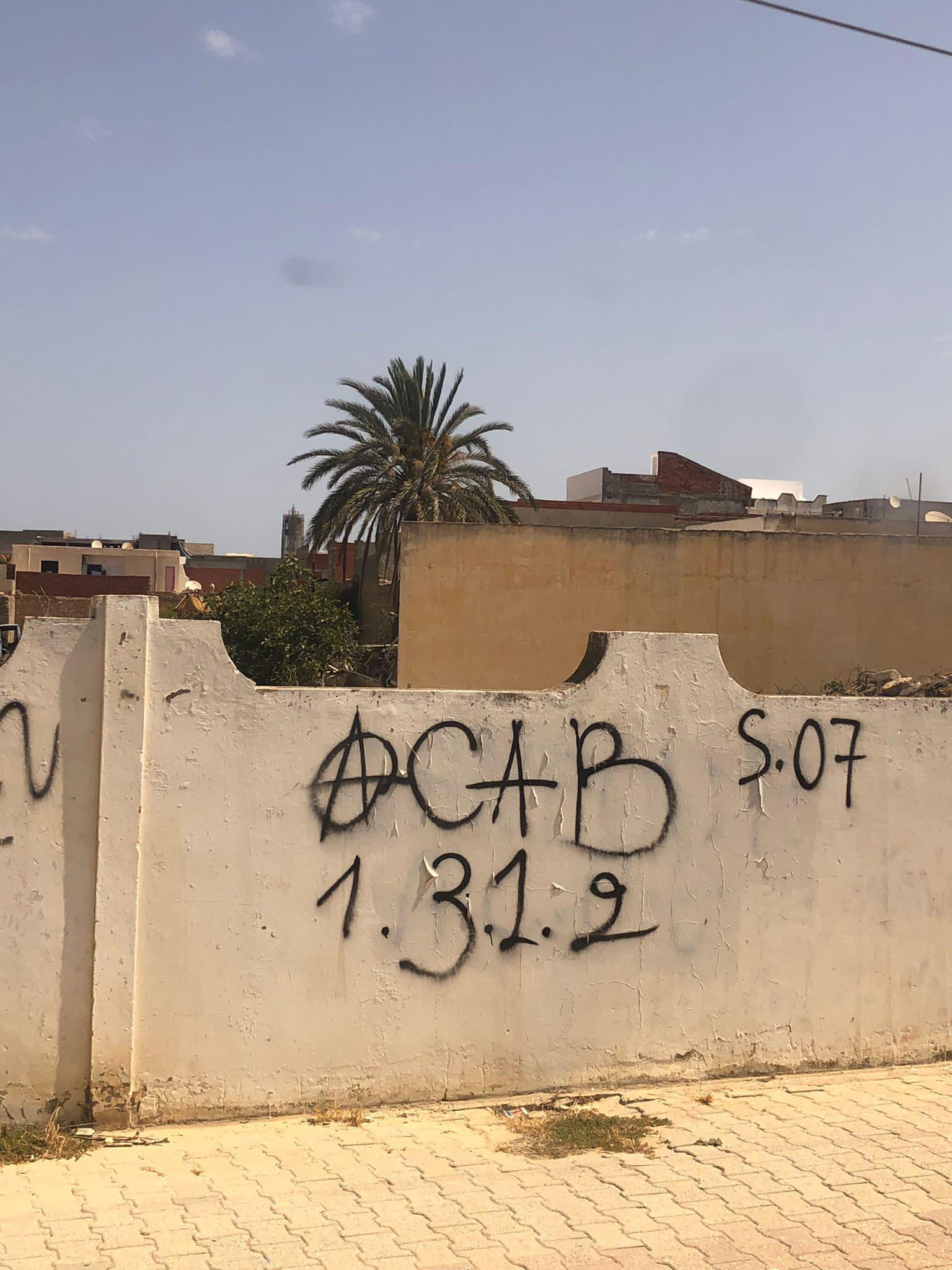
Circle-A in a 'punk' format with ACAB in Sousse, Tunisia (2023)

In the 19th century, the development of capitalism saw the formation of several opposing political ideologies and movements, including anarchism. Anarchists advocate for the struggle against all forms of domination perceived as unjust, among which is economic domination, with the development of capitalism. They are particularly opposed to the State, viewed as the institution enabling the endorsement of many of these dominations through its police, army, and propaganda.

Anarchists initially reused symbols from the republican and socialist traditions, such as the red flag, but separated themselves from these starting in the early 1880s, notably with the demonstration of 9 March 1883, where Louise Michel flew the black flag and made it a central and traditional symbol of the movement. The black flag was then derived in different forms, for example in the flag of the CNT, which is red and black, giving a red and black flag for anarcho-syndicalism.

However, while these symbols exist, none are easy to display or propagate, and unlike the Marxists, who had the hammer and sickle, anarchists were then devoid of a symbol quick to draw that would unite them all in the same gesture and the same sign.

In the 1960s, a vast movement of protest was felt among the youth against the aging institutions and values of Gaullist France and, more broadly, the Western world. This youth notably began writing extensively on walls and using graffiti to convey their ideas. They therefore needed a simple, all-encompassing anarchist rallying sign.

=== Jeunesses Libertaires and the creation of the first circle-A ===
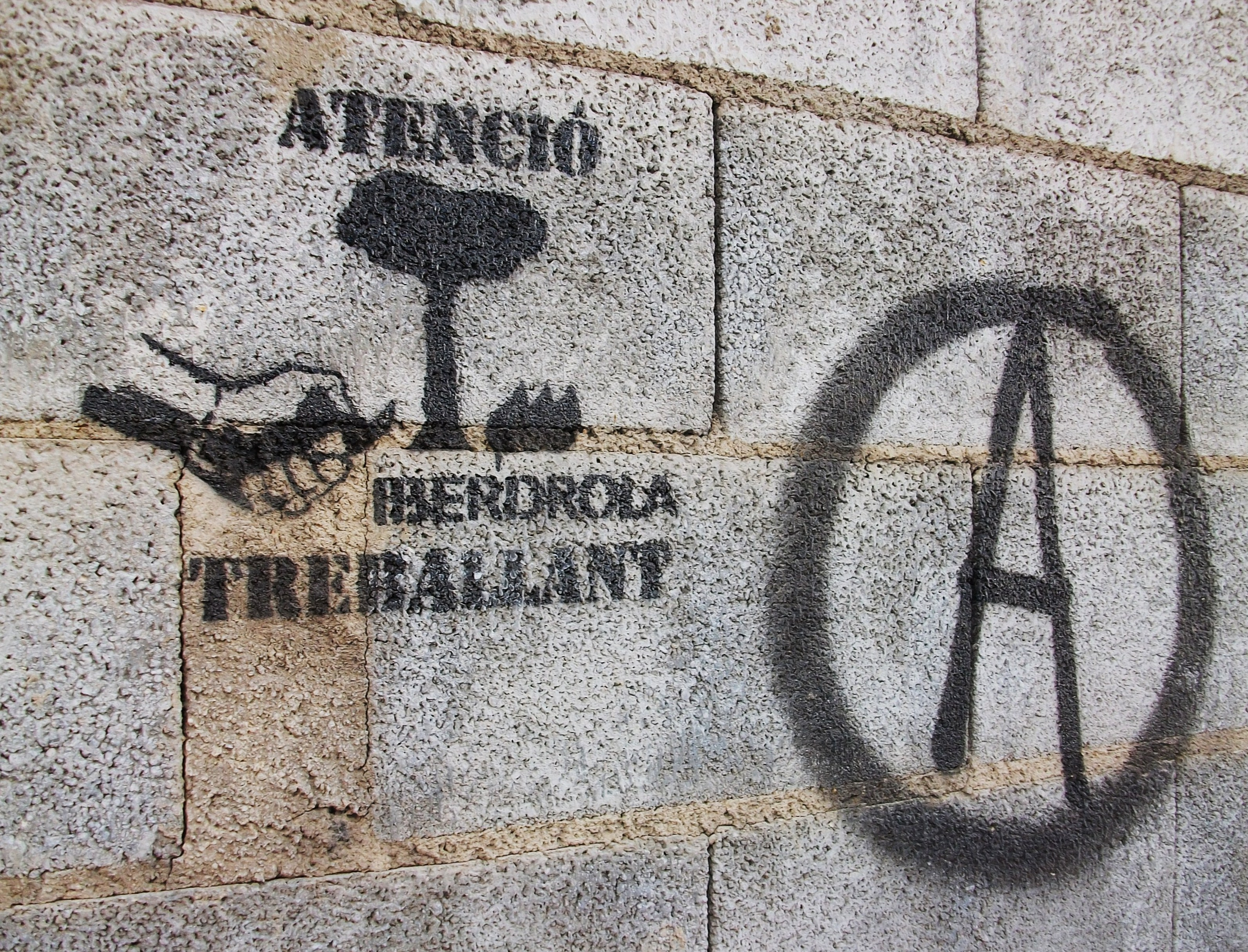
Circle-A in the region of Valencia, Spain (2013)

In 1963, Tomás Ibáñez, a nineteen-year-old Spanish anarchist well-integrated into the anarchist fabric in France, who participated in the founding of a Libertarian Youth group in Marseille and associated with other notable anarchists of that period like Hellyette Bess and René Bianco, moved to Paris to study at the Sorbonne.

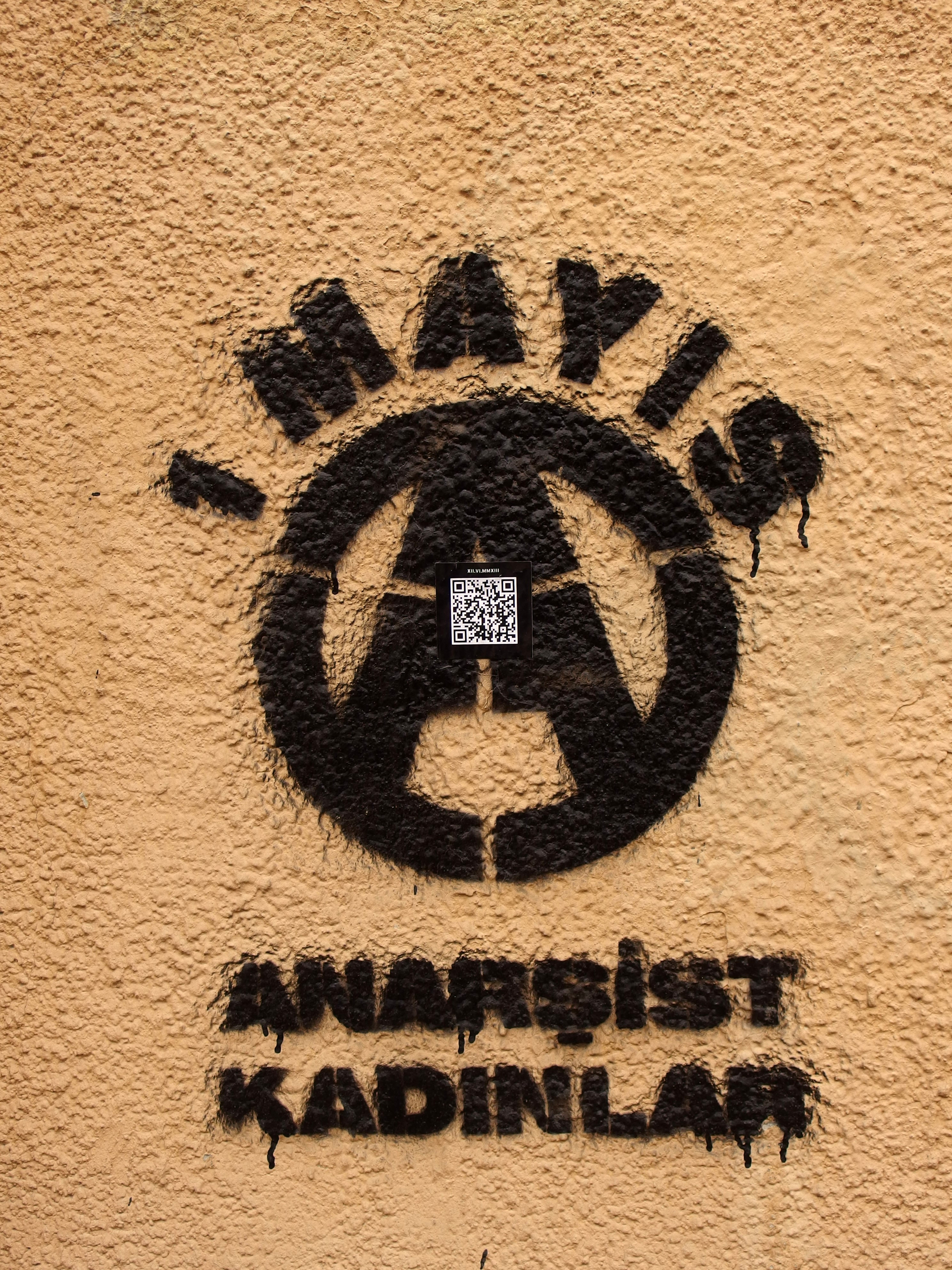
Circle-A in Istanbul, Turkey (2013)

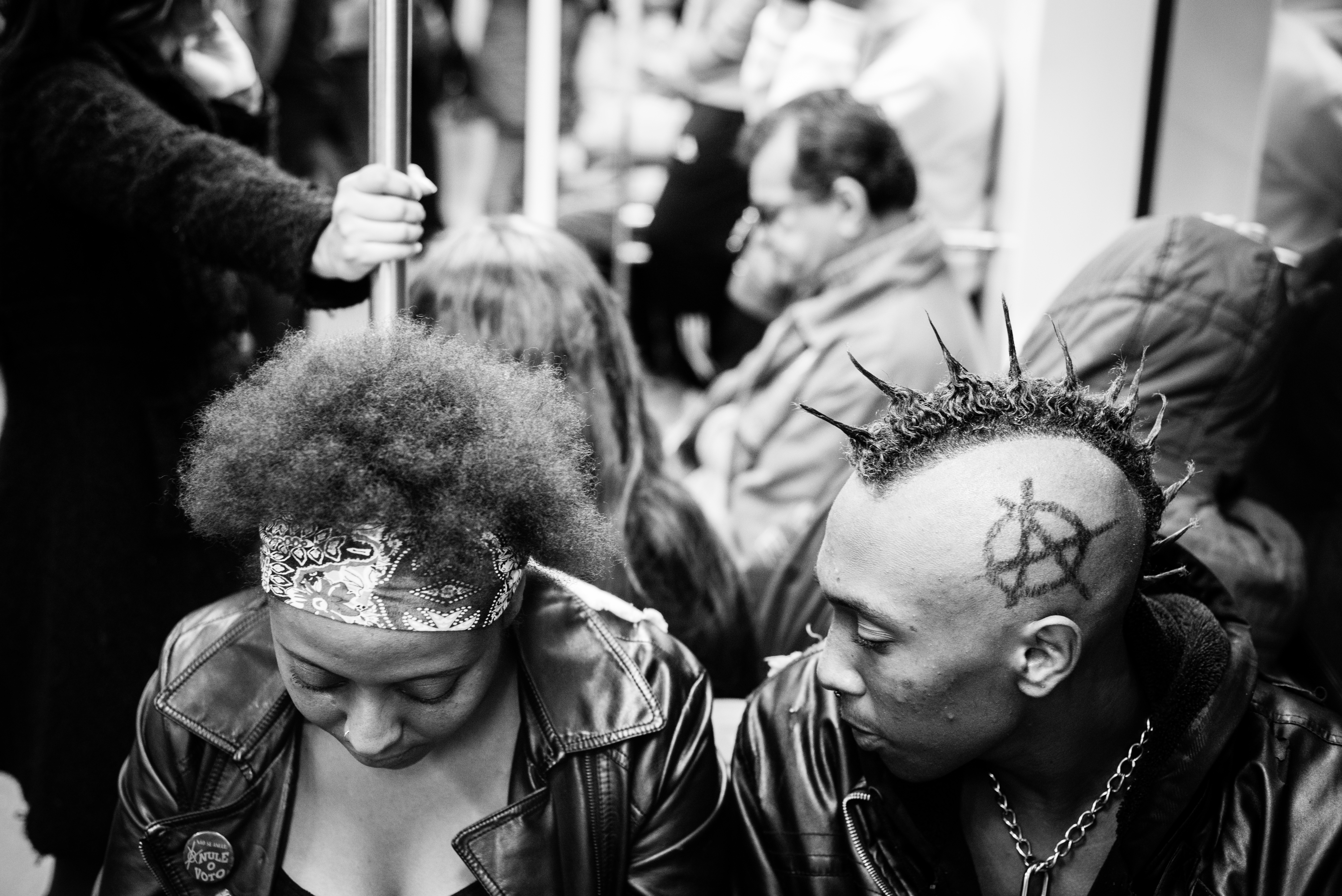
Circle-A in a 'punk' format tattooed on the head of a punk in São Paulo, Brazil (2015)

He became involved in anarchist initiatives in both Spain and France, and in 1964, with the Libertarian Youth group of Paris, he published an issue of the Bulletin des Jeunesses Libertaires in April 1964. This issue presented the symbol that Darras was responsible for drawing, proposing it to anarchists and libertarians worldwide for adoption. Ibáñez wrote the following explanatory text in the same issue to describe the invention of the symbol and the reasons why their group undertook this initiative:

Two main motivations guided us: first, to facilitate and make the practical activities of inscriptions and postings more efficient, and second, to ensure a broader presence of the anarchist movement in the public eye, through a common characteristic for all expressions of anarchism in its public manifestations. More precisely, for us it was a matter of finding a practical way to minimize the inscription time by avoiding having to put too long a signature under our slogans, and on the other hand, to choose a sign general enough to be adopted and used by all anarchists. The adopted sign seemed to us to best meet these criteria. By constantly associating it with the word 'anarchist', it will eventually, through a well-known mental automatism, evoke the idea of anarchism all by itself in people's minds.

In December of the same year, Ibáñez reused the circle-A once again, this time placing it in the title of an article he wrote for the newspaper Action libertaire.

Despite this invention and the beginning of its use, the symbol was not initially well known, being sporadically shared within anarchist circles in France.

=== Spread to the anarchist movement in Italy and then worldwide ===
In 1966, two years later, the symbol began to be adopted on an "experimental basis" according to historians Marianne Enckell and Amedeo Bertolo. In 1968, the Libertarian Youth of Milan—which had significant links with Parisian anarchists—used it regularly and spread it throughout Lombardy and Italy.

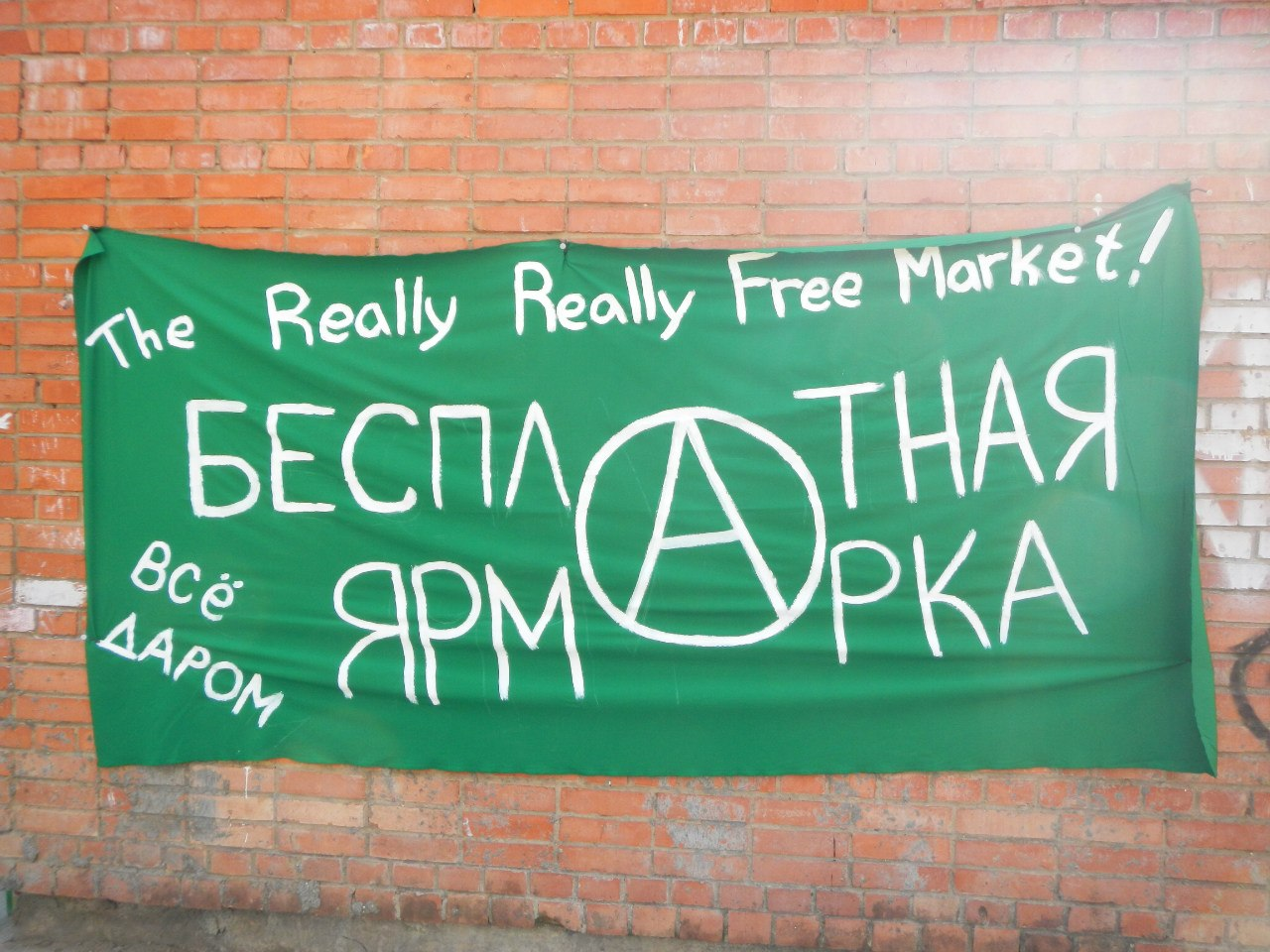
Roll-up in Ivanovo, Russia (2012)

The circle-A spread across the country, and subsequently, starting from Italy, it began to propagate worldwide.

=== The circle-A as a central symbol of the anarchist movement ===
The circle-A subsequently became, and especially starting from the years 1972-1973, an international anarchist sign that transcended borders and spread throughout the world.

This is partly due to the fact that it is particularly simple to use and draw, but also because the A unites all anarchists under a common and shared designation—Bertolo, Enckell, and Normand Baillargeon also note that it spread across the world through an autonomous surge without being imposed by any organization.

In reality, during the 20th century, anarchism gradually lost importance compared to other ideologies like communism, which was supported by the significant political and financial means of the USSR or China. Anarchism was increasingly seen as a movement of aging militants losing dynamism—the circle-A is one of the points that allowed for significant generational renewal between the last decades of that century and the first of the 21st century, seeing the movement reborn and reconstituted as a major force of the far-left. Another element allowing for a renewal of militants was the black bloc strategy.

== Meanings and variations of the symbol ==
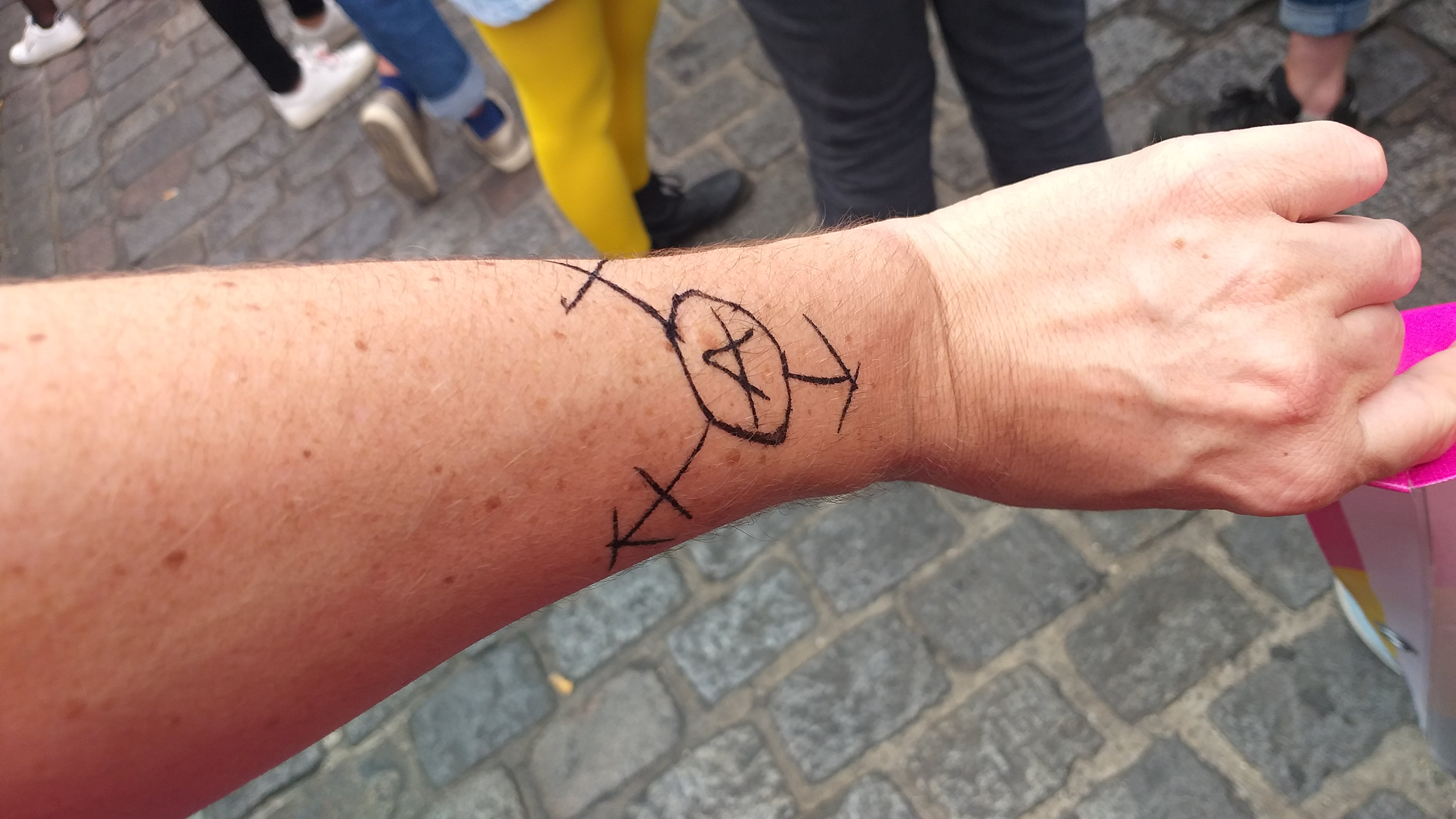
Anarchist wearing the circle-A inscribed in the transgender symbol, one of the symbols of queer anarchism (2020)

In addition to being a rallying sign that is simple to draw and affects many cultures and peoples, the symbol has several variations, one of the most notable being its 'punk' version, where the lines of the central A extend beyond the edges.

This version is completely accepted by Ibáñez, who uses it as an example of the fact that this symbol would not be—contrary to received ideas in some anarchist circles—the Proudhonian idea of anarchy contained within the circle, which would be synonymous with order. On the contrary, according to him, this idea was not discussed at all during the sign's elaboration, and he uses the 'punk' forms to show how the evolution of this symbol into other forms demonstrates that it does not signify this Proudhonian idea of anarchy contained within order.

The American anarchist historian Cindy Milstein considers it a symbol representing the two fundamental ideas of anarchism: the abolition of all forms of domination and hierarchical social organization, and their replacement by egalitarian, horizontal forms of life and organization.

== Bibliography ==
- Berthier, René (2015), La fin de la première Internationale [The end of the First Internationale] (in French), Paris: Le Monde Libertaire, ISBN 978-2915514636
- Jourdain, Edouard (2013). L'anarchisme [Anarchism]. Paris: La Découverte. ISBN 978-2-7071-9091-8.
- Ward, Colin (2004). Anarchism: A Very Short Introduction. Oxford University Press (OUP).
