= Anarchist symbolism =

Typical symbols expressing anarchist ideology

Anarchists have employed certain symbols for their cause since the 19th century, including most prominently the circle-A, the black flag or the black cat. Bisected flags, often using the black flag as a basis, are also frequent for various anarchist tendencies, such as the red and black or black and purple flags, respectively for anarcho-syndicalism and anarcha-feminism.

Since the latter half of the 20th century, the movement has been rejuvenated by the use of new symbols, easier to draw and more recognizable, the most famous of them being the circle-A.

Anarchist cultural symbols have become more prevalent in popular culture since around the turn of the 21st century, concurrent with the anti-globalization movement and with the punk subculture.

== Flags ==
=== Red flag ===
The red flag, one of the first anarchist symbols

The red flag was one of the first anarchist symbols; it was widely used in late 19th century by anarchists worldwide. Peter Kropotkin wrote that he preferred the use of the red flag. French anarchist Louise Michel wrote that the flag "frightens the executioners because it is so red with our blood. [...] Those red and black banners wave over us mourning our dead and wave over our hopes for the dawn that is breaking."

Use of the red flag by anarchists largely disappeared after the October Revolution, when red flags started to be associated only with Bolshevism and communist parties and authoritarian, bureaucratic and reformist social democracy, or authoritarian socialism.

=== Black flag ===
The black flag, a traditional anarchist symbol

The origins of the black flag as an anarchist symbol are uncertain. In any case, by the early 1880, Black was already an anarchist color; for example, Black International was the name of a London-based British anarchist group founded in July 1881, and the Mano Negra ('Black Hand'), an alleged anarchist organization in Spain, was strongly associated with anarchism.

For the black flag specifically, it was flown in the 1831 Canut revolt, in which black represented the mourning of liberty lost for those Lyonnese silk workers - although they weren't anarchist. The question of the black flag was debated in 1881 in Lyon's circles, when the anarchist Claude Bernard opposed the removal of the black flag during a meeting. He declared that keeping this flag was necessary to honour the Canut revolt, the Lyon revolts of 1848, and the Lyon Commune (1871).

The following year, the Black Band, a group or groups of insurrectionary anarchist miners connected to the anarchists of Lyon, published communiqués in the Lyonnese anarchist L'Étendard révolutionnaire ('The Revolutionary Standard') where they retook the black flag as a symbol - on the first such occurrence, they said :

'The 'Black Band' is the 'Band of Misery', the black flag we have raised is the flag of hunger, of strike, of all-out struggle on the ground of the social revolution, of the annihilation of capital, of employers, of the exploitation of man by man'.

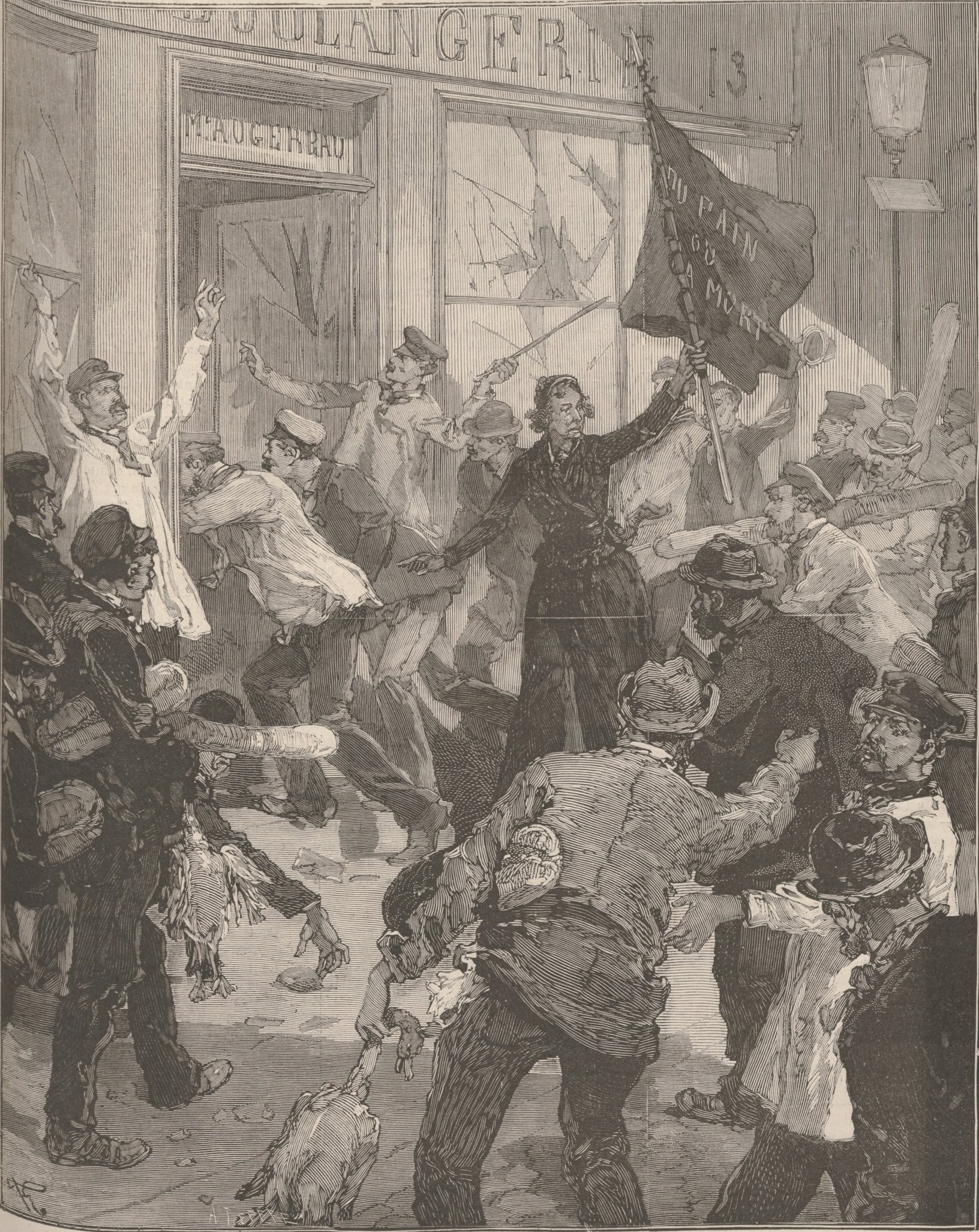
Front page of Le Monde illustré depicting Louise Michel carrying the black flag and inciting demonstrators to loot a bakery during the demonstration of 9 March 1883. Her flag has the inscription 'Bread or Death' but it's not certain that something was written on it during the event.

However, this association of a specific black flag with anarchism did not occur on a big scale until the demonstration of 9 March 1883. During this demonstration, Louise Michel, a figure of anarchism - who was in Lyon in early 1883 while Kropotkin and 65 other anarchists were targeted for their alleged support to the Black Band activities, and who was herself always dressed in black, carried a black flag made from a rag and a broom, against hunger and poverty.

This use of the black flag by Michel made it 'enter history', according to the historian Félix Chartreux. From this demonstration and Michel's action onwards, it began to be reused. Michel gave the following meanings to her use of the black flag during her trial, before being sentenced to six years in prison:

Ah certainly, Mr. Attorney General, you find it strange that a woman dares to defend the black flag. Why did we shelter the demonstration under the black flag? Because this flag is the flag of strikes and it indicates that the worker has no bread. [...] The people are dying of hunger, and they do not even have the right to say that they are dying of hunger. Well, I took the black flag and went to say that the people were without work and without bread. That is my crime; judge it as you will.

After this, the black flag started to be gradually associated with anarchism, when several anarchist organizations and journals adopted the name Black Flag and retook this legacy. Anarchism has a shared tradition with—among other ideologies—socialism, a movement strongly associated with the red flag. As anarchism became more and more distinct from socialism in the 1880s, the black flag was also a good way to differentiate itself.

The French anarchist paper Le Drapeau Noir (The Black Flag), which printed its first issue in August 1883, shortly after Michel's trial for the protest, is one of the first published references to use the black flag in its name. The black flag soon made its way to the United States. The black flag was displayed in Chicago at an anarchist demonstration in November 1884. According to the English-language newspaper of the Chicago anarchists, it was "the fearful symbol of hunger, misery and death". Thousands of anarchists attended Kropotkin's 1921 funeral behind the black flag.

The black flag has since been reinterpreted by various anarchists as signifying other meanings in addition to those noted by Michel; the researcher and anarchist Howard J. Ehrlich, for example, wrote in 1996 that:

The black flag is the negation of all flags. It is a negation of nationhood ... Black is a mood of anger and outrage at all the hideous crimes against humanity perpetrated in the name of allegiance to one state or another ... But black is also beautiful. It is a colour of determination, of resolve, of strength, a colour by which all others are clarified and defined ... So black is negation, is anger, is outrage, is mourning, is beauty, is hope, is the fostering and sheltering of new forms of human life and relationship on and with this earth.

=== Bisected flag ===
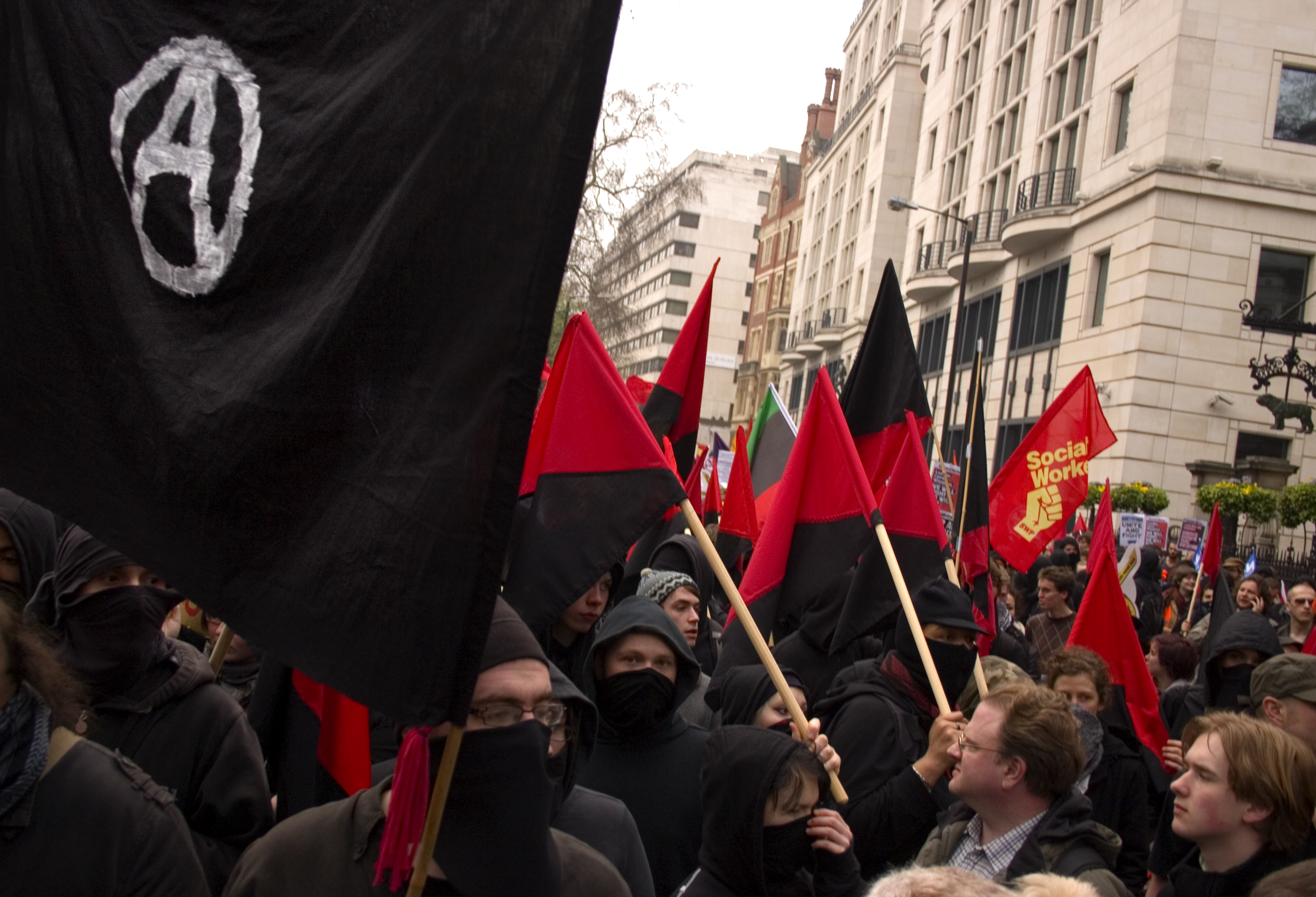
Black and red-and-black bisected flags at an anti-austerity march in London, 2011

The colors black and red have been used by anarchists since at least the late 1800s when they were used on cockades by Italian anarchists in the 1874 Bologna insurrection and in 1877 when anarchists entered the Italian town of Letino carrying red and black flags to promote the First International.

Diagonally divided red and black flags were used by anarcho-syndicalists in Spain such as the labor union CNT during the Spanish Civil War.

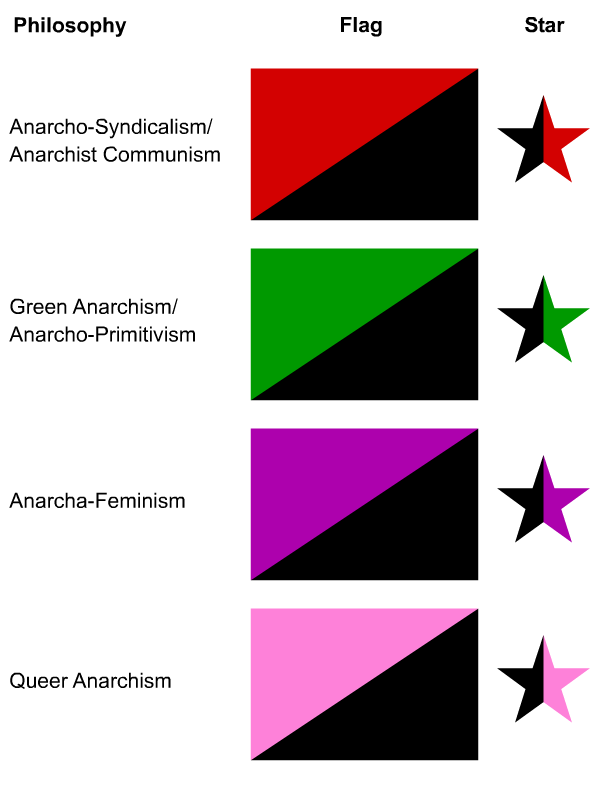
Various bisected flags used to represent different anarchist tendencies

Other tendencies within anarchism, such as anarcha-feminism, reused this split design by choosing colours other than red, symbols that have appeared at least since the early 2000s.

== Symbols ==
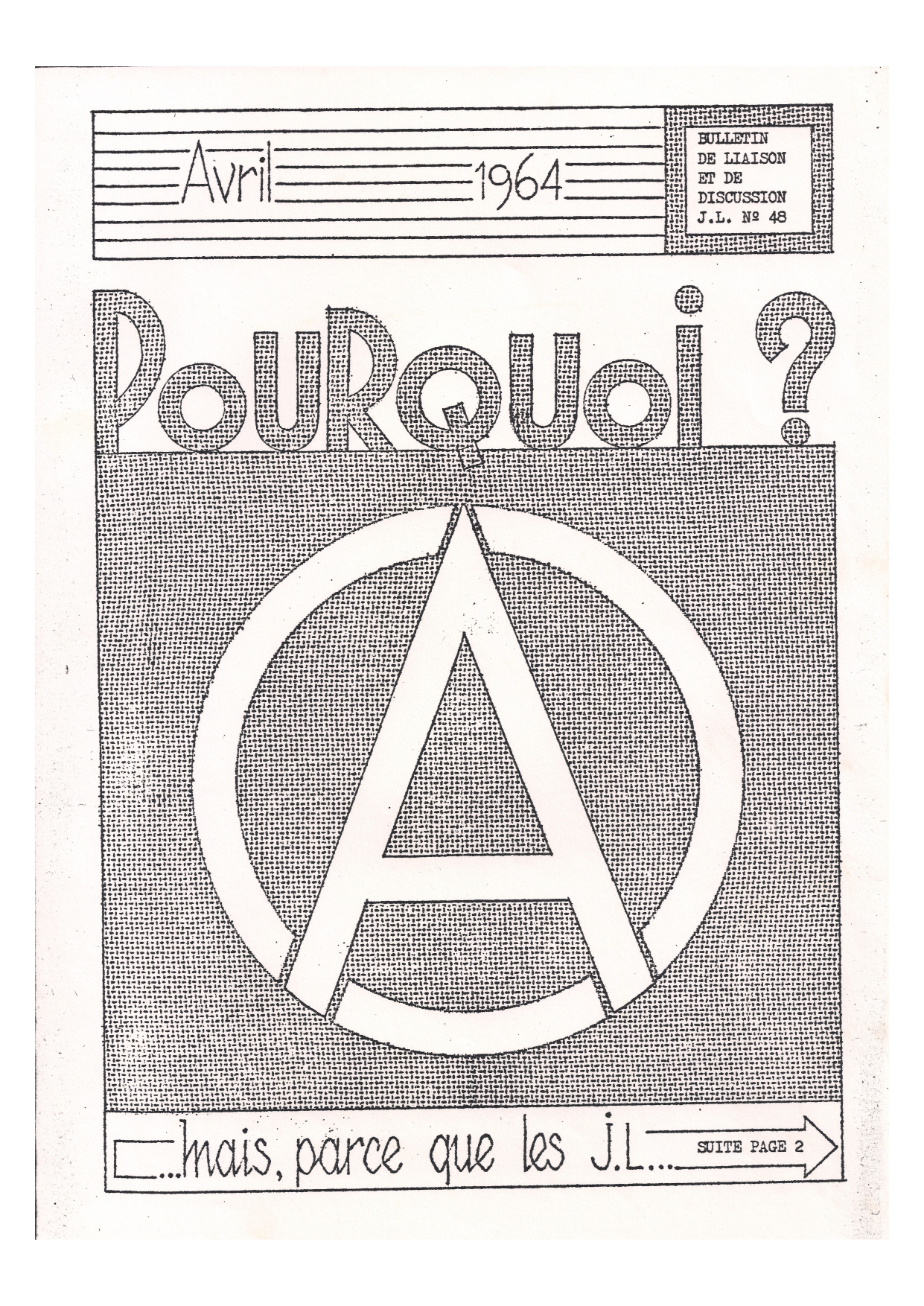
First circle-A of history in the Bulletin des Jeunesses Libertaires

=== Circle-A ===
Circle-A symbol

Stylized punk Circle-A

The symbol composed of the capital letter A surrounded by a circle is universally recognized as a symbol of anarchism. The circled A first appeared in Western Europe in the early 1960s. The anarchists from the Paris Libertarian Youth group, including Tomás Ibáñez, a nineteen-year-old Spanish anarchist, and René Darras, one of his companions, sought to create a symbol that would meet the needs they faced. They were looking for a symbol that could unite all anarchists in a single, unifying, and easy-to-draw emblem. This effort was also motivated by the fact that communists had the easily drawn hammer and sickle, while anarchists at the time lacked a similar symbol that was simple to tag, for example. When their group unveiled the first circled A and proposed its adoption, Ibáñez wrote:

Two main motivations guided us: first, to facilitate and make the practical activities of inscriptions and postings more efficient, and second, to ensure a broader presence of the anarchist movement in the public eye, through a common characteristic for all expressions of anarchism in its public manifestations. More precisely, for us it was a matter of finding a practical way to minimize the inscription time by avoiding having to put too long a signature under our slogans, and on the other hand, to choose a sign general enough to be adopted and used by all anarchists. The adopted sign seemed to us to best meet these criteria. By constantly associating it with the word 'anarchist', it will eventually, through a well-known mental automatism, evoke the idea of anarchism all by itself in people's minds.

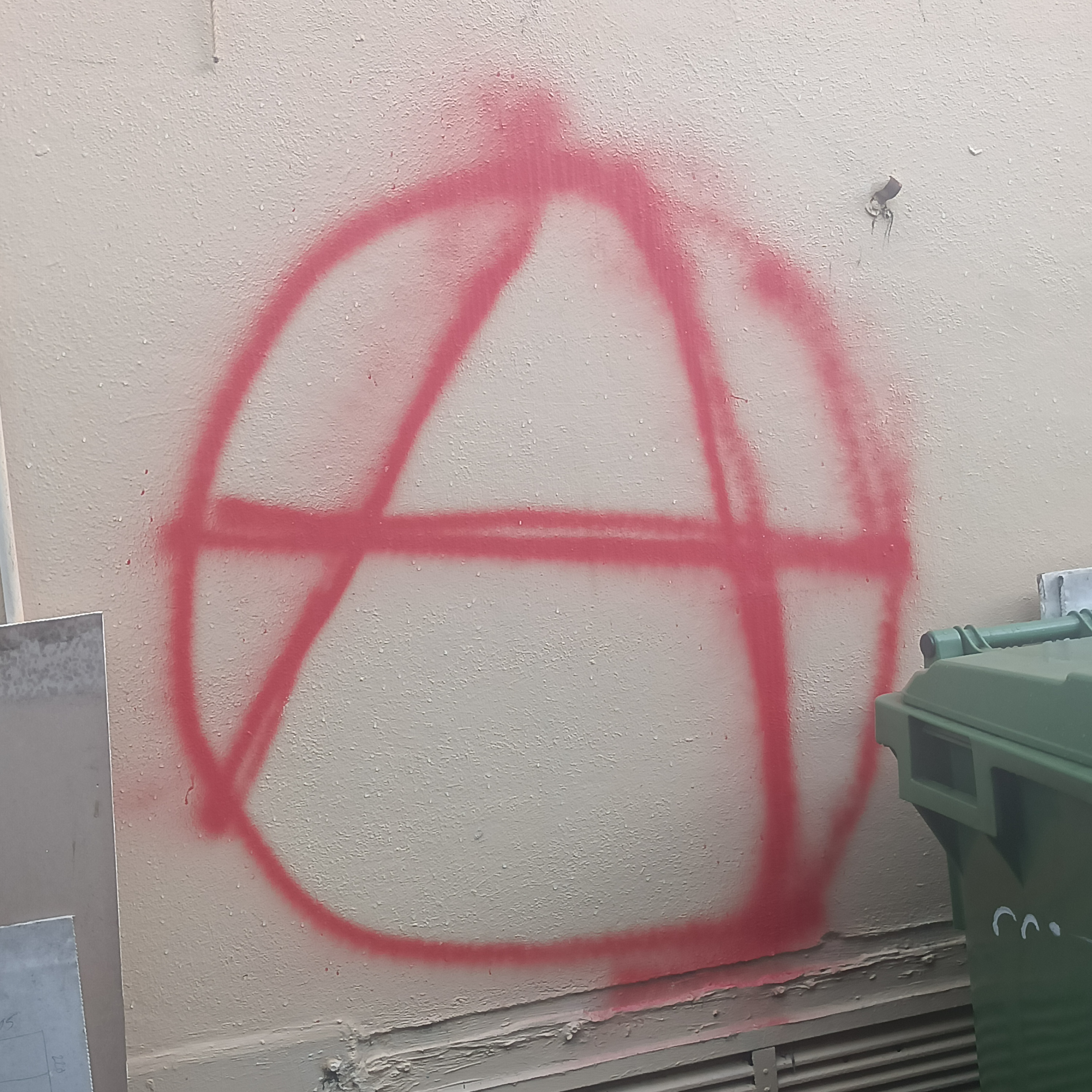
Circle-A graffiti on a laneway wall in Sydney. 2026

An interpretation held by some anarchists such as Cindy Milstein is that the A would represent the Greek anarkhia ('without ruler/authority'), and the circle would be read as the letter O, standing for order or organization, a reference to Pierre-Joseph Proudhon's definition of anarchism from his 1840 book What Is Property?: "As man seeks justice in equality, so society seeks order in anarchy" (French: la société cherche l'ordre dans l'anarchie). However, this interpretation is criticized by Ibáñez himself, who notes on the contrary that this idea wasn't debated or a meaning they gave to it at all when creating it. He used the example of the 'punk version' of it, where the lines of the A go beyond the circle, to say that this would not be its meaning at all.

In the 1970s, anarcho-punk and punk rock bands such as Crass began using the circle-A symbol in red, thereby introducing it to non-anarchists. Crass founder Penny Rimbaud would later say that the band probably first saw the symbol while traveling through France.

=== Black cat ===
An IWW stickerette or silent agitator

The origin of the black cat symbol, also known as the "sabocat", is unclear, but according to one story it came from an Industrial Workers of the World strike that was going badly. Several members had been beaten up and were put in a hospital. At that time a skinny, black cat walked into the striker's camp. The cat was fed by the striking workers and as the cat regained its health, the strike took a turn for the better. Eventually the striking workers won some of their demands, and they adopted the cat as their mascot.

The Swiss anarchist Théophile Steinlen made use of the black cat (Le Chat Noir) in a number of his paintings. In an 1890 oil painting, he depicted a black cat raising a red banner emblazoned with the word "Gaudeamus" (English: Rejoice). And in the large landscape painting Apotheosis of the Cats of Montmartre, he showed a clowder of cats on the rooftops of a working-class Parisian neighbourhood, beneath the moon. Francophone anarchists like Steinlen and Zo d'Axa were inspired by the independent and undomesticated nature of the cat.

The name Black Cat has been used for numerous anarchist-affiliated collectives and cooperatives, including a music venue in Austin, Texas (which was closed following a July 6, 2002 fire) and a now-defunct "collective kitchen" in the University District of Seattle, Washington.

== Slogans ==
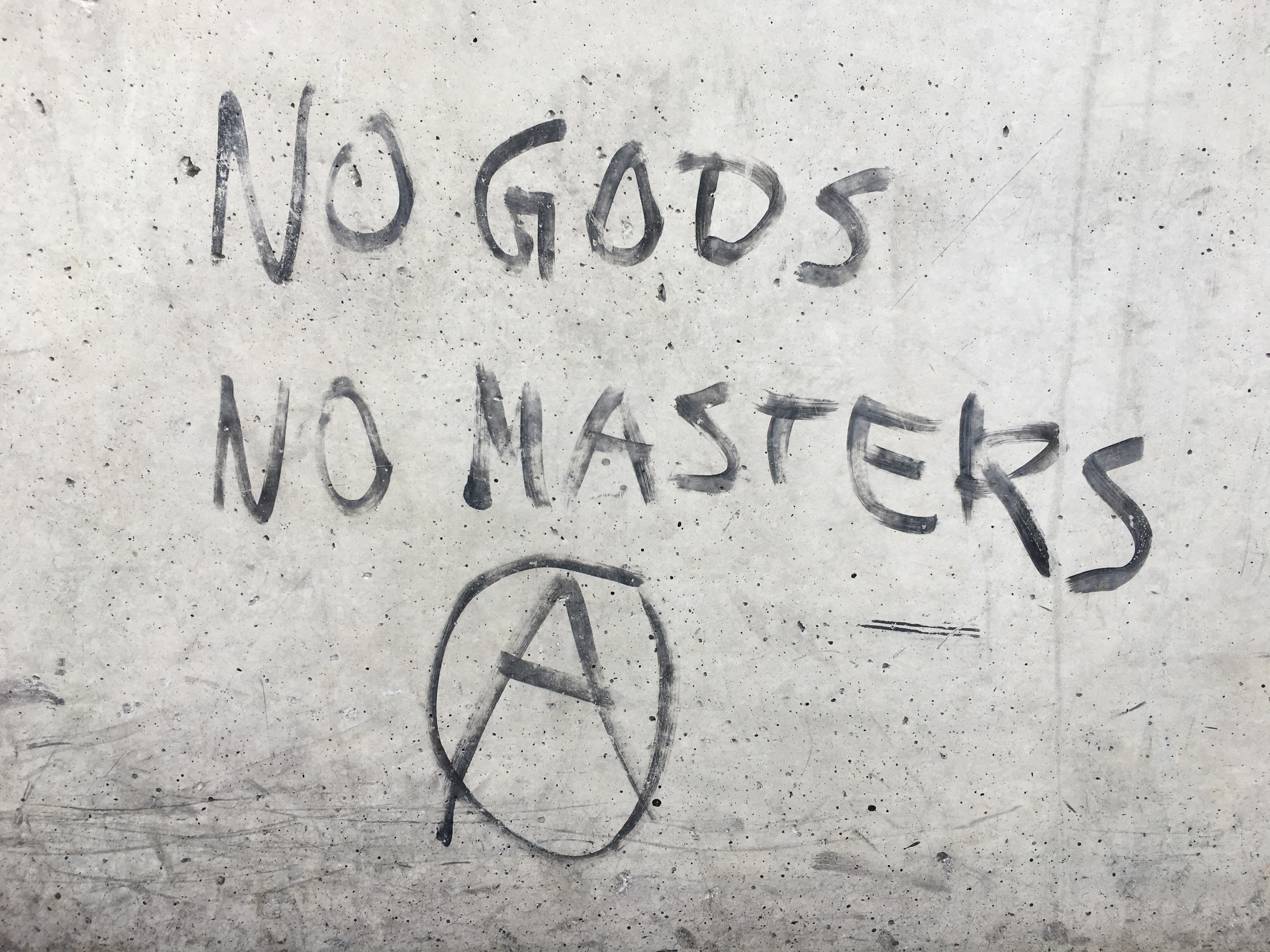
Graffiti with the slogan "no gods, no masters" and the anarchist "A" symbol on a concrete wall in the central bus station of Munich, Germany, in 2022

=== Do as you wish! Do what you want! ===
"Do as you wish! Do what you want!" is a slogan of Errico Malatesta's Anarchist Program. It is explained in his pamphlet Anarchy.

The freedom we want, for ourselves and for others, is not an absolute metaphysical, abstract freedom which in practice is inevitably translated into the oppression of the weak; but it is real freedom, possible freedom, which is the conscious community of interests, voluntary solidarity. We proclaim the maxim DO AS YOU WISH, and with it we almost summarize our program, for we maintain—and it doesn't take much to understand why—that in a harmonious society, in a society without government and without property, each one will WANT WHAT HE MUST DO.

=== No gods, no masters ===
"No gods, no masters" is a phrase associated with anarchist philosophy and the leftist labor movement. A similar phrase appeared in an 1870 pamphlet by a disciple of Auguste Blanqui. The exact phrase appeared as the title of Blanqui's 1880 newspaper Ni Dieu ni Maître before it spread throughout the anarchist movement, appearing in Kropotkin's 1885 Words of a Rebel and an 1896 Bordeaux anarchist manifesto. Sébastien Faure resuscitated the slogan during World War I, after which Paris's Libertarian Youth adopted the name. It has appeared on tombstones of revolutionaries, as the slogan of birth control activist Margaret Sanger's newspaper The Woman Rebel, and as the title of a 1964 song against capital punishment by Léo Ferré. In the 21st century, it has featured as a slogan for the secularization of Croatia.

== See also ==
- Anarchism and the arts
- Anarchist Black Cross
- Anarchist schools of thought
- Black bloc
- Black rose (symbolism)
- Communist symbolism
- Extinction symbol
- Political colour
- Property is theft!
- Sabotage
- Inflatable rat

== Bibliography ==
- Baylac, Marie-Hélène (2024), Louise Michel, Paris: Perrin, ISBN 978-2262097714
- Bébin, Lionel (1996), Les tentatives de reconstituer la Première Internationale et les débuts du mouvement anarchiste à Lyon (mémoire) [The Attempts to Reconstruct the First International and the Beginnings of the Anarchist Movement in Lyon, 1871–1881 (memoir)], Lyon: University Lyon II
- Woodcock, George (1986). Anarchism: A History of Libertarian Ideas and Movements. Penguin. ISBN 978-0-14-022697-3.
