= Sanne Ledermann =

Friend of Anne and Margot Frank (1928–1943)

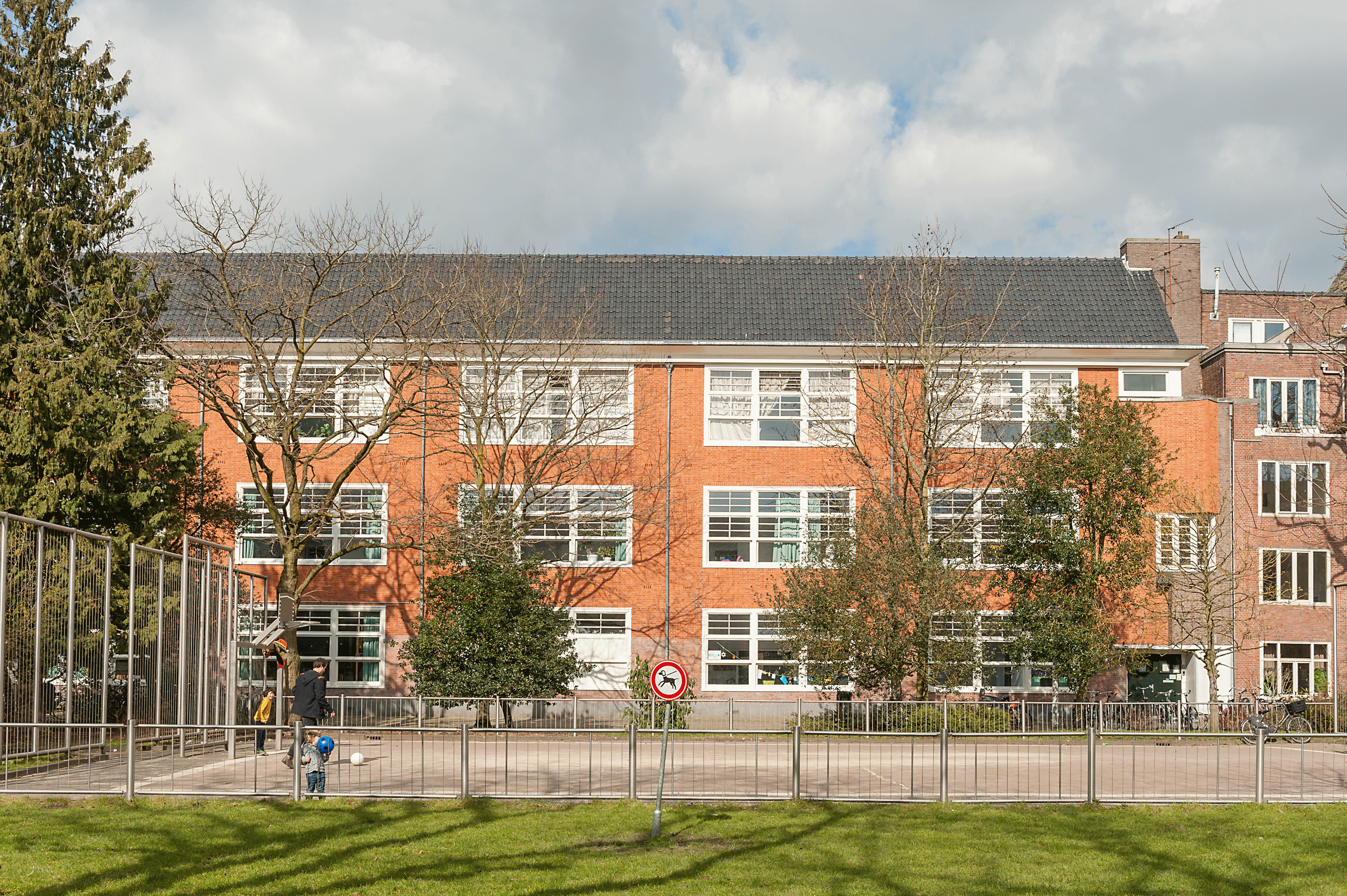
Jeker School in Amsterdam - The Elementary School of Sanne Ledermann.

Susanne Ledermann (7 October 1928 – 19 November 1943) was a German Jewish girl who was murdered in the Auschwitz concentration camp. She was best-known for her friendship with Anne and Margot Frank through her sister Barbara Ledermann.

== Early life and family ==
Sanne was born in Berlin, the younger of two daughters of Franz Ledermann, lawyer and musician, and Ilse Citroën-Ledermann, a pianist. In 1933, when the Nazi party came to power the Ledermanns, were faced with the threat of death due to their Jewish heritage, emigrated to Amsterdam, Netherlands.

Sanne was admitted to the Jeker school, where her sister Barbara and Margot Frank were also admitted. Later in 1940, Eva Schloss, the eventual stepsister of Anne Frank, also attended class with Sanne. In 1940, the Nazis invaded the Netherlands, and Sanne had to move to a Jewish school. Hanneli Goslar and Anne moved to a different Jewish school. However, Sanne still kept good contacts with both Anne and Hanneli, and was a member of the ping pong club Little Dipper Minus Two, named for the Little Dipper constellation, which was formed by her friends (the girls had originally thought the constellation comprised five stars, matching the five girls who were in the club, but later found out that it actually consisted of seven stars; thus they renamed the club Little Dipper Minus Two). In July 1942, Anne and her family (Margot, Otto, and Edith, along with the van Pels family and Fritz Pfeffer) went into hiding, although Sanne didn't know about this.

On 20 June 1943, the Ledermanns were arrested by the Nazis. They were transported to the Westerbork transit camp. The next year they were deported to Auschwitz.

Sanne's elder sister, Barbara, was able to escape the Nazis through her contacts with the Dutch underground. Barbara emigrated to the United States and later married the Nobel Prize winning biochemist Martin Rodbell.

== Sanne in Anne Frank diary ==
Sanne Ledermann was one of Anne Frank's closest friends, including Hannah Goslar and Jacqueline van Maarsen. Sanne is mentioned in Frank's diary several times, and one of the more famous events appears in the diary on 21 June 1942, when Anne was asked to write an essay as a punishment for talking during class.

"It was time to come up with something else, something original. My friend Sanne, who's good at poetry, offered to help me write the essay from beginning to end. I jumped for joy. Keesing was trying to play a joke on me with this ridiculous subject, but I'd make sure the joke was on him. I finished my poem, and it was beautiful! It was about a mother duck and a father swan with three baby ducklings who were bitten to death by the father because they quacked too much. Luckily, Keesing took the joke the right way. He read the poem to the class, adding his own comments, and to several other classes as well. Since then I've been allowed to talk and haven't been assigned any extra homework. On the contrary, Keesing's always is making jokes these days."

Part of the original essay written by Sanne Ledermann appears in Frank's book Tales from the Secret Annex, which is a collection of other events and stories written by Anne Frank besides the diary.

== Jeker School ==
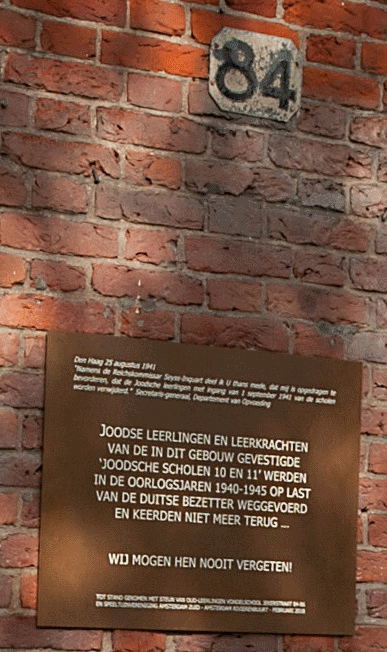
Memorial plaque at the school entrance.

The school is located close to the Merwedeplein square and before the German occupation of the Netherlands, many Jewish students among them Margot Frank, Barbara Ledermann, Sanne Ledermann, Eva Schloss and many others, attended it. At the entrance to the school building is a memorial plaque for the teachers and students who were sent to concentration camps and never returned.

Joodse leerlingen en leerkrachten van de in dit gebouw gevestigde joodsche schoolen 10 en 11 werden in de oorlogjaren 1940 - 1945 op last van de duitse bezetter weggevoerd en keerden niet meer terug. Wij mogen hen nooit vergeten

Jewish students and teachers of the Jewish schools 10 and 11 established in this building were taken during the war years 1940 - 1945 by order of the German occupiers and did not return. We must never forget them!

== See also ==
- People associated with Anne Frank
- Hanneli Goslar
