= Paul Citroen =

Dutch painter and photographer

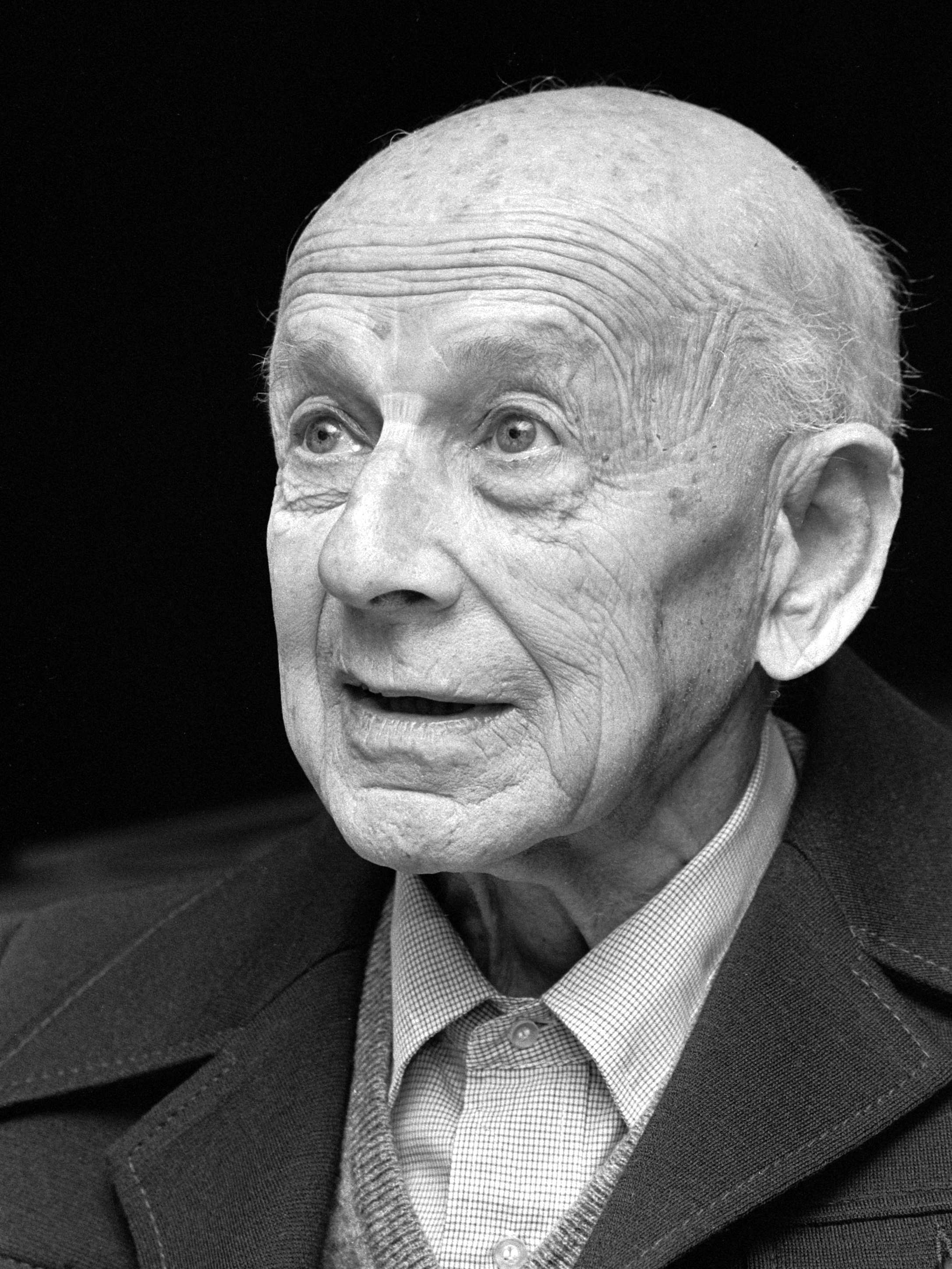
- Citroen in 1981
- Born: Roelof Paul Citroen; 15 December 1896; Berlin, Germany
- Died: 13 March 1983 (aged 86); Wassenaar, Netherlands
- Notable work: Metropolis, postage stamps
- Relatives: Sanne Ledermann (niece)

Roelof Paul Citroen (15 December 1896 – 13 March 1983) was a German-born Dutch artist, art educator and co-founder of the New Art Academy in Amsterdam. Among his best-known works are the photo-montage Metropolis and the 1949 Dutch postage stamps.

== Biography ==
=== Early life ===
Citroen was born and grew up in a middle-class family in Berlin to Hendrik Roelof Citroen (1865–1932), a Dutch Jew from Amsterdam while his mother, Ellen Philippi (1872–1945), was from a Berlin Jewish family. His father owned a fur shop and died in Berlin just before the onset of Nazi Germany while his mother died due to illness at the Bergen-Belsen concentration camp. His sister Ilse Citroen (died with her husband at the Auschwitz concentration camp) was the mother of Sanne Ledermann, a friend of Anne Frank. At an early age, Citroen began drawing, provoking strong support from his parents. He soon started to experiment with photography with Erwin Blumenfeld and studied art in Berlin.

As a painter, he was a Dadaist. As a visual artist in photography, he used the Bauhaus Style of physical portraits, many times with the subject peering intensely into the camera.

Metropolis (1923)

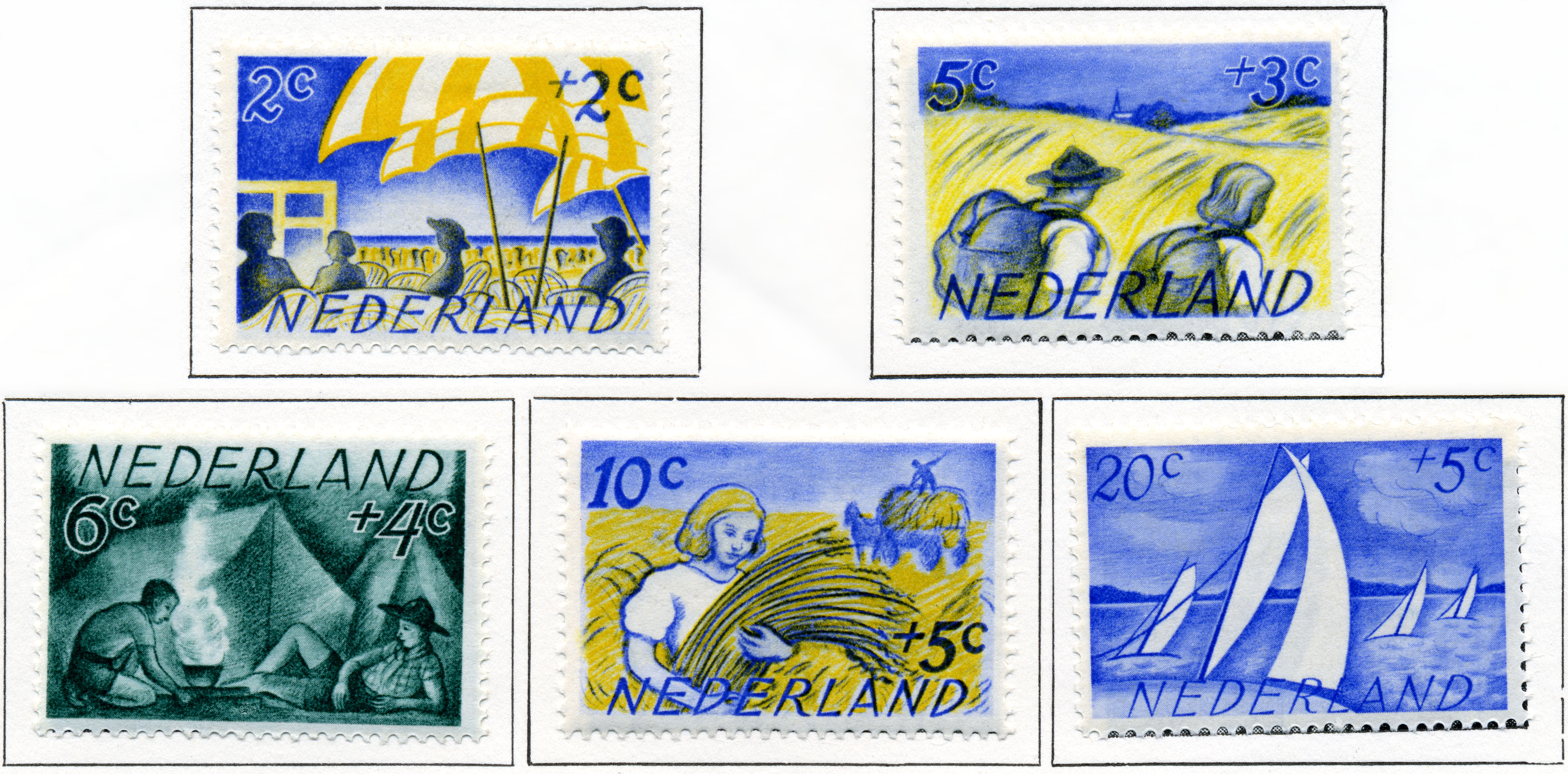
Stamps 1949

In 1919 Citroen began studying at the Bauhaus, where he started taking lessons from Paul Klee and Wassily Kandinsky (part of Der Blaue Reiter) and Johannes Itten, who became one of his biggest influences. Around this time, he started Metropolis (1923), which became his best-known piece. Metropolis is held at the Print Room of Leiden University Libraries. A digital version is available via Leiden's Digital Collections. Metropolis influenced Fritz Lang to make his classic film Metropolis. Between 1929 and 1935, Citroen made many photographs, clearly influenced by his work with Blumenfeld.

Citroen's work was included in the 1939 exhibition and sale Onze Kunst van Heden (Our Art of Today) at the Rijksmuseum in Amsterdam.

=== Later life ===
He soon started up the Nieuwe Kunstschool (New Art School) with Charles Roelofsz. It ran out of money and closed down in 1937. That year, Citroen became a scholar at the Royal Academy of Art in The Hague. When Citroen was warned that he was due to be arrested on 28 August 1942, he fled to Maria Helena Friedlaender (née Bruhn), a German woman, wife of Henri Friedlaender. She hid him with other fugitives in the attic of her house in Wassenaar, South Holland, for several months.

Among his many students are Kees Bol, Madeleine Gans, Henk Hartog, and Jos Zeegers. He designed his monumental postage stamps in 1949. In 1960 he stopped teaching and started painting portraits as his main focus. He painted portraits of famous Dutch people, including a well-known portrait of Liesbeth List in 1979.

Paul Citroen died in 1983 in Wassenaar.

In 2021, two photographs by Citroen (Portrait of the dancer Estella Reed and photocollage Metropolis) were included in the Netherlands Photo Museum's permanent exhibition Gallery of Honour of Dutch Photography, consisting of 99 photographs.

== Public collections ==
- Kunstmuseum Den Haag
- Hermann-Hesse-Museum, Calw
- Literatuurmuseum, Den Haag
- Museum De Fundatie, Zwolle
- Rijksmuseum Amsterdam
- Leiden University Libraries Prentenkabinet
- Stedelijk Museum Amsterdam
- MoMA, New York
- Metropolitan Museum of Art, New York
- Art Institute of Chicago
