= The Funeral of the Anarchist Galli =

Painting by Carlo Carrà

- Il Funerale dell’anarchico Galli (Italian)
- Artist: Carlo Carrà
- Year: 1910–1911
- Catalogue: 79225
- Medium: Oil on canvas
- Dimensions: 198.7 cm. × 259.1 cm. (78¼ in. × 102 in.)
- Location: Museum of Modern Art; New York City
- Accession: 235.1948

The Funeral of the Anarchist Galli (Il Funerale dell’anarchico Galli) is a painting by Italian painter Carlo Carrà. It was finished in 1911, during the artist's futurist phase, and is considered Carrà's most famous piece. The piece depicts the violent funeral of anarchist Angelo Galli, an event Carrà witnessed in his early adulthood. The piece was first displayed in 1912 and has been described as chaotic and violent. Since 1948, it has resided in New York City's Museum of Modern Art.

Reception of the piece has praised its use of intense, heavy lines as a means to display movement. The Futurist Manifesto praised Carrà's adaptation of Pablo Picasso’s Cubist techniques in the piece. Critics have noted compositional similarities between The Funeral of the Anarchist Galli and Paolo Uccello's work The Battle of San Romano.

== History ==
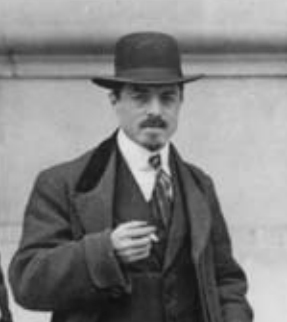
Carrà in 1912, in front of the Le Figaro newspaper building in Paris.

In 1906, anarchist Angelo Galli was killed on the eve of an Italian general strike. The strike had been called after a section of the Milanese Royal Guard fired upon a group of protestors, killing one and injuring eight. Galli was a major organiser of the strike, and was killed on May 10, 1906, after being confronted and stabbed by security guards of the Macchi and Pessoni factory. Galli was alongside anarchists Enrico Recalcati and Carlo Gelosa, and the trio were on their way to a picket. His funeral was planned for May 13, 1906.

The Italian state feared that his funeral would become a de facto political demonstration. In the event, hundreds of people attended, monitored by police on horseback. Police refused to allow the procession of anarchists into the cemetery itself. When the anarchists resisted, the police responded with force and a violent scuffle ensued. Carrà was associated with the Milanese anarchist movement at the time and was present at the funeral. In his autobiography, Carrà recounted the events, stating:

I found myself unwillingly in the centre of it, before me I saw the coffin, covered in red carnations, sway dangerously on the shoulders of the pallbearers; I saw horses go mad, sticks and lances clash, it seemed to me that the corpse could have fallen to the ground at any moment and the horses would have trampled it. Deeply struck, as soon as I got home I did a drawing of what I had seen.

— Carrà, La mia vita (1945)

Carrà in his autobiography would incorrectly attribute Galli's death to the Italian general strike of 1904. The newspaper Corriere della Sera was the first to describe this discrepancy, with some believing that Carrà was attempting to tie himself to a more famous event.

In 1910, Carrà drew a pastel study, Study for Funeral of the Anarchist Galli, in preparation for his work on the final piece. It has been proposed that early renditions of The Funeral of the Anarchist Galli likely resembled the earlier study. In 1911, Carrà visited Paris, coming into contact with Picasso’s Cubism, and changed the canvas design to the piece seen today. Carrà would incorporate Picasso’s technique of fracturing, or using corresponding and overlapping lines to display conflict, as a means to convey harsh movements. Carrà's finished piece was first exhibited in 1912 when Felix Fénéon organized The Italian Futurist Painters exhibition at the Galerie Bernheim-Jeune. Carrà was exhibited alongside other Futurist painters, including Umberto Boccioni, Luigi Russolo, Gino Severini, and Giacomo Balla.

In 1912, the piece was purchased by Borchardt, a German art collector, and displayed in the Galerie Der Sturm, in Berlin. The piece was then sold again in 1914 to Franz Kluxen. By 1920, the piece had been obtained by Herwarth Walden and was displayed again in the Galerie Der Sturm. Between 1920-1948, the piece was purchased from Der Sturm by Paul Citroen. In 1947, the piece was first displayed in New York City's Museum of Modern Art, where it was then bought by the museum the following year. The piece was obtained through funding provided by the Lillie P. Bliss Bequest and has remained with the Museum of Modern Art to this day. The Funeral of the Anarchist Galli is widely considered to be Carrà's most influential piece.

== Description ==
The Funeral of the Anarchist Galli was composed at the height of Carrà's futurist phase. The subject of the work is the funeral of Galli. In the center of the canvas, Galli’s coffin is painted draped in red cloth and uneasily balanced whilst being held aloft. Around the coffin are a series of darkened figures, depicting the anarchists, seemingly engaged in a fight. These figures are illuminated by two light sources emanating from the sun and the coffin. The illumination of Galli's coffin draws focus both to his centrality in the painting and his importance in the historical event depicted. On the left, the police cavalry are shown opposing the anarchists. The top third of the piece is dominated by darkly drawn diagonal lines, indicating banners, lances, flagpoles, and cranes, and drawing parallels to weapons of war. The harsh angles and linework of the painting were designed to show the chaos and energy of the scene presented. Additionally, the rounded bodies and overlapping lines gives the effect of movement. The piece as a whole has been described as violent.

== Analysis and reception ==
While Carrà drew inspiration from Cubism, he stressed dynamism, as opposed to Cubism's static and analytical style. In 1912, the same year the painting was first exhibited, Futurist Manifesto would praise Carrà's use of fracturing in his piece, stating:

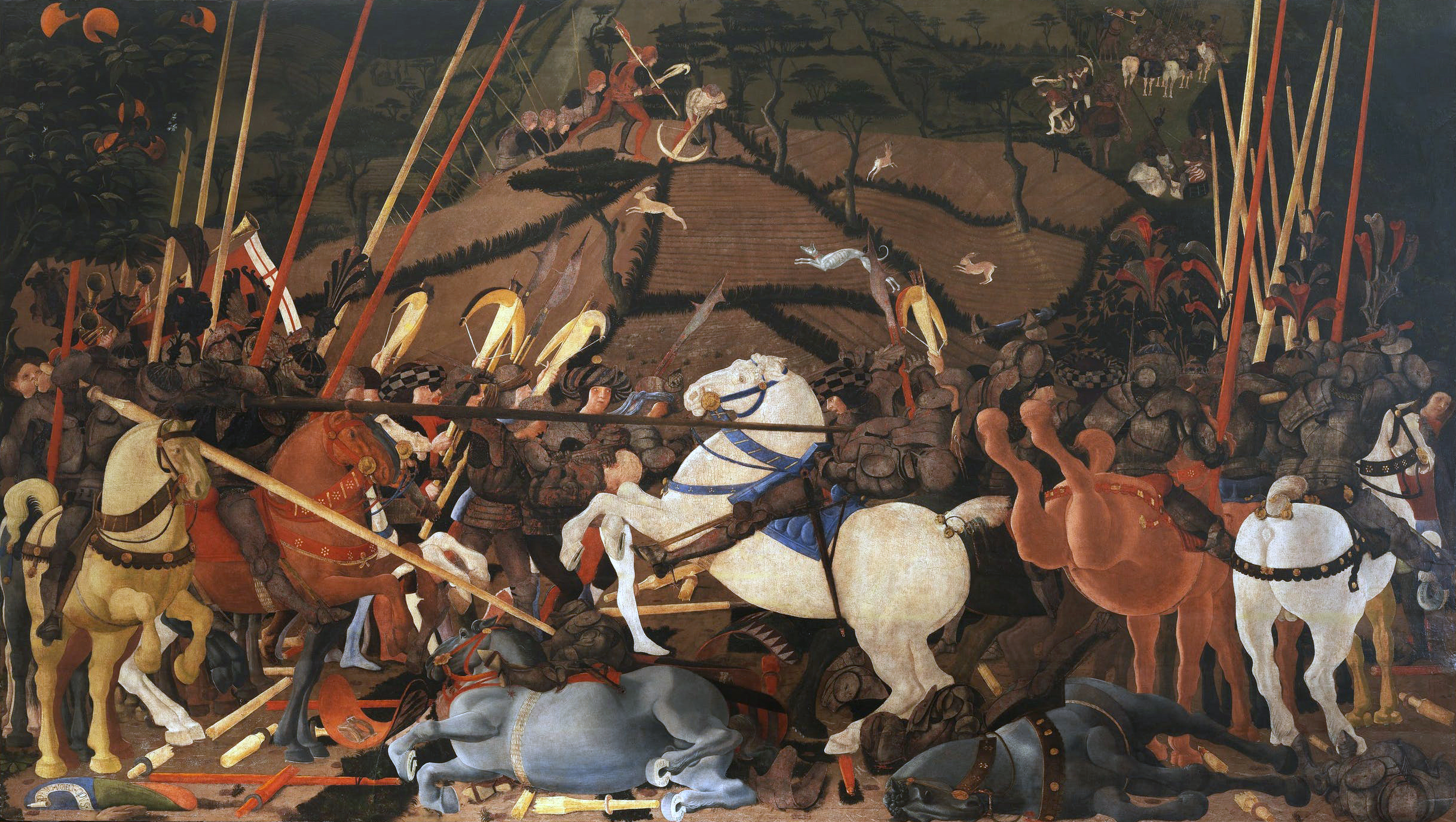
The composition of Funeral has similarities with Paolo Uccello's The Battle of San Romano (Uffizi version shown).

"If we paint the phases of a riot, the crowd bustling with uplifted fists and the noisy onslaught of the cavalry are translated upon the canvas in sheaves of lines corresponding to the conflicting forces, following the general law of violence of the picture. These force-lines must encircle and involve the spectator so that he will in a manner be forced to struggle himself with the persons in the picture."

The piece has been compared to Giuseppe Pellizza da Volpedo’s Fourth Estate (Il Quarto Stato) due to its similar subject matter and ability to establish a "direct relationship between the viewer and the painting". The Funeral of the Anarchist Galli has been noted as "unusual" for Futurist art, owing to its subject, scale, and historical importance. The art historian and former director of the Museum of Modern Art, Alfred H. Barr, Jr., wrote that “fundamentally, in its main lines and masses Carrà’s Funeral is as classically organized as a fifteenth-century battle piece by Paolo Uccello.”

The art historian Dr. Rosalind McKever has also proposed that Funeral is compositionally similar to Uccello's The Battle of San Romano, noting that, "The clash between the anarchists and the police is compositionally closest to the Uffizi version; the dominance of black and red recalls the Louvre version; and the melee of flag poles, lances and cranes jutting into the sky is present in all three." McKever states that Carrà had likely seen The Battle of San Romano prior to the composition of The Funeral of the Anarchist Galli. Author Dr. Mark Antliff has proposed that Carrà's The Funeral of the Anarchist Galli, along with other contemporary Futurists, incorporates the philosophical theories of Henri Bergson, in an attempt to "transform the consciousness of the Italian citizenry and inaugurate a political revolt against Italy's democratic institutions."

Hungarian poet Lajos Kassák wrote a dramatic prose account of the painting in A Tett, a Hungarian arts magazine, in November 1915. In the account, Kassák gave a retelling of the event from the perspectives of the anarchists present. This piece, alongside Kassák's poems calling for pacifism during World War I, led to his work being confiscated by Hungarian authorities and his art being banned from publication.
