= Barbara Ledermann =

German-born Holocaust survivor (born 1925)

- Born: Barbara Charlotte Ledermann; 4 September 1925 (age 101); Berlin, Weimar Republic
- Citizenship: United States, Germany
- Spouse: Martin Rodbell (m. 1950; died 1998)
- Children: 4

Barbara Charlotte Rodbell-Ledermann (née Ledermann; born 4 September 1925) is a German-born American Holocaust survivor. She was the sister of Sanne Ledermann and a good friend of Margot Frank.

== Early life ==
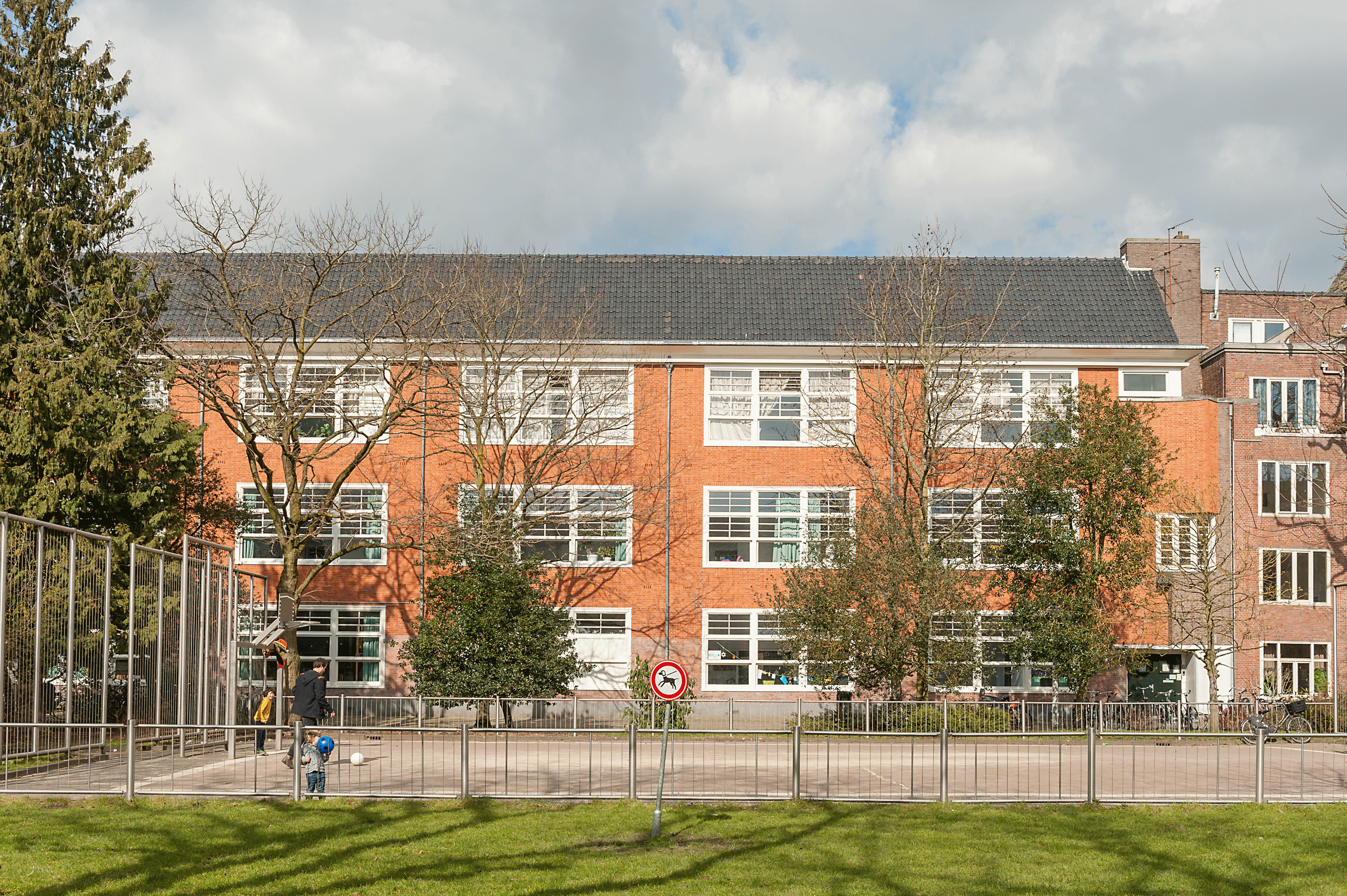
Jeker School in Amsterdam, where she attended with Margot Frank, Eva Schloss and Sanne Ledermann.

Barbara Charlotte Ledermann was born in Berlin in 1925, the first daughter of business lawyer and notary Franz Ledermann (1889–1943) and Dutch pianist Ilse Ledermann-Citroen (1904–1943). Her sister, Sanne (1928–1943), was three years her junior. Her entire family was murdered at Auschwitz concentration camp.

She later emigrated to the United States, and married biochemist Martin Rodbell, who would later win the Nobel Prize. The couple had four children and she was widowed in 1998.
