= The Engineer's Lover =

Painting by Carlo Carrà

- L'amante dell'ingegnere (Italian)
- Artist: Carlo Carrà
- Year: 1921
- Medium: Oil on canvas
- Dimensions: 55 cm × 45 cm (22 in × 18 in)
- Location: Peggy Guggenheim Collection; Venice

The Engineer's Lover (Italian: 'L'amante dell'ingegnere) is a painting by Italian painter Carlo Carrà. It was finished during the artists phase of Pittura Metafisica, or "Metaphysical painting," in 1921.

It portrays an enigmatic head of a maiden on a brown table, flanked by a green panel with a triangle and a compasses (symbols of rationalism). The black background contributes to underline the timeless atmosphere of the scene.

The painting belongs to Gianni Mattioli's collection.
