= Carlo Carrà =

Italian painter (1881–1966)

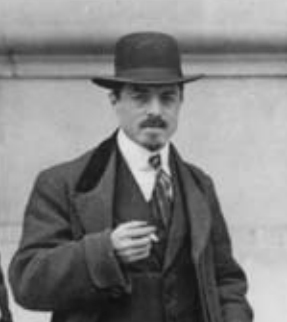
- Carrà in front of Le Figaro, Paris in 1912
- Born: February 11, 1881; Quargnento, Alessandria, Kingdom of Italy
- Died: April 13, 1966 (aged 85); Milan, Italy
- Known for: Painting
- Movement: Futurism; metaphysical art

Signature
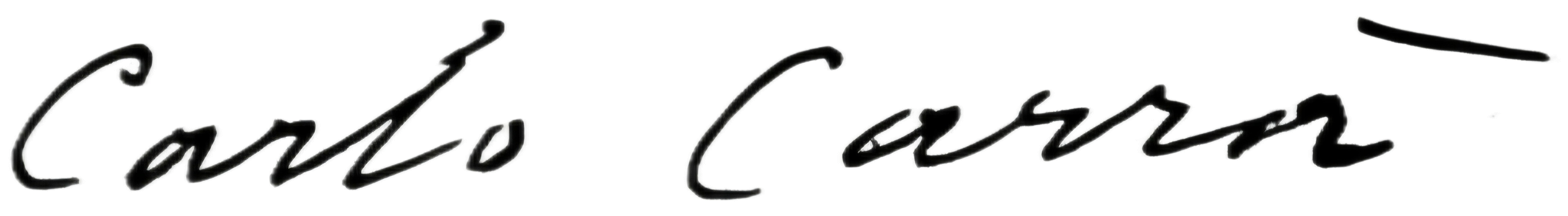

Carlo Carrà (Italian: [ˈkarlo karˈra]; February 11, 1881 – April 13, 1966) was an Italian painter and a leading figure of the Futurist movement that flourished in Italy during the beginning of the 20th century. In addition to his many paintings, he wrote a number of books concerning art. He taught for many years in the city of Milan.

== Biography ==
Carrà was born in Quargnento, a comune just northwest of Alessandria, Italy (Piedmont). At the age of 12 he left home in order to work as a mural decorator.

In 1899–1900, Carrà was in Paris decorating pavilions at the Exposition Universelle, where he became acquainted with contemporary French art. He then spent a few months in London in contact with exiled Italian anarchists, and returned to Milan in 1901. In 1906, he enrolled at Brera Academy (Accademia di Brera) in the city, and studied under Cesare Tallone. In 1910 he signed, along with Umberto Boccioni, Luigi Russolo, and Giacomo Balla the Manifesto of Futurist Painters, and began a phase of painting that became his most popular and influential.

Carlo Carrà, 1912, Woman on the Balcony, (Simultaneità, La donna al balcone), Collezione R. Jucker, Milan, Italy

Carrà's Futurist phase ended around the time World War I began. His work, while still using some Futurist concepts, began to deal more clearly with form and stillness, rather than motion and feeling. In his 1913 manifesto, "The Painting of Sounds, Noises and Smells," Carrà discussed his interest in synaesthesia, describing it as "being a perceptual phenomenon that relates to the idea that exposure to one external stimulus (say, sound or smell), induces a parallel visualization (say, color)."

Inspired by Trecento painting, children's art, and the work of Henri Rousseau, Carrà soon began creating still lifes in a simplified style that emphasized the reality of ordinary objects. In 1917 he met Giorgio de Chirico in Ferrara, and worked with him there for several weeks. Influenced by de Chirico, Carrà began including mannequin imagery in his paintings. The two artists were the innovators of a style they called "metaphysical painting". By 1919, Carrà's metaphysical phase was giving way to an archaicism inspired by the works of Giotto, whom he admired as "the artist whose forms are closest to our manner of conceiving the construction of bodies in space". Carrà's painting The Daughters of Lot (1919) exemplifies the new direction of his work. He was among the contributors of the Rome-based literary magazine La Ronda between 1919 and 1922. Throughout the 1920s and 1930s, he concentrated mainly on landscape painting and developed a more atmospheric style. An example from this period is his 1928 Morning by the Sea.

Carrà is best known for his 1911 Futurist work, The Funeral of the Anarchist Galli. He was indeed an anarchist as a young man but, along with many other Futurists, later held more reactionary political views, becoming ultranationalist and irredentist before and during the war. He supported fascism after 1918. In the 1930s, Carrà signed a manifesto in which called for support of the state ideology through art. The Strapaese group he joined, founded by Giorgio Morandi, was strongly influenced by fascism and responded to the Neo-classical guidelines which had been set by the regime after 1937, but was opposed to the ideological drive towards strong centralism.

Carrà died in Milan, Italy on April 13, 1966 at age 85.

== Selected works ==
- The Funeral of the Anarchist Galli (1911)
- The Enchanted Chamber (1917)
- The Metaphysical Muse (1917)
- The Daughter of the West (1919)
- The Engineer's Lover (1921)
- Canale a Venezia (1926)
1911, The Funeral of the Anarchist Galli, oil on canvas, 198.7 x 259.1 cm, Museum of Modern Art, New York

1911, Rhythms of Objects (Ritmi d'oggetti), oil on canvas, 53 x 67 cm, Pinacoteca di Brera

1917, Il cavaliere dello spirito occidentale (Western Horseman), 52 x 67 cm, private collection

1918, L'Ovale delle Apparizioni (The Oval of Apparition), oil on canvas, 92 x 60 cm, Galleria Nazionale d'Arte Moderna, Rome, or Collezioni R. Jucker, Milan

1919, Le figlie di Loth, oil on canvas, 111 x 80 cm, Museum of Modern and Contemporary Art of Trento and Rovereto

== Sources ==
- Carrà at the Peggy Guggenheim Collection
- Carrà at the Mart, Museo d'Arte Moderna e Contemporanea di Trento e Rovereto
- Antliff, Mark (March 2002). "Fascism, Modernism, and Modernity". The Art Bulletin. 84 (1). Archived from the original on November 9, 2007 – via FindArticles.
- Elizabeth Cowling and Jennifer Mundy, On Classic Ground: Picasso, Léger, de Chirico and the New Classicism 1910-1930, London:, Tate Gallery, 1990 ISBN 1-854-37043-X
- Karen Pinkus, Bodily Regimes: Advertising under Italian Fascism, Minneapolis-Saint Paul, University of Minnesota Press, 1995 ISBN 0-8166-2563-8
- Stanislao G. Pugliese, Italian Fascism and Anti-Fascism: A Critical Anthology, Manchester, Manchester University Press, 2001 ISBN 0-7190-5639-X
