= Tales from the Secret Annex =

Short story collection by Anne Frank

- Author: Anne Frank
- Original title: Verhalen rondom het Achterhuis (Dutch)
- Language: Dutch
- Genre: Short stories, Memoir, Autobiography
- Publisher: Contact Publishing
- Publication date: 1949, revised 2003
- Publication place: The Netherlands
- Media type: Print (Paperback)
- Pages: 160 pp
- ISBN: 978-0-553-56983-4
- OCLC: 31745749
- Preceded by: The Diary of a Young Girl

Tales from the Secret Annex is a collection of miscellaneous prose fiction and non-fiction written by Anne Frank while she was in hiding during the Nazi occupation of The Netherlands. It was first published in The Netherlands in 1949, then in an expanded edition in 1960. A complete edition appeared in 1982, and was later included in the 2003 publication of The Revised Critical Edition of The Diary of Anne Frank. These stories show what life in the Annex was like. For example, one story describes Mrs. Van D’s ‘dentist appointment’. Others show life before the Annex, such as telling on the class for cheating. Anne also describes loneliness in the Annex, like missing her friends.

A revised British edition was published in 2010 by Halban Publishers.

Along with her posthumously published diary, written in hiding between 1942 and 1944 and published in 1947, Anne Frank wrote short stories, essays, personal recollections, and the first five chapters of a novel. The latter was written in the back half of one of her diary notebooks, while the short pieces were compiled into a journal begun on September 2, 1943. Entitled Verhaaltjes, en gebeurtenissen uit het Achterhuis beschreven door Anne Frank (Stories and events from the Backhouse described by Anne Frank), it was recovered with her other manuscripts from her hiding place by Miep Gies and Bep Voskuijl following Anne Frank's arrest by the Gestapo on August 4, 1944.
