= Cindy Milstein =

American anarchist activist

Cindy Milstein is an American anarchist activist based in Brooklyn. They are an Institute for Anarchist Studies board member.

== Biography ==
Milstein has also been involved with the Institute for Social Ecology, and are currently a board member with the Institute for Anarchist Studies and a co-organizer of the Renewing the Anarchist Tradition conference. They speak regularly in public, at anarchist conferences and bookfairs as well as radical spaces, including the Finding Our Roots conference, the Unschooling Oppression conference, the Montreal Anarchist Bookfair, the Bay Area Bookfair, the New York Anarchist Book Fair, and Left Forum, among others. Milstein was an active member of Occupy Philadelphia.

== Works ==
External audio
- Milstein on mending the world as Jewish anarchists, June 2021

- Constellations of Care: Anarcha-Feminism in Practice (2024). London: Pluto Press.
- Try Anarchism for Life: The Beauty of Our Circle (2022).
- There Is Nothing So Whole as a Broken Heart (2021)
- Deciding For Ourselves: The Promise of Direct Democracy, Cindy Millstein (ed), AK Press (Chico, Edinburgh, 2020), ISBN 9-781849-353731
- Rebellious Mourning: The Collective Work of Grief, Cindy Millstein (ed), AK Press (2017), ISBN 9781849352840
- Anarchism and Its Aspirations (2010)

== See also ==
- John Petrovato
- Chuck W. Morse
- Ashanti Alston
- Murray Bookchin
