= Stirling High School =

Coordinates: 56°06′18″N 03°56′45″W

Location
- Torbrex Farm Road; Torbrex, Stirling; Scotland

Information
- Type: State
- Motto: "Tempori Parendum" - Be Prepared for Your Time
- Established: 1129; 897 years ago
- Head Teacher: Ally Macleod
- Enrolment: 1067
- Website: http://www.stirlinghigh.co.uk/

Stirling High School is a state high school for 11- to 18-year-olds run by Stirling Council in Stirling, Scotland. It is one of seven high schools in the Stirling district, and has approximately 972 pupils. It is located on Torbrex Farm Road, near Torbrex Village in the suburbs of Stirling, previously being situated on the old volcanic rock where Stirling Castle lies and on Ogilvie Road.

The headteacher of the school is Ally Macleod. The school operates a house system. The five houses are Douglas, Eccles, Randolph, Snowdon and Stewart.

Originally established for the training of ecclesiastics, it began as the seminary of the Church of the Holy Rude, founded in the reign of David I in 1129. Both the church and school, along with those of Perth, were brought under the charge of the monks of the Church of the Holy Trinity of Dunfermline in 1173.

== School buildings ==
The school operates from a building on the site of Williamfield cricket pitch, former home to Stirling County Cricket Club. The building had an official opening ceremony on 26 June 2008, which consisted of a ribbon cutting by former pupil Kirsty Young.

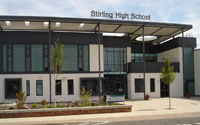
The new school building

=== Private Finance Initiative ===
The new school was financed by the Public Private Finance initiative, which involves the current site being sold to developers. Over the following years, the developers then lease the school back to the council. The school's facilities management is carried out by FES FM Ltd rather than Stirling Council. Teaching, administration and catering continue to be provided by Stirling Council.

=== Location ===
The school sits adjacent to St Ninian's Primary School. It was built on a greenfield site of the old cricket club. The school's previous site, immediately to the north, has been redeveloped as housing.

== Coat of arms and motto ==
The coat of arms shows Queen Margaret, richly habited and crowned bearing in her right hand a sceptre and in her left a book all proper between two trees of knowledge, to remind us of the remote 12th century, when a bishop of St. Andrews, in whose diocese Stirling was, gave to Queen Margaret's Church of the Holy Trinity of Dunfermline the churches of Perth and Stirling and their schools. The wolf, couchant gardant, at the Queen's feet is taken from the "Small" Burgh seal, and reflects the early interest in education taken by the magistrates of the Royal Burgh, for later charters speak of scholam de Striuelin, and Scholam ejusdam ville, which suggest that the 'Church' school fairly soon became the town's school.

The Latin motto Tempori Parendum translates to 'Be prepared for your time'.

== The Old School ==
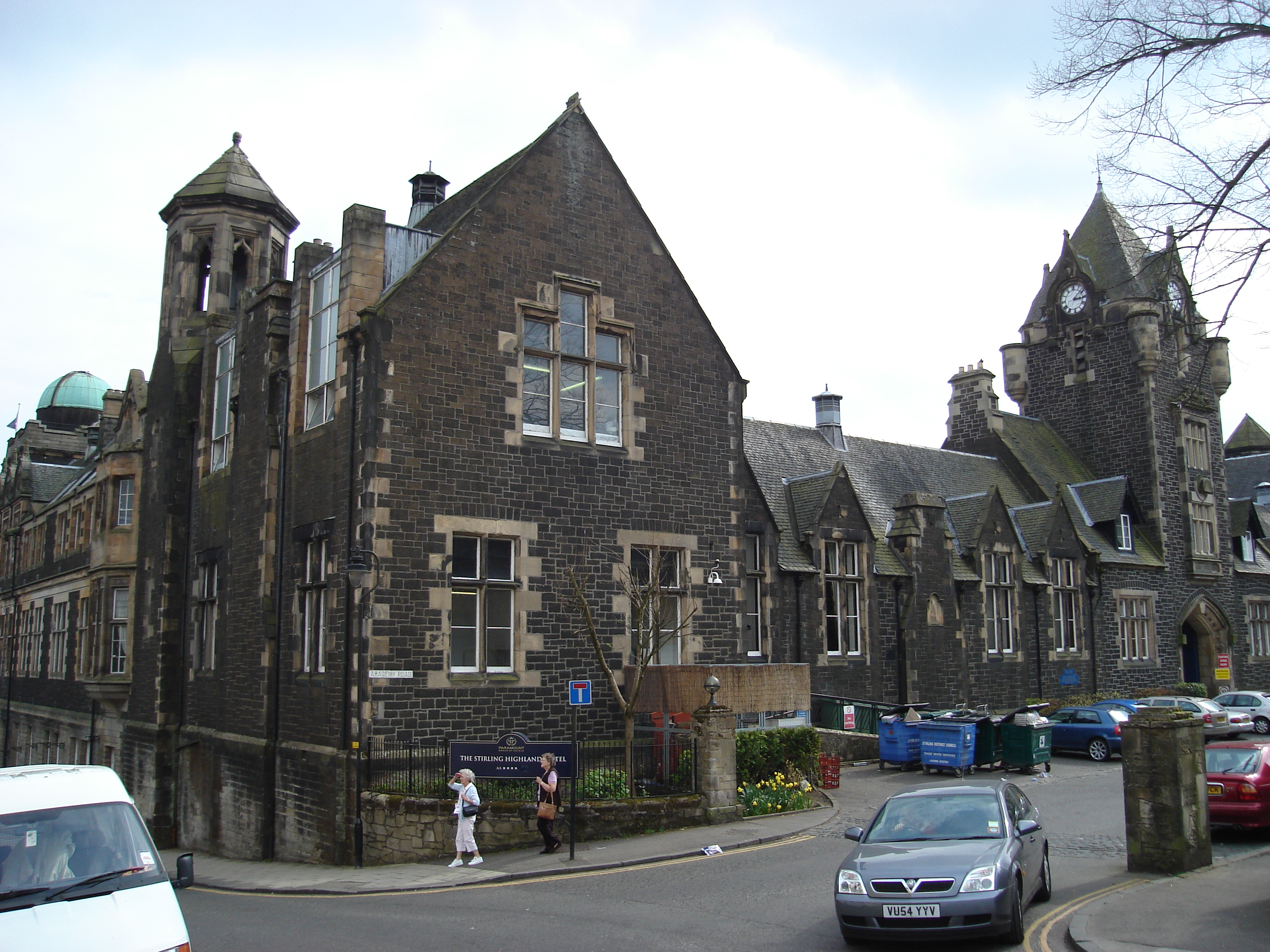
The 1850s building

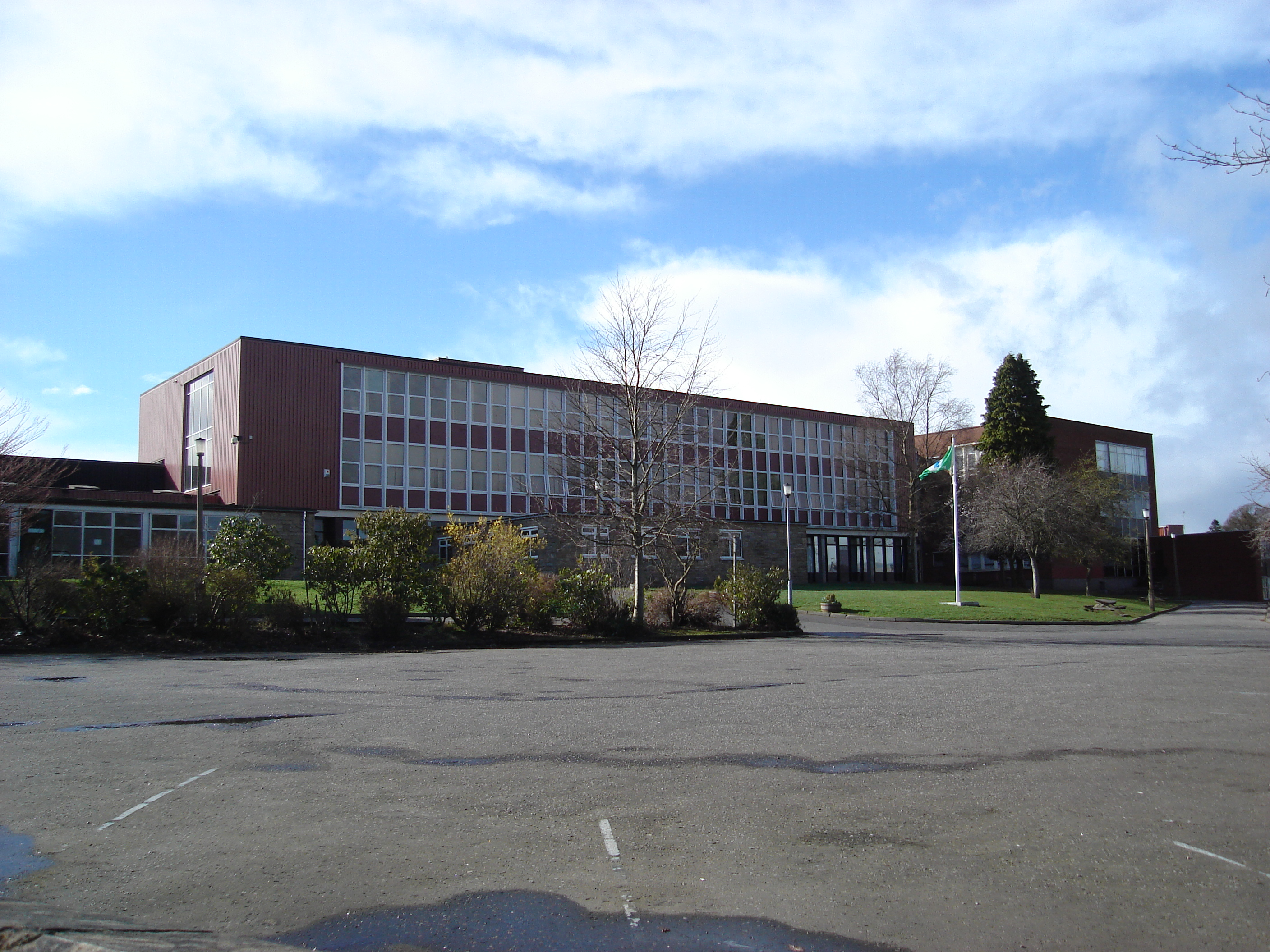
The previous, 1960s era, High School of Stirling building

The High School of Stirling has been housed in several buildings. In 1856 the high school was housed in a purpose-built building on Spittal Street. This held classrooms for mathematics, English, modern languages, art and classics, as well as a gymnasium, and an observatory on the roof. This school was open until 1962, after the Education (Scotland) Act 1872 which made education compulsory for children aged 5 to 13 and increased the intake of pupils for the school, when the school moved from its place at the top of the town to Torbrex. The 1856 building is now the Stirling Highland Hotel.

The school's home from 1962 onwards has been near the village of Torbrex.

The school has a heritage room managed by the Former Pupil Association, holding the school Remembrance Book, various whole school photographs and oak panelling from the Rector's office of the Spittal Street Building. The War Memorial Window, stained glass windows from the 1850s building, and the House Captain Board are displayed in the foyer of the school.

== Notable former pupils ==
- Kieron Achara - Basketball player
- William A.F. Browne (1805–1885) - first president of the Medico-Psychological Association
- Sir David Bruce KCB (1855–1931) - bacteriologist
- Andrew Faulds - actor and Labour Party politician
- Patrick Forbes - 17th-century Bishop of Aberdeen
- Linda Gilroy - Labour and Co-operative Member of Parliament
- John Grierson (1898–1972) - filmmaker
- Robert Henry - historian
- Ally Hogg - Scottish international rugby player
- Ramsey Kanaan, publisher and distributor of anarchist literature; founded AK Press; was the singer of Scottish anarcho-punk band Political Asylum.
- James MacLaren - architect
- Norman McLaren (1914–1987) - animator and film director
- Muir Mathieson (1911–1975) - conductor
- Sir John Murray - oceanographer
- Allardyce Nicoll (1894-1976) - scholar of literature and drama
- Craig Oliver - BBC media executive and Downing Street Director of Communications
- Steven Paterson - SNP MP for Stirling
- Sir Craig Reedie - chairman of the British Olympic Association
- Helen Renton - Director of the Women's Royal Air Force
- Kathryn Samson - Television Journalist
- Sir Josiah Symon KCMG - Attorney-General of Australia
- Gregor Tait - Scottish international swimmer and 2006 Commonwealth Games 200m backstroke and 200m individual medley champion
- Prof John Mitchell Watt - pharmacologist
- Kirsty Young - television journalist

== See also ==
- List of the oldest schools in the United Kingdom

== Bibliography ==
History of the High School of Stirling by A. F. Hutchison, Rector of the school 1866 - 1896. The Sentinel Press (Eneas Mackay), Stirling, 1904.
