= Richie Unterberger =

American writer; music critic (born 1962)

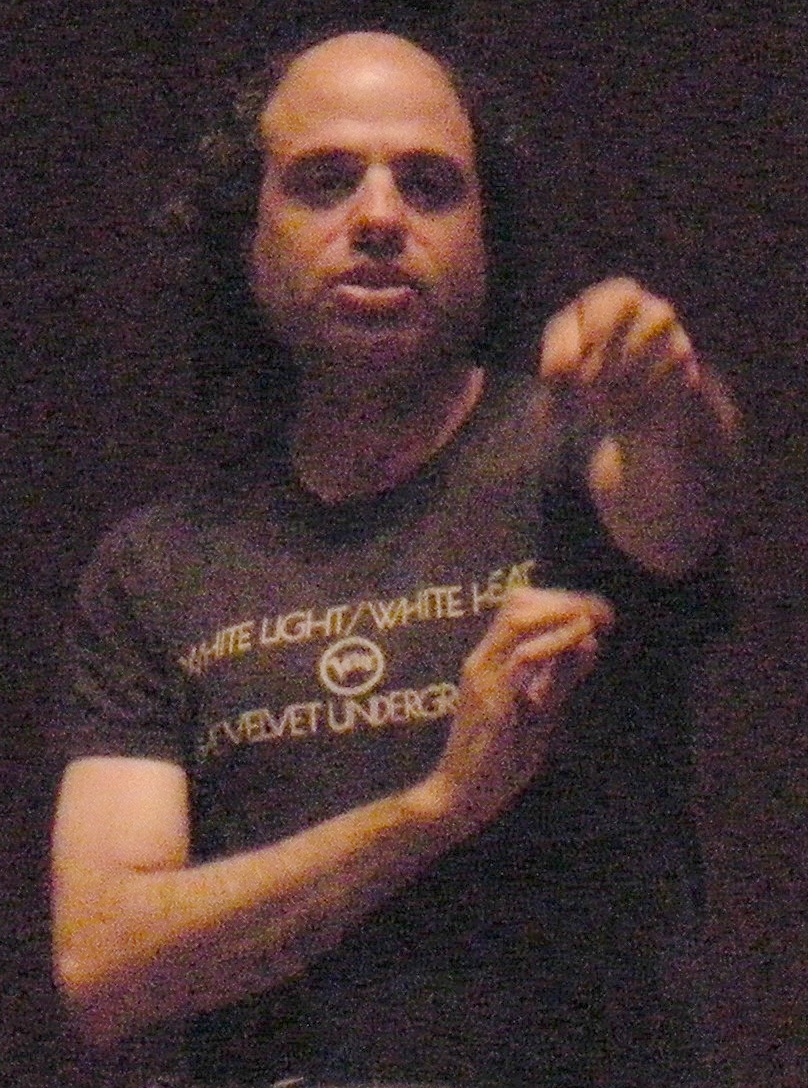
- Unterberger in 2009
- Born: 1962 (age 63–64); United States
- Citizenship: USA
- Education: University of Pennsylvania
- Occupations: Author; journalist; music critic; travel writer
- Writing career
- Language: English
- Genres: Music criticism; rock history; travel
- Notable work: The Unreleased Beatles, White Light/White Heat: The Velvet Underground Day-by-Day, Fleetwood Mac: The Ultimate Illustrated History
- Website: richieunterberger.com

Richie Unterberger (born 1962) is an American author and journalist whose focus is popular music and travel writing.

== Life and writing ==
Unterberger attended the University of Pennsylvania, where he wrote for the university newspaper The Daily Pennsylvanian and in the early 1980s was a deejay on the Penn radio station, WXPN-FM. Just prior to graduating in late 1982, he started reviewing records for Op magazine, which marked the start of his career as a freelance writer.

From 1985 to 1991, Unterberger was an editor for Option. Since 1993, he has been a prolific contributor to AllMusic, the on-line database of music biographies and album reviews, for which he has written thousands of entries, and many of his on-line contributions have been printed in the AllMusic guide series. Unterberger contributes to various local and national publications, including Mojo, Record Collector, Rolling Stone, Oxford American, and No Depression. He has written liner notes for dozens of CD reissues from labels like Rhino Records, Collectors' Choice, and Sundazed.

Unterberger's books draw extensively on first-hand interviews with musicians and their associates.

=== Travel writing; public speaking ===
Unterberger has given talks on music and popular culture at public libraries in San Francisco, Berkeley, and San Mateo County, California. He is also a speaker at area bookstores, including The Booksmith in the Haight Ashbury neighborhood of San Francisco.

Unterberger has also written on travel, including The Rough Guide to Seattle (1996), and co-authored The Rough Guide to Shopping with a Conscience (2007), a book about ethical products, investment, and related topics. He has traveled to more than thirty countries and is an advocate of independent travel and alternative culture.

=== Family ===
His nephew, Andrew, formerly wrote for Stylusmagazine.com, and in 2007 was part of the winning team on VH1's World Series of Pop Culture. He has been a staff writer or featured contributor on music and sports blogs.

== Selected publications ==
His books include:

- 1998: Unknown Legends of Rock'n'Roll. Profiles of 60 underappreciated cult rock artists of all styles and eras
- 1999: The Rough Guide to Music USA. A guidebook to the evolution of regional popular music throughout America in the twentieth century
- 2000: Urban Spacemen & Wayfaring Strangers: Overlooked Innovators and Eccentric Visionaries of '60s Rock. Another look at underappreciated cult rock artists
- 2002: Turn! Turn! Turn!: The '60s Folk-Rock Revolution. The first part of a history of folk rock
- 2003: Eight Miles High: Folk-Rock's Flight from Haight-Ashbury to Woodstock. The second part of a history of folk rock
- 2006: The Unreleased Beatles: Music and Film. An illustrated 400-page guide to music that the Beatles recorded but did not release, as well as musical footage of the group that has not been made commercially available (winner of a 2007 Award for Excellence in Historical Recorded Sound Research from the Association for Recorded Sound Collections)
- 2009: White Light/White Heat: The Velvet Underground Day-by-Day
- 2009: The Rough Guide to Jimi Hendrix
- 2011: Won't Get Fooled Again: The Who from Lifehouse to Quadrophenia
- 2014: Jingle Jangle Morning: Folk-Rock in the 1960s. Turn! Turn! Turn! and Eight Miles High in one ebook.
- 2016: Fleetwood Mac: The Ultimate Illustrated History
- 2024: Bob Marley and the Wailers: The Ultimate Illustrated History (Voyageur / Quarto 2024-01-16)
- 2026: Do What You Fear Most: The History of The Velvet Underground
