= Political Asylum (band) =

Scottish anarcho-punk band

- Origin: Stirling, Scotland
- Genres: Anarcho-punk, hardcore punk, melodic hardcore, punk rock
- Years active: 1982–1989, 1991–1993
- Past members: See below

Political Asylum was a Scottish anarcho-punk band formed in Stirling in 1982 and active until 1993. One of the most popular bands within that scene, they played hundreds of gigs across the U.K., Europe and America and were, according to author Ian Glasper, "an integral part of the fiercely independent underground that existed at the time."

== History ==
The band was formed in early 1982 by 15-year-old Stirling High School pupils Ramsey Kanaan (vocals & bass) and Stephen "Cheesy" Brown (guitar). The two began writing songs together despite the fact that Kanaan was an anarchist punk rocker who admired The Mob, Zounds, Dead Kennedys, Black Flag and Hüsker Dü while Brown was a hard rock fan who preferred Motörhead, Saxon, Ozzy Osbourne, Status Quo and Dire Straits. Originally named Distraught, they tried out several potential drummers before settling on schoolmate Chris "Spike" Low, two years their junior, and changing their name to Political Asylum at his suggestion. Low's simple, tom-heavy drumming contributed to an emergent post-punk sound as they worked up a live set and began organising DIY gigs around the Stirling area. These were mostly multi-band benefit gigs held in non-commercial venues, with the proceeds going to the kind of radical causes espoused in the band's lyrics, as would continue to be the case throughout their existence. In the years to come, most of their releases would also be fund-raisers.

By early 1983 the band had an album's worth of material and began looking for a budget studio in which to record it. Finding nothing nearby, they settled on Black Gold Studios, 25 miles away in Blanefield, north of Glasgow, owned by Ian McCredie of 1970s pop group Middle of the Road. Here, in two days, they produced their first release, the 15-track Fresh Hate. Self-released and home-duplicated on cassette, it soon sold over 6000 copies, mainly through fanzines, gigs and tape trading networks. Kanaan soon decided to concentrate solely on vocals and a couple of bass players came and went before the arrival of classmate Norman Thomson in late 1983. After a visit to the London squat of anarcho-punk band The Apostles, Low was kicked out of the band for his militant anarcho stance, which conflicted with the pacifist views of the others. He went on to play for The Apostles, while Kanaan, Brown and Thomson relocated to Edinburgh to go to university. This was also the home of their next drummer, Tam Francis, a member of the Gracemount suburb's punk scene.

Their second cassette release, Valium For The Masses, was recorded in Edinburgh in June and revealed an increasingly heavy metal-influenced guitar style from Brown, as well as setting a precedent for future releases by mixing studio and live recordings. By now the band were playing gigs further afield, including a trip to Belfast to support Subhumans and Conflict, where they were spotted by Tim Bennett of the Bristol-based Children Of The Revolution label. This led to their first vinyl release, the 7-inch EP Winter, which featured new versions of three Fresh Hate songs and a 5-piece lineup which added Francis' Gracemount friend Pete Barnett on rhythm guitar. However, the use of a drum machine on the recording caused tensions within the band. All 3000 copies were sold within a year of its release. Despite this success and a couple of short UK tours, ongoing tension and personality clashes led to the departure of Francis and Barnett in the autumn of 1985.

Reverting to a 4-piece, the band recruited drummer Keith Burns, a university friend of Brown's from Buckhaven, Fife and recorded the five studio tracks featured on the Walls Have Ears cassette release. The new songs highlighted Brown's increasingly accomplished guitar playing along with faster tempos and more intricate, rock-influenced rhythms and arrangements. The band continued to gig constantly, but Thomson decided to leave in the spring of 1986 and was replaced on bass by Ewan Hunt, a school friend of Burns' from Leven, Fife, who had a more virtuosic and melodic style. This lineup played all over the UK and recorded the Someday mini-LP for the Edinburgh label Big Noise. It featured two new songs, along with re-recordings of three tracks from Walls and two from Valium and was co-released by the German punk label We Bite. Following its release, the band played their first European tour in the summer of 1987, the German leg of which was named the 'Seeing Red Tour' by its organisers and co-headliners, the Lübeck-based band Pissed Boys. However, musical differences, which had been brewing for a while, led to Brown's departure after the tour, and he went on to form a hard rock/heavy metal band, also named Seeing Red. They released a single, "Angel", in 1991 and an album, T.V. Degeneration, in 1993 (re-released as Keep The Fire Burning in 2017.)

Brown was replaced by Edinburgh guitarist Stevie Dewar, formerly of Sad Society, who brought a simpler and more direct style. The new lineup gigged extensively, including a second, much longer, European tour in the summer of 1988 where they shared bills with Scream, NOFX, Christ on Parade and Spermbirds, and a lengthy UK tour in early 1989 with Thatcher On Acid and Chumbawamba's Danbert Nobacon. All of the money raised on the latter went to help local anti-Poll Tax groups. A live recording made on this tour formed the basis of the Window On The World LP, which included two new songs plus studio re-workings of the Someday material with Dewar on guitar. However, running out of steam, the band decided to split up following an American tour that summer, during which they gigged with Dead Silence, NOFX, Samiam and MDC. The tour ended at the 924 Gilman Street club in Berkeley, California.

Kanaan then began to concentrate on his radical distribution and publishing house, AK Press, while Dewar moved to Rotterdam, Netherlands and Burns switched instruments, playing lead guitar for indie pop bands The Catburgers and Jesse Garon and the Desperadoes before forming the alternative rock trio Nectar 3.

In 1991, Kanaan and Dewar revived the band with Rotterdam musicians Leo van Setten on bass and Kees de Greef on drums. They recorded the new song "I've Got A Name" and played a short European tour, for which Burns temporarily returned to play drums as De Greef was unable to travel. Marcel van Buren then replaced Van Setten on bass and the band recorded two Burns songs from 1989. These three new songs, along with a live acoustic radio session featuring Van Setten on acoustic guitar, were released the following year as How The West Was Won, a 10-inch mini-LP on the American graphic artist John Yates' Allied Recordings label. Dewar then moved to Göttingen, Germany, and began working with the rhythm section of local band Nancy And I. However, with Kanaan still based in Edinburgh, it became increasingly difficult to keep the band going and the last tour was in 1993, with the final gig in Göttingen.

== Aftermath ==
Kanaan continued to promote the ideals of the band through his AK Press imprint, moving his base to Oakland, California in 1994 and eventually founding another imprint there, PM Press. He also continued to sing, both in local protest-folk group Folk This! and with the South African-inspired Vukani Mawethu choir. Dewar also gravitated towards folk music and in 1998 formed The Assassenachs, a Celtic-inspired acoustic trio based in the Netherlands, who have toured internationally. Nectar 3 released the EP Lost in 1993 and Burns switched instruments again after the band split in 1995, establishing himself as a bass guitarist, although he also returned to drumming for a while, co-founding the heavy metal trio Zapruder with Oi Polloi bassist Roland Wagstaff. They released an album, Obsessive/Compulsive, in 2000.

In 1997, the San Francisco label Broken Rekids released a 21-track CD compilation of Political Asylum's work called Rock, You Sucker. Beginning in 2004, the Finnish label Passing Bells (via Boss Tuneage) re-released almost all of their studio material across four CDs, adding live recordings from 1987 and 1989.

The band's longest-serving bass player, Ewan Hunt, who emigrated to Sydney, Australia in the mid-1990, died of leukemia in December 2015, aged 49.

== Discography ==
- Fresh Hate (1983) studio cassette album, self-released; vinyl LP on No Plan Records (2022)
- Valium For The Masses (1984) studio/live cassette album, self-released
- Winter (1985) studio 7-inch EP, Children Of The Revolution Records
- Walls Have Ears (1986) studio/live cassette album, Lethal Dose Tapes
- Someday (1987) studio 12-inch mini-LP, Big Noise/We Bite Records; expanded CD on Passing Bells Records (2012)
- Seeing Red (1987) live 7-inch split EP with Pissed Boys, FYB Records
- Window On The World (1990) live/studio 12-inch LP, Loony Tunes Records; expanded CD on Passing Bells Records (2012)
- Solitary (1990) live 7-inch EP, Off The Disk Records
- How The West Was Won (1992) studio/live 10-inch mini-LP, Allied Recordings; expanded CD on Passing Bells Records (2012)
- Rock, You Sucker (1997) CD compilation, Broken Rekids
- Winter (2004) CD compilation of 1983–1986 studio material, Passing Bells Records

== Personnel ==
- Ramsey Kanaan – vocals (1982–1989, 1991-1993), bass (1982–1983)
- Stephen "Cheesy" Brown – guitar (1982–1987)
- Chris "Spike" Low – drums (1982–1984)
- John "Flacko" O'Flaherty – bass (1983)
- Ronnie Aitkenhead – bass (1983)
- Norman Thomson – bass (1983–1986)
- Tam Francis – drums (1984–1985)
- Pete Barnett – rhythm guitar (1984–1985), bass (1986)
- Keith Burns – drums, acoustic guitar (1985–1989, 1991)
- Ewan Hunt – bass (1986–1989; died 2015)
- Stevie Dewar – guitar (1987-1989, 1991–1993)
- Leo van Setten – bass, acoustic guitar (1991)
- Kees de Greef – drums (1991)
- Marcel van Buren – bass (1991)
- Ulrich Briese – bass (1993)
- Sönke Peters – drums (1993)
