= Haight Street =

Street in San Francisco, USA

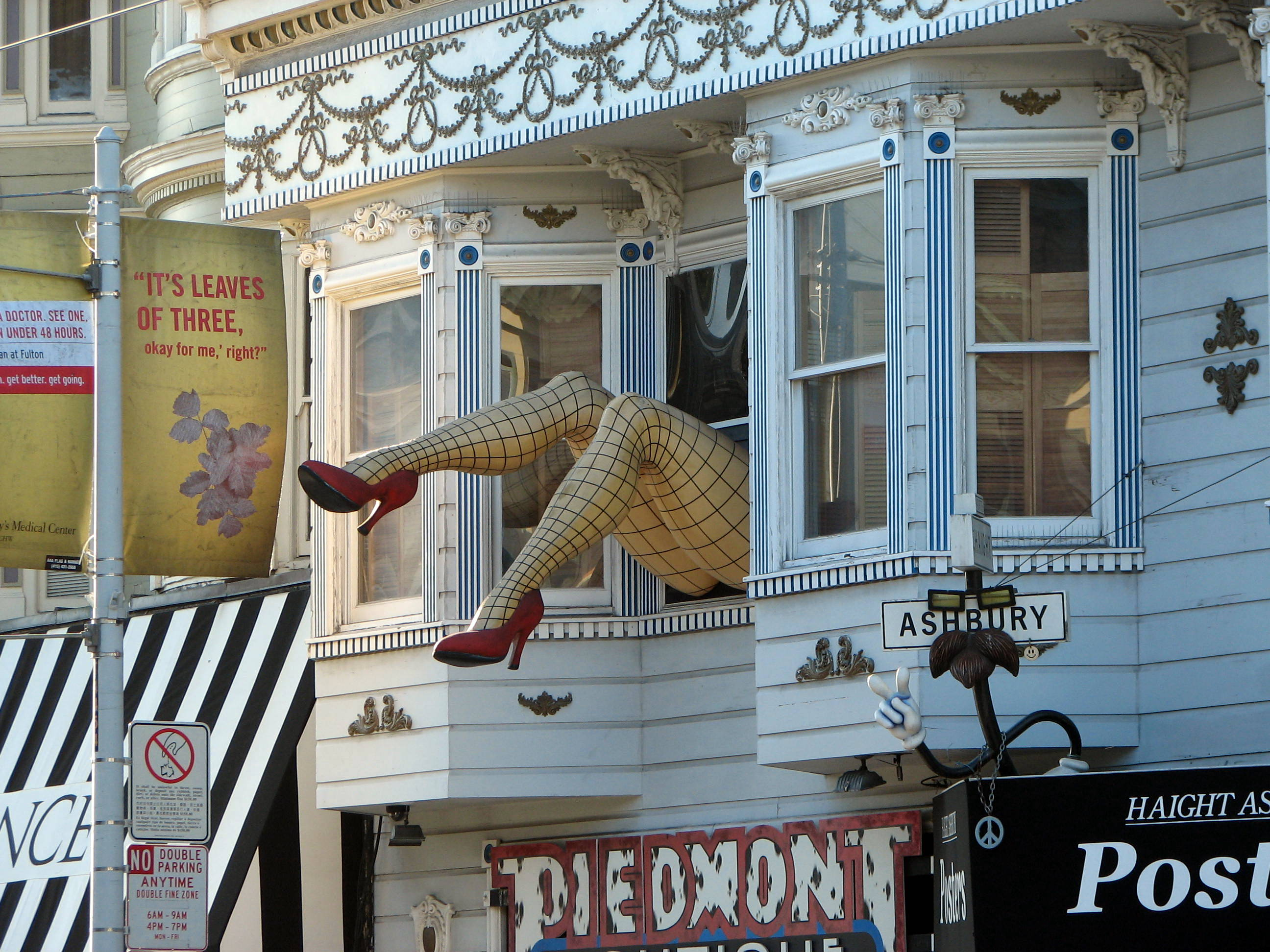
- Piedmont Boutique on Haight Street
- Interactive map of Haight Street
- Location: San Francisco, California
- West end: Stanyan Street
- East end: Market Street

Haight Street (/ˈheɪt-/) is the principal street in San Francisco's Haight-Ashbury district, also known as the Upper Haight due to its elevation. The street stretches from Market Street, through the Lower Haight neighborhood, to Stanyan Street in the Upper Haight, at Golden Gate Park. It is named after Weltha Haight, who for decades helped run the San Francisco Protestant Orphan Asylum.

Haight Street is residential for most of its length, but in the Upper and Lower Haight it is also a neighborhood shopping street, with residences above the ground floor shops. In 2016, local resident Reed Martin put forward a plan, Revolutionize Haight, under which the street would have been pedestrianized except for buses and access at specified times for commercial vehicles, with perpendicular parking on adjacent blocks making up for the loss of parking. Pedestrianization of Haight Street was also one of Mayor London Breed's 2024 proposals as part of San Francisco's Vision Zero campaign to end pedestrian deaths.

== Structures and places fronting on Haight Street ==
- Booksmith
- Bound Together Bookstore Collective
- BlackMan's Art Gallery (1967–1974)
- Buena Vista Park
- Chinese Immersion School at De Avila
- Diggers (theater)
- The Red Victorian
- Rooky Ricardo's Records
