= Chinese Immersion School at De Avila =

School in San Francisco, California, US

Coordinates: 37.769593°N 122.444308°W

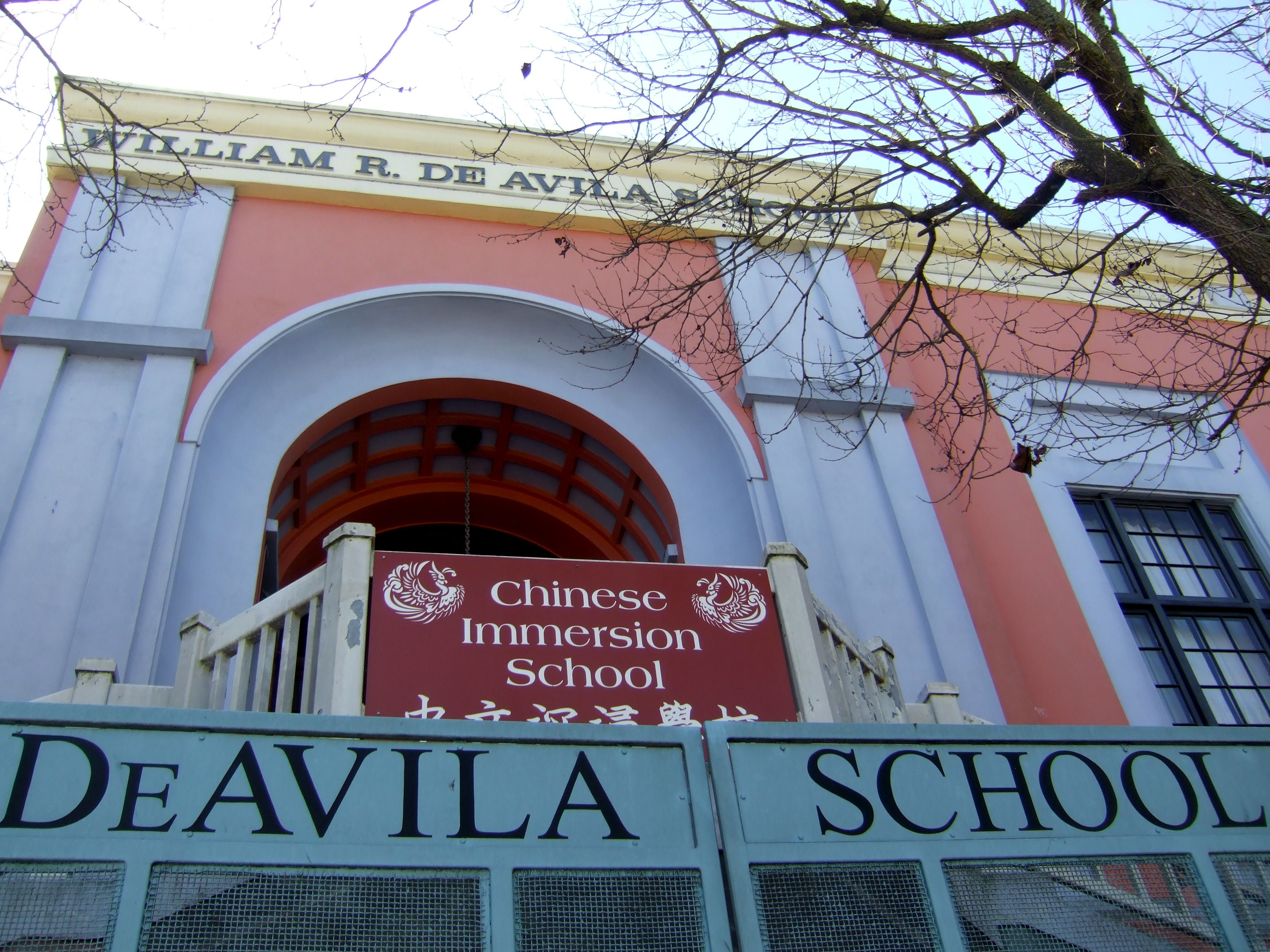
- San Francisco, CA

Information
- Opened: 2009
- School district: San Francisco Unified School District
- Principal: Mia Yee
- Language: Cantonese, Mandarin Chinese, English
- Website: wdaes-sfusd-ca.schoolloop.com

The Chinese Immersion School at De Avila is the latest incarnation of the historic Dudley Stone School, founded in San Francisco, California, in 1896 and surviving the San Francisco Earthquake and Fire of 1906. The kindergarten-through-fifth-grade school provides instruction in Chinese.

== The School Today ==
Established in 2009, the Chinese Immersion School at De Avila is the fifth of San Francisco Unified School District’s Chinese-Immersion programs. Classes began on August 24, 2009, with two first-grade and three kindergarten classes. Additional upper grade classes were to be added each year until the school becomes a full kindergarten-to-fifth-grade elementary school.

Some 80 percent of the instruction is in Cantonese, and a fifth of the school time is devoted to developing English skills. Beginning in the third grade, the students are introduced to Mandarin. The curriculum includes mathematics, science, history, physical education, art, dance and music.

== History ==
=== Dudley Stone School ===
==== Namesake ====
Dudley Stone School was named after Dudley C. Stone, a science teacher and deputy superintendent of the San Francisco City Schools in the 1870s and early 1880s. He was called "one of the pioneer educators of California." Stone was born in Marietta, Ohio, in 1829 and taught in New Orleans, where he was married in 1849 to Mary Ozier, before moving to Santa Cruz, California, in 1852. He opened a private school in Berkeley in 1868 but then joined the public schools in San Francisco as deputy superintendent in 1876.

In an 1879 report, he advocated the establishment of a kindergarten program in San Francisco and, writing in the third person as the deputy school superintendent, he said he was

averse to the present system of written and oral examinations being carried to excess and suggests that but two written examinations be allowed each month, requiring not longer than one hour and a half each. . . . He also recommends a few radical changes in the present course of study, more especially in that of oral instruction, in which more prominence should be given to the elements of physiology, natural philosophy, and civil government in the higher grammar grades. . . . He speaks unfavorably of the Laguna Honda School and deems it unwise and injudicious to the authorities to allow children to make their home at the Almshouse and subject them to the miserable influence of its associations. . . . several reforms are suggested in the teaching of geography and grammar, too much attention being paid to unimportant details, and not sufficient drill upon salient and striking points. He contends that there is far too much corporal punishment in the public schools, and suggests that it be entirely abolished.

Stone was a science teacher in the district's Powell Street normal school, or teacher-training school. On December 1, 1895, he was struck by a streetcar in Oakland, California, and a coroner's jury determined that he "met his death through his own carelessness" inasmuch as the streetcar conductor testified that he "warned Stone several times against alighting." Stone, 68, was hit by another streetcar when he descended to the street.

Stone's widow, Mary Stone, and children, W.S. and Louis S. Stone, Carrie O. Young, Ethel C. Ingalls, Eugenia B. Stanford and Mary E. Strahler, sued the electric railway for damages, alleging that the streetcar that struck him "was running at a high rate of speed and that the motorman in charge of it had left his post on the front platform to collect fares."

==== Campus ====
===== Modern construction =====
Originally called the Dudley C. Stone School, the two-story structure soon had its name changed to Dudley Stone School to match the wording that had been set above the four ionic columns facing Haight Street between Central and Masonic avenues. The schoolhouse stood on an elevation above Haight Street and consisted of a basement 10 feet high and two stories each of 15 feet in height, with the capacity of having another floor added. Designed by Thomas J. Welsh and opened in fall 1896, the building was noted as "the most pretentious of the kind yet erected by the Board of Education" with "special pains" taken "to make the school perfect from a sanitary standpoint."

Two large entrances lead from the street to the basement, which is paved in bitumen. Half of the space, comprising the southern exposure [at the rear of the building], is set off with separate playrooms for the boys and girls in disagreeable weather. The remainder of the basement contains janitor's room, storerooms for wood and coal and the apparatus-rooms for the heating and ventilation system, which is the great feature of the construction.

The heating system differed "from any system in use locally" in that it "does not depend on a small quantity of hot air, but on large volumes of moderately warmed air, and in place of heating the same old vitiated air in the rooms over and over again, simply invites a constant inflow of this fresh air from the outside by just as constantly withdrawing the foul air out of the rooms . . . and avoiding dangerous draughts upon the scholars. . . . Electric indicators lead from each classroom to the basement so that the janitor can be kept informed on the temperature above and regulate the fires accordingly." Seven years later, the school board president deemed the system "reasonably successful only at a heavy expense."

The south end of the school is occupied by four classrooms, 27x34 feet each. Windows are placed in one wall only, thus admitting the light over the left shoulder of the child, and thereby avoiding cross lights so injurious to the eyes. The disposition of the classrooms of the second story is the same as on the first, with the north side utilized by a teacher's lunchroom, a library with connecting toilet, closets and janitor's room. On this story the partitions may be rolled up out of sight, and the four classrooms be transformed into an assembly hall 106 x34 feet in size, with an unobstructed view of the platform.

The cost of the campus was $27,500, "paid for from the rentals of the Lincoln School property on Market and Fifth streets."

===== Overcrowding =====
Dudley Stone School opened with 275 pupils, but within fifteen months there were 465, and many students were seated two at a desk. The Haight-Masonic area "within the past year has been so rapidly built up that the school is already too small." District officials fruitlessly "searched the vicinity for some large vacant house or hall which might be rented for temporary purposes," then in January 1898 decided to add another story to the school. The plans were finally approved more than two years later, and the contract was awarded to the firm of Newsom & McNeil for $7,979.

Dr. C.D. Salfield, a neighborhood activist, announced that he would sue to prevent the construction "on the ground that the addition of another story would be a violation of the building ordinance, and that it was bad policy to compel small children to climb several flights of stairs." The city's governing body, the Board of Supervisors, nevertheless passed a resolution granting a special permit for the "contemplated violation of the city ordinance." But a court found the resolution invalid and issued an injunction against the plan.

So heated did the dispute become that Salfield and former state senator Henry Vinson Morehouse organized a referendum campaign that would have limited the height of all new school buildings. They gathered fifteen thousand signatures.

In 1905 the school board authorized the use of two temporary buildings, called portables, at Dudley Stone School, and by 1912 an addition of four rooms had been made to the building.

In 1915, fire escapes were added, but seven years later an editorial in the San Francisco Chronicle, signed by publisher M.H. de Young, labeled Dudley Stone and a score of other schools "dilapidated and inadequate" and called for passage of a bond issue to improve them.

=== De Avila School ===
==== Pre-immersion ====
By 1980, Dudley Stone School had been renamed the William R. De Avila School, after the school's principal of that name. De Avila had been stricken by multiple sclerosis and used a wheelchair during his last years at the school. "Depressed and in pain, he wrote six notes and took an overdose of sleeping pills," Chronicle columnist Leah Garchick recalled in 2005. "The school name was changed to honor this determined man."

In 1987, the school was purged of asbestos, which had been found in pipe coverings in a hallway near the cafeteria. In 2000 peeling lead paint was found inside the De Avila building.

In 2001, the Charles Schwab Company donated thirty computers to the school. In 2005, the school board voted to close the school because "Enrollment had been declining for years; the students' scores on standardized tests weren't good."

==== Immersion school ====
The school district reopened De Avila in 2009 as a Chinese immersion school because of a surfeit of new kindergarteners in San Francisco. In 2014 it was recognized as a California Distinguished School and Rosina Tong won the mayor's Principal of the Year Award. In 2021, it was recognized as a National Blue Ribbon School.

The first fifth-grade class graduation after the reopening took place in May 2014.
