= Ramsey Kanaan =

Lebanese-Scottish publisher and former singer (born c. 1966)

Ramsey Kanaan is a publisher and distributor of anarchist literature. In 1987, he founded AK Press, first as a distribution entity and later expanded into a small press. In 2007, he founded PM Press, where he remains the publisher.

Kanaan is one of the founders of the Bay Area Anarchist Book Fair and is a member of Bound Together Books in San Francisco, a collectively run anarchist bookstore.

In the 1980s he was the singer of the Scottish anarcho-punk band Political Asylum.

== Early life and career ==
Kanaan was born around 1966. His family was apolitical but encouraged reading. His parents were supportive of Kanaan's early politics; Kanaan's father sewed the patches on his son's jacket before his death when Kanaan was 15. In high school during the late 1970s, he had embraced punk rock and anarchist politics, the former via his younger brother. The punk community was a prominent subculture in his region, and Kanaan was attracted to the politics of its music as well as its anger, its ideas and its melody and harmony. He was particularly drawn to the anti-nuclear movements, and participated in the peace movement, anti-Poll Tax movement, and the Miner's Strike. His closest friends did not share his politics or musical taste.

He entered Do-It-Yourself fanzine culture via his interest in reading and politics. He read books about anarchism via the interlibrary loan system, ordering from the bibliographies of books he received. Kanaan bought his first zine during a 1980 anti-nuclear march in west Scotland. In 1981, he met members of the independent London bookstore Housmans, who mentored him in publishing and distribution. Kanaan began to distribute fanzines with Political Asylum interviews and works co-published with Housmans people. His first catalog, in the early 1980s, had 300 items. He decided to name the distribution entity "AK Press," after his mother, Anne Kanaan.

Kanaan lived in Edinburgh for ten years, grew AK Press, and participated in activism. Friends from the anti-Poll Tax movement approached him about starting a radical bookstore in Edinburgh, which did not materialize but led Kanaan to expand AK Press into a three-person worker co-op. Kanaan tabled for AK Press at punk and folk music shows.

Kanaan was involved in bringing the London anarchist bookfair format to San Francisco, which he said was the first of its kind in North America.

He left AK Press with others in the 2000s to form PM Press, with a focus on a wider variety of literature and propaganda. PM published materials that AK did not, such as fiction, DVDs, and CDs, mainly with the perspective of sharing their politics with a larger audience than nonfiction could reach alone.

== Bibliography ==
- Biel, Joe (2012). "Ramsey Kanaan". Beyond The Music: How Punks are Saving the World with DIY Ethics, Skills, and Values. Portland, Oregon: Cantankerous Titles. pp. 70–77. ISBN 978-1-62106-472-5.
