= Bound Together =

Anarchist bookshop in San Francisco

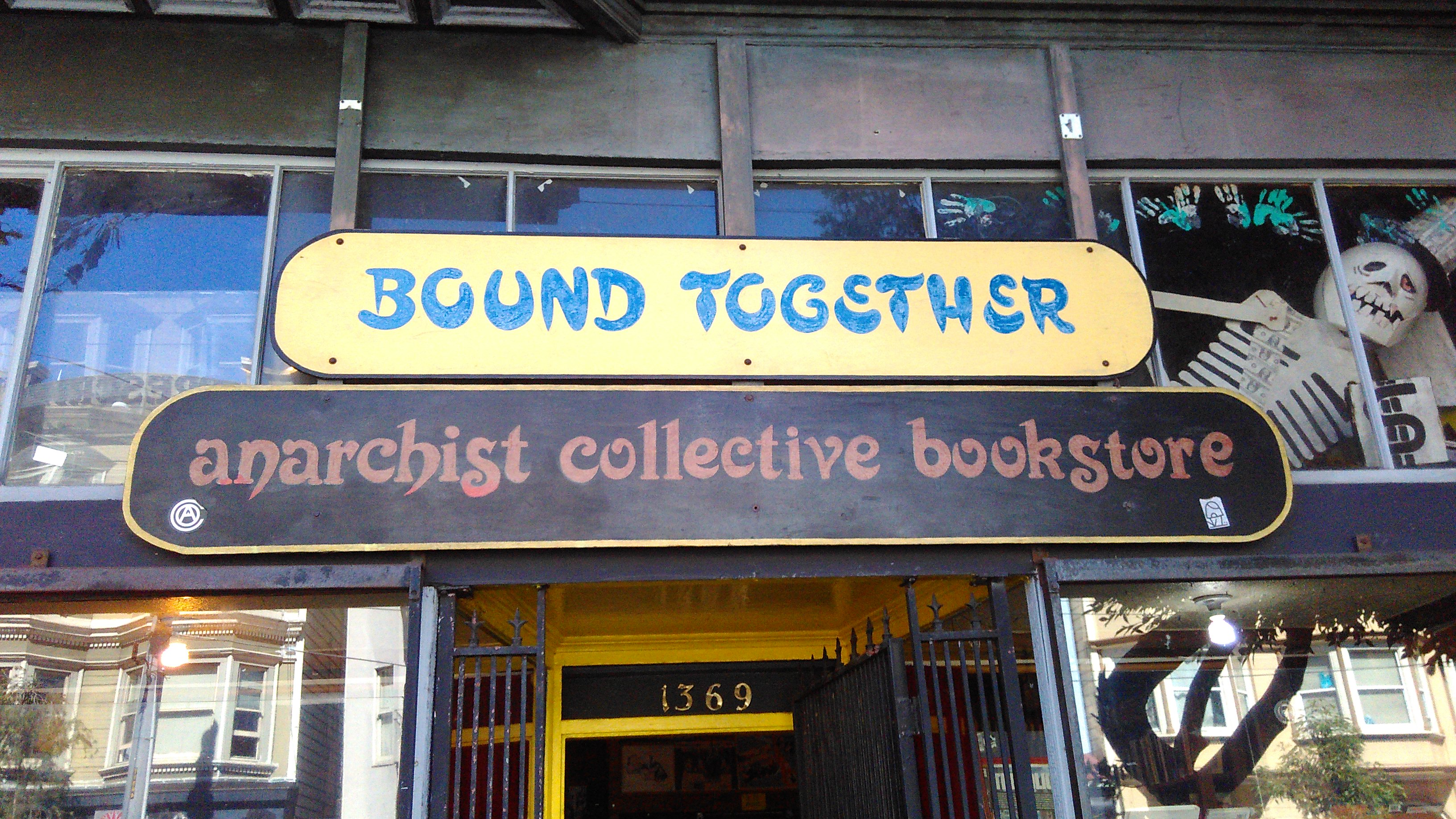
- The storefront, 2017
- Founded: 1976
- Type: Anarchist collective
- Purpose: Anarchist bookstore
- Headquarters: 1369 Haight Street
- Location: San Francisco, United States
- Coordinates: 37.7702°N 122.4447°W
- Region served: San Francisco Bay Area
- Website: boundtogether.org

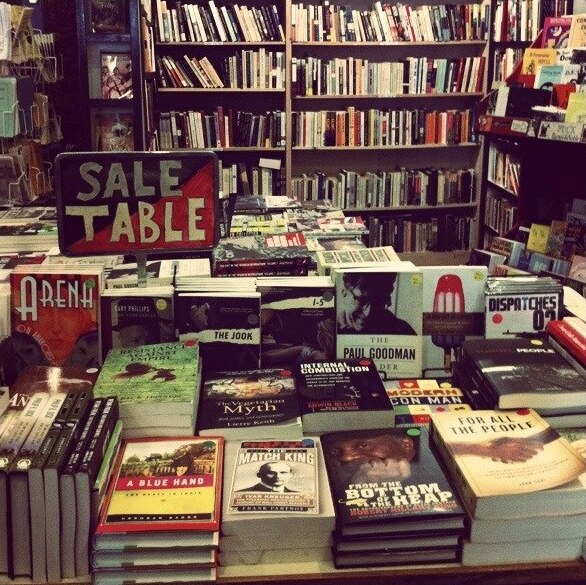
Inside the bookstore, 2011

Bound Together is an anarchist bookstore and visitor attraction on Haight Street in the Haight-Ashbury neighborhood of San Francisco. Its Lonely Planet review in 2016, commenting on its multiple activities, states that it "makes us tools of the state look like slackers". The bookstore carries new and used books as well as local authors.

The bookstore is run by a volunteer collective that includes "lifers" who have held shifts there for decades. Bound Together coordinated the first Bay Area Anarchist Bookfair in 1996, which was to commemorate the 20th anniversary of the bookstore. It sends books to jails through the Prisoners' Literature Project that was founded by the bookstore in the early 1980s. The Prisoners' Literature Project was originally intended to be only for gays in prison. However, as the war on drugs increased, the project evolved to meet the request of anyone incarcerated. A mural outside the bookshop, originally painted in the 1990s by Susan Greene and periodically updated, is titled Anarchists of the Americas and depicts American anarchists including Voltairine de Cleyre, Emma Goldman, and Sacco and Vanzetti, as well as a member's cats. Members of the collective may if they choose put out a chalked sign with a slogan when they are working in the store, and the interior is papered with old posters.

It was founded as "Bound Together Bookstore" in 1976 in a former drugstore at the corner of Hayes and Ashbury Streets by a collective that included Richard Tetenbaum and Ron Wheeler. In 1983 it moved to Haight Street and was renamed "Bound Together: An Anarchist Collective Bookstore". Like other small businesses in San Francisco, the collective has been affected by rising costs: their rent increased twelvefold between 1983 and 2004. Bound Together is among the independent bookstores included on the San Francisco Chronicle's 49-Mile Scenic Route.
