= Booksmith =

Coordinates: 37°46′11″N 122°26′58″W

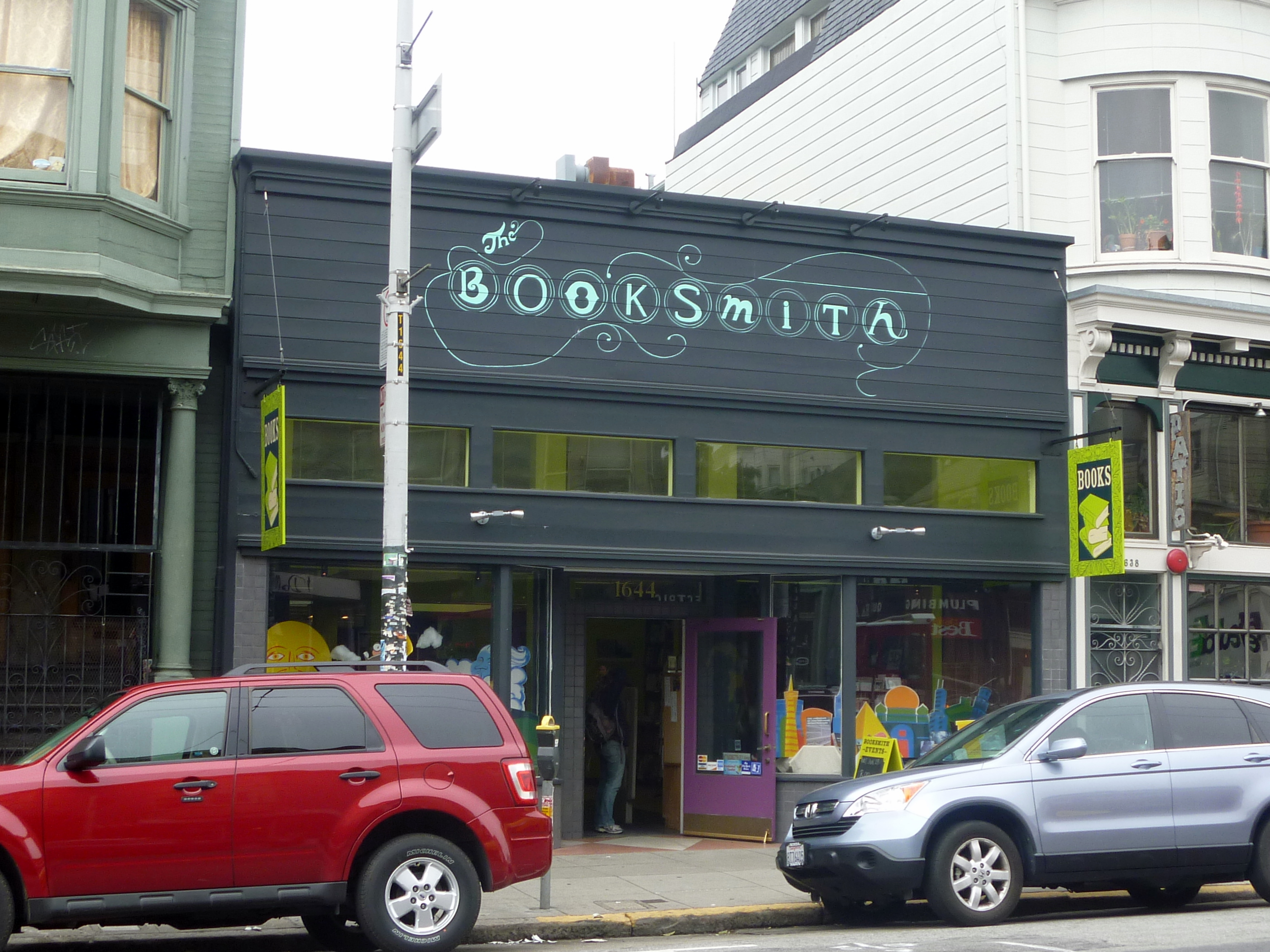
- Industry: Specialty retail
- Founded: October 1976
- Headquarters: San Francisco, United States
- Area served: San Francisco
- Products: New books
- Owners: Christin Evans and Praveen Madan
- Website: www.booksmith.com

The Booksmith is an independent bookstore located in the Haight Ashbury neighborhood of San Francisco. When first opened in October 1976, the store was located at 1746 Haight Street, below the former I-Beam nightclub. In 1985, the store moved to 1644 Haight Street at Belvedere, about a block and a half from the intersection of Haight and Ashbury. In 2021 the store moved down the street to 1727 Haight, the former site of its sister bookstore, the Bindery, now defunct.

The Booksmith caters to neighborhood residents as well as tourists seeking the counter-cultural ambiance of Haight Street. The Booksmith is general interest shop, and is a member of both the Northern California Independent Booksellers Association (NCIBA) and the American Booksellers Association (ABA).

In June 2007, The Booksmith was sold by its founder Gary Frank to married couple Christin Evans and Praveen Madan. The original business was closed, and a new business, Haight Booksmith LLC, opened in its place. According to media reports at the time, the new owners plan to take the store in a different direction.

In May 2011, SF Weekly in its "Best of San Francisco" issue named Booksmith the city's "Best Reimagined Bookstore". Describing the changes to the bookstore, "The new owners gutted the clogged entranceway, feng shui-ed the interior, and gave it a cool Victorian steampunk black-and-teal paint job... with more than 200 in-store author readings a year, Booksmith is more of a literary mecca than ever."

== Authors events ==
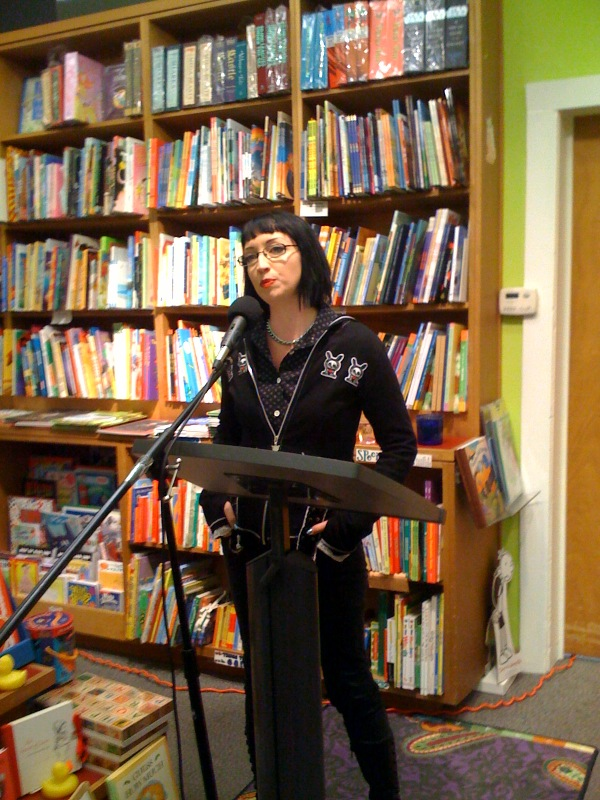
Violet Blue at Booksmith, is reading Mistress Morgana Maye's "Open Letter to the Bush Administration." (The store is SRO)

The store is known for its "ongoing celebrated events program." In the past, the series has featured many authors including novelists, poets, science fiction writers, biographers, historians, cartoonists, Pulitzer Prize, and Booker Prize winners.

Among the celebrated authors who have appeared at past Booksmith events are the Nobel Prize–winning Polish poet Czesław Miłosz, science fiction great Ray Bradbury, gonzo journalist Hunter S. Thompson, children's author Lemony Snicket, rock legends Neil Young and Patti Smith, and photographers Richard Avedon and Annie Leibovitz. Notably, Beat Generation poet Allen Ginsberg gave his last ever reading at The Booksmith, a few months before his death.

Located in the heart of the Haight Ashbury, the store has hosted many individuals associated with the 1960s counter-culture. These include sixties icon Timothy Leary and one-time Digger Peter Coyote. Among the musicians who have appeared at the store are Grateful Dead band members Phil Lesh and Mickey Hart, as well as Grace Slick (Jefferson Airplane), and Ray Manzarek (The Doors). Some of the Beat-related authors who have appeared at the store include Lawrence Ferlinghetti, Michael McClure, and Diane DiPrima.

== Other information ==
Over the years, a number of authors have been employed by The Booksmith, including writer Lewis Buzbee (author of The Yellow-Lighted Bookshop), novelist Kiara Brinkman (author of Up High in the Trees), syndicated cartoonist Tom Tomorrow (author of the This Modern World comic strip), San Francisco Bay Guardian contributing writer Todd Lavoie, short story writer Lisa K. Buchanan, and humorist Paco Romane.

In June 2025, The Booksmith made headlines for ceasing the sale of titles by J. K. Rowling, in response to the previous month's launch of the J.K. Rowling Women's Fund. The Booksmith stated, "When the author of a book states that all sales of those books will contribute to an anti-trans fund, the only way we can choose not to participate is by not selling the books any longer."
