= John Mitchell Watt =

Professor John Mitchell Watt CStJ ED FRSE FRSSAf FRCPE FLS

Professor of Pharmacology and Therapeutics, University College, Johannesburg/University of the Witwatersrand
- In office 1921–?

Personal details
- Born: 1 December 1892 Port Elizabeth, Cape Colony
- Died: 23 April 1980 (aged 87) Brisbane, Queensland, Australia
- Occupation: Physician, pharmacologist

John Mitchell Watt (1 December 1892 – 23 April 1980) was a 20th-century South African physician and pharmacologist.

He served in both World Wars. He made extensive catalogues of traditional African medicines.

== Life ==
He was born in Port Elizabeth in Cape Colony on 1 December 1892. He was educated at the Grey Institute High School in Port Elizabeth. His family moved to Scotland and he completed his education at Stirling High School.

He studied medicine at the University of Edinburgh graduating with an MB ChB in 1916. He then joined the Royal Army Medical Corps.

In 1921 he became Professor of Pharmacology at University College, Johannesburg.

In 1933 he was elected a Fellow of the Royal Society of Edinburgh. His proposers were John Phillips, Robert Burns Young, James Harvey Pirie and Sir William Wright Smith.

In the Second World War he was in charge of medical supplies for the South African Defence Headquarters for the entire war.

In 1957 he joined the South African Institute for Medical Research. In 1965 he moved back to Britain to teach at the Plymouth College of Technology.

He went into semi-retirement in 1965, also moving to Australia. He was a part-time Demonstrator in Physiology at the University of Queensland. Rand Afrikaans University awarded him an honorary doctorate (LLD) for his academic writing in 1972.

He died in Brisbane on 23 April 1980.

== Family ==
He was married twice: firstly in 1920 to Yelena Nikonova, secondly in 1942 to Betty Gwendoline Lory.

== Publications ==
- Basuto Medicines (1927)
- Salanocapsine (1932) with H L Heimann
- The Medicinal and Poisonous Plants of Southern and Eastern Africa (1932, revised 1962)
- Practical Notes on Pharmacology (1940)
