= Kiara Brinkman =

American writer

- Born: November 29, 1979 (age 46); Omaha, Nebraska, U.S.
- Education: Brown University; Goddard College (MFA)
- Occupation: Writer
- Website: seanandkiara.com/kiara-brinkman/

Kiara Brinkman (born November 29, 1979) is an American writer born in Omaha, Nebraska now living in San Francisco, California. Her 2007 novel, Up High in the Trees, was published by Grove Press and was widely reviewed. Brinkman has also authored several short stories. Her work has appeared in One Story, Pinelboyz, Failbetter and elsewhere. Her contribution to McSweeney’s, "Counting Underwater," was named one of the 100 Other Distinguished Stories of 2005 in The Best American Short Stories 2006.

== Biography ==
Brinkman graduated from Brown University and earned an MFA from Goddard College. Recently, Brinkman has worked with children as a teacher and tutor, and has led workshops at Mills College and 826 Valencia (a youth arts center in San Francisco). Brinkman is currently employed part-time at the Booksmith, an independent bookstore located in San Francisco.

Upon its release in 2007, Up High in the Trees earned positive reviews in the Washington Post, San Francisco Chronicle, Los Angeles Times, and Chicago Tribune (where it was named one of the newspaper’s "Favorite Books of 2007"). Writing in the New York Times, novelist Madison Smartt Bell noted, "Like Faulkner’s Benjy from The Sound and the Fury, Sebastian is most unusual for the lyrical intensity of his inner life, and the strongest impression this fine debut leaves is his nicely achieved voice, which is moving without being precious." The book also received praise from writers Cristina García, Maud Casey, and Dave Eggers.

Up High in the Trees was released in softcover in the summer of 2008. In 2021, Brinkman will publish a graphic novel, Lucy in the Sky, illustrated by her husband, Sean Chiki.
