= Torbrex Village =

Coordinates: 56.106789°N 3.952350°W

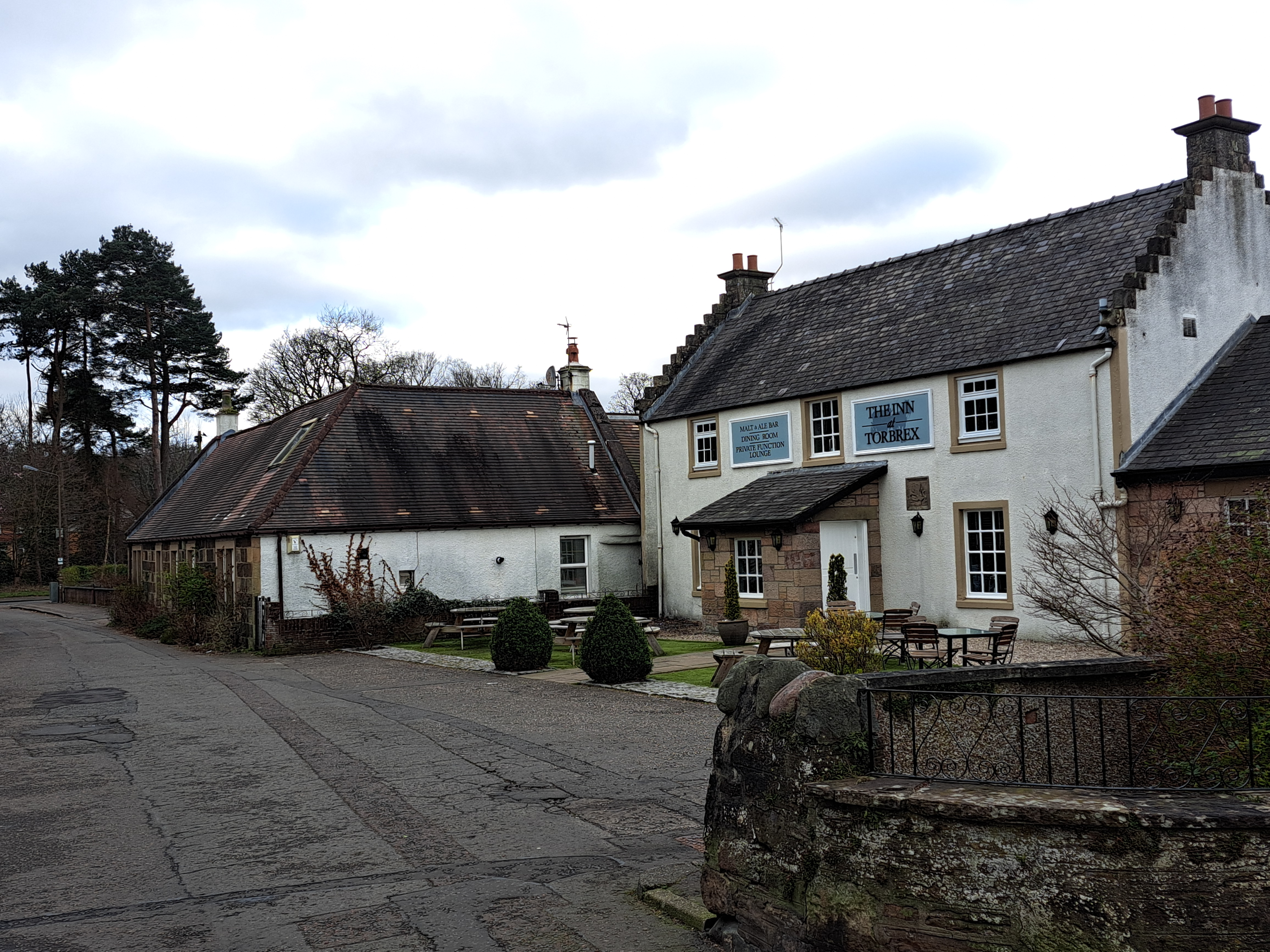
Torbrex Inn and neighbouring cottage

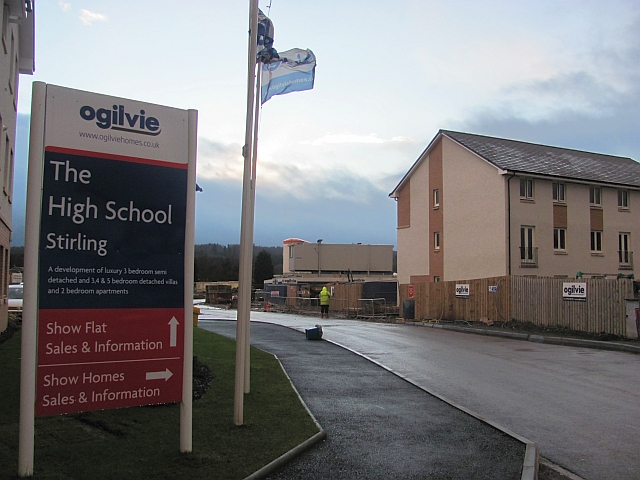
Former site of Stirling High School

Torbrex (Scottish Gaelic: An Torr Breac) is an area in the southwest of Stirling, Scotland, which developed around a small weaving village. It is neighboured by Cambusbarron to the west, St. Ninians to the south, Livilands to the east and Kenningknowes and Laurelhill to the north.

The village lay along a single street which contains a number of old buildings, including the Torbrex Inn which dates back to 1726, having been built as Torbrex House in 1721 by John Wordie. On the Timothy Pont map of around 1600 the village is spelt "Torbrecks" and on William Roy's 18th century map "Torbreaks".

The Wordie family had a significant influence on this area, building Williamsfield House in 1682 which still stands near the current site of St Ninians Primary School and Torbrex House in 1721. Thomas Wordie established a carrier business in Stirling in 1745 which grew to operate across Scotland in collaboration with the railways, delivering goods from rail stations to their final destinations.

On the south side of Torbrex Road a later substantial Torbrex House with grounds was constructed in 1883 for Sheriff James Buntine (1841-1920), who lived there with his wife until his death. His widow continued to live there until at least 1932, and died in 1938. The house was subsequently converted to flats by Stirling Burgh Council but was badly damaged by fire in 1964. It was subsequently demolished and the site redeveloped as part of new housing at Coxet Hill - only a small part of the northern boundary wall remains.

New areas of housing in Stirling were developed to the north and south of the village from the 1950s onwards, including Torbrex Farm, and the wider area is referred to as Torbrex. Torbrex Community Council covers an area bounded in the west by Polmaise Road and in the south by Torbrex Road.

Stirling County Cricket Club was based at Williamfield in Torbrex for 130 years, from 1877 to 2007, when it relocated to a new site on the eastern outskirts of Stirling. Adjacent to the cricket club, Stirling Ice Rink opened at Williamfield on 29 September 1980 and was demolished following the opening of a new rink at The Peak, on the eastern edge of Stirling, in 2009.

Stirling High School has been situated in Torbrex since 1962. In 2008 it relocated to the site vacated by the cricket club, and its previous site immediately to the north has been developed as housing.

The oldest bones of a human from the Stirling area have been named "Torbrex Tam" by archaeologists and were found nearby in Coneypark in 2017. It is believed he died around 2152 to 2021 BC, meaning the bones are more than 4000 years old.
