= The Red Victorian =

Coordinates: 37.769489°N 122.450218°W

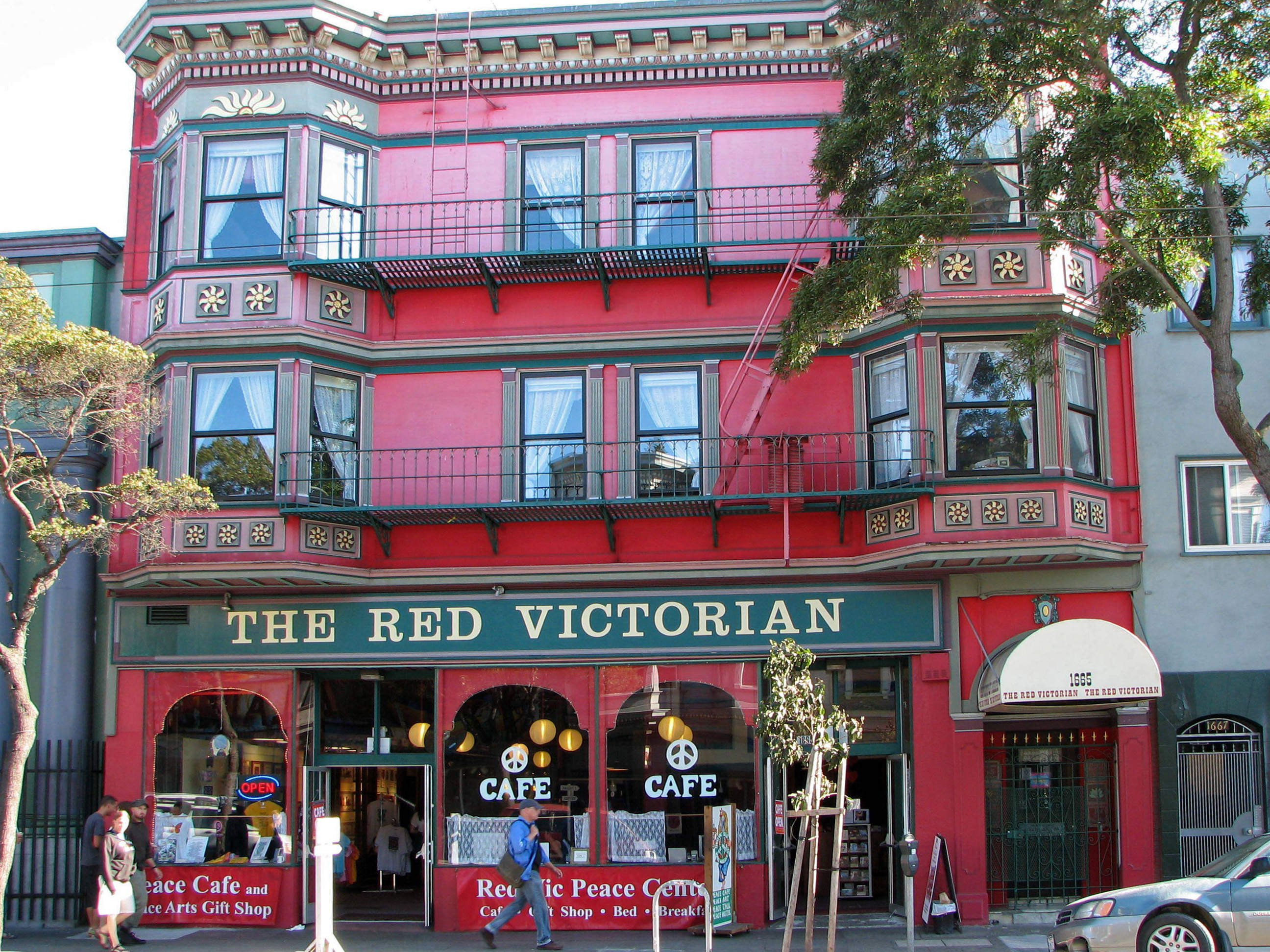
- The Red Victorian in 2008
- Interactive map of The Red Victorian
- Former names: Jefferson Hotel, Jeffrey Haight

General information
- Type: Hotel
- Location: 1665 Haight St, San Francisco, CA 94117

Technical details
- Floor count: 3

Website
- http://www.redvic.com/

The Red Victorian is a historic hotel on Haight Street in San Francisco's Haight-Ashbury district, two blocks from Golden Gate Park.

== History ==
=== Jefferson Hotel and Jeffrey Haight ===
The hotel was built in 1904 as the Jefferson Hotel. In the Summer of Love in 1967, it became the Jeffrey Haight, a free "crash pad".

=== Red Victorian Bed, Breakfast & Art and Peace Center ===
In 1977, environmental artist and social activist Sami Sunchild acquired the building, painted the facade red, and named it the "Red Victorian Bed, Breakfast, & Art". She decorated the hotel with psychedelic art and gave the 17 guest rooms themes such as the "Flower Child" room, the "Rainbow" room, the "Cat's Cradle" room (with cat), the "Redwoods" room, and the "Peacock suite". Goldfish swam in the toilet tank in the Aquarium Bathroom. The Peace cafe and Peace Arts gift shop were on the ground floor; next door was the Global Village Center, a bazaar and coffeehouse. In 1992, Sunchild told an interviewer that the hotel was "about upgrading our consciousness"; in 2007 she described it as a "global hotel" where guests could "meet, get involved with other travelers and have great conversations on world peace". She established the Peaceful World Center at the Red Victorian and in the 1990s began hosting Sunday morning World Peace Conversations there, which became an international network.

=== Red Victorian cooperative ===
Sunchild died at the age of 87 in July 2013. The following year, Jessy Kate Schingler, founder of Open Door Development LLC and The Embassy Network, established the Red Victorian, LLC as a subsidiary of District Commons. On July 1, 2014, District Commons took over management of the Red Victorian under lease from the Peaceful World Foundation non-profit established by Sunchild The hotel was affiliated with The Embassy Network as a 20-room co-living house with community spaces on the ground floor, which hosted art shows, lectures, and parties. It later operated as an Airbnb. They were also part of the Haight Street Commons network.

The closure of hotels and ban on public events instituted in spring 2020 during the COVID-19 pandemic made it challenging for The Red Victorian to continue the hotel or other activities. District Commons announced on the Red Victorian Facebook page that the hotel's lease would be terminated early at the end of September. In August, Fishbowl Drag performances began in the hotel's front window, and the Fishbowl SF collective launched a fundraiser in order to lease the building as housing for queer, transgender, and gender-nonconforming people and people of color. During this time, a dispute between District Commons and other individuals, including those performing with Fishbowl, arose around residential tenancy in the building. District Commons said that the group did not have permission to live in the hotel and in October said that it had filed a forcible detainer to require them to leave.

The parties reached settlement in June 2021 and all tenants and occupants left the building by the end of 2021.

=== Current Ownership ===
The building was sold in September 2022. No business has yet re-opened at the hotel. The glass storefront is obscured and heavily graffitied. Permits show significant interior renovations are underway.

== Red Vic Movie House ==
The Red Vic independent movie theater, operated by a collective, opened in July 1980 in rented space in the Red Victorian and later moved to a separate building on Haight Street. In the 1980s, it began annual screenings of "The Hippie Temptation", Harry Reasoner's shocked coverage of the Summer of Love on the first broadcast of the CBS series Who, What, Where, When, Why in August 1967. It closed in 2011.

== Banksy mural ==
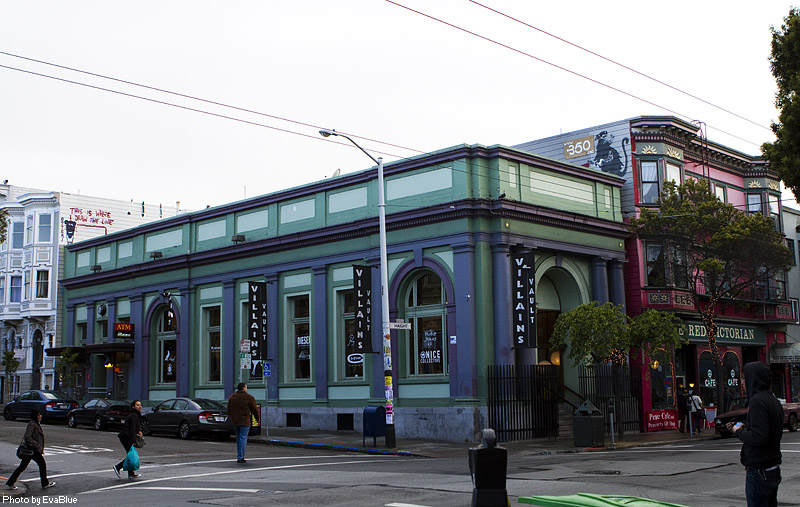
The Red Victorian can be seen on the far-right of this image taken in 2010, with Banksy's work adjacent.

The Red Victorian was one of the sites decorated with street art by Banksy during a visit to San Francisco in April 2010: from an adjacent roof, he spray-painted a rat clutching a marker pen on the side of the building, and the slogan "THIS IS WHERE I DRAW THE LINE" nearby. After a fundraising campaign, the pieces of siding were removed in December and stabilized so that the Haight Street Rat could be displayed, and it toured art galleries as part of an exhibition of Banksy's work. The same image reappeared in 2017.
