= PM Press =

American anarchist book publisher

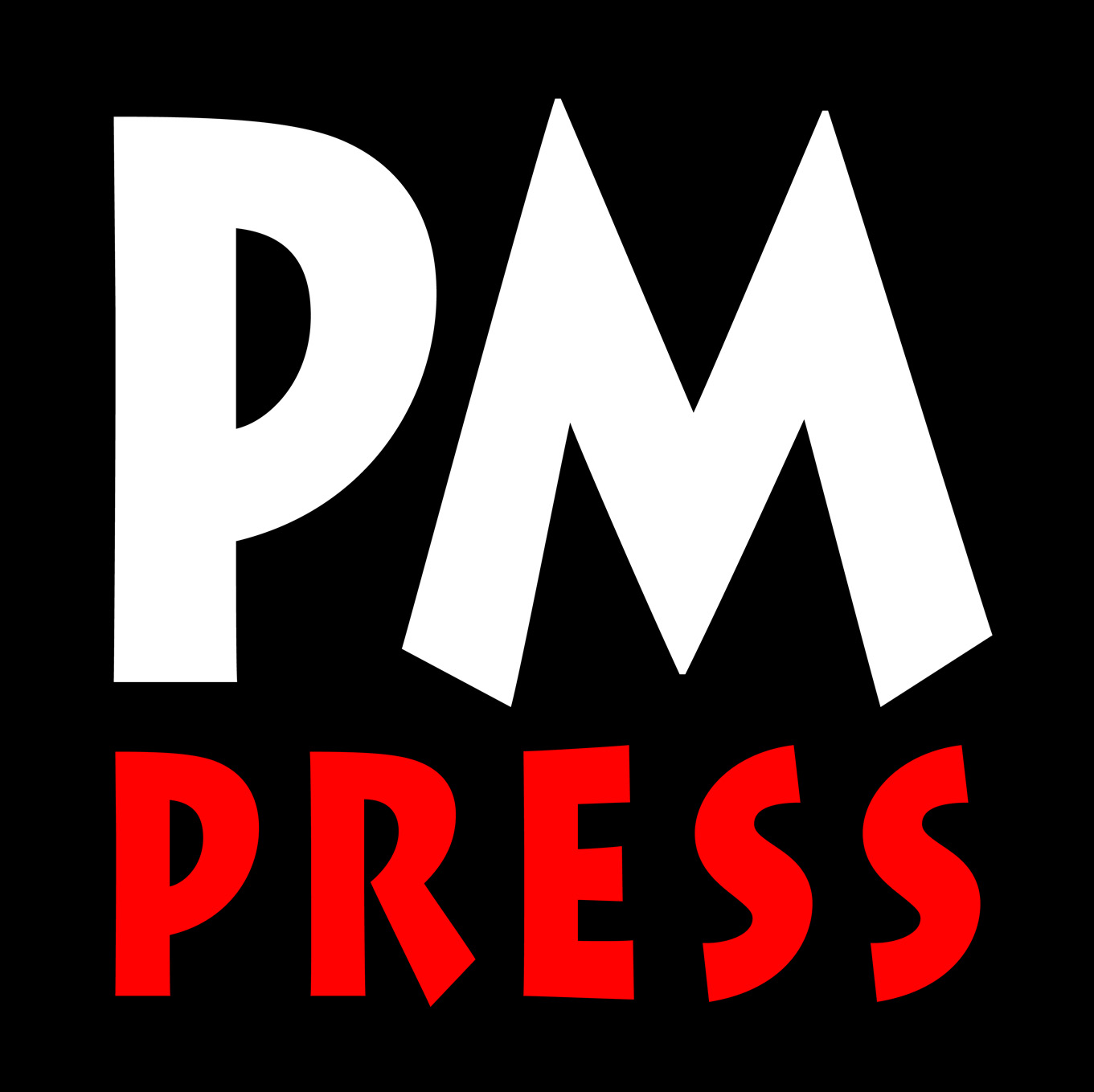
- Founded: 2007; 19 years ago
- Founder: Ramsey Kanaan, Craig O'Hara
- Country of origin: United States
- Headquarters location: Ithaca, New York
- Distribution: Independent Publishers Group (US); Turnaround Publisher Services (UK)
- Publication types: Books
- Official website: pmpress.org

PM Press is an American independent publisher, founded in 2007 by Ramsey Kanaan, Craig O'Hara, and others as a vehicle for selling radical literature. The initial PM Press crew had been working at AK Press, another radical publisher that Kanaan founded, but they wanted to sell works that were not strictly from an anarchist perspective and to explore new media offerings. To that end, PM Press prioritizes works by radical authors, artists, and activists on a wide variety of topics including race, economics, and gender.

Previously based in the San Francisco Bay Area, the press relocated its headquarters to Binghamton, New York in 2022. PM Press acquired Autumn Leaves, a physical used bookstore in Ithaca, New York, in 2023. By 2025, their headquarters was also in Ithaca. PM Press also has a United Kingdom branch based in Sunderland.

== History ==
PM Press was founded in Oakland, California by Ramsey Kanaan and Craig O'Hara in 2007. Kanaan had previously founded AK Press, and O'Hara had worked there with him. It was named "PM" in reference to the fact that the press's staff would work on it at night as a second job. Whereas AK was exclusively for printed anarchist literature, PM Press was intended to cover radical topics more broadly and to expand beyond print by introducing ebook formats and exploring new media. Some items, such as zines, were available only as ebooks. Kanaan had tried to introduce these ideas to AK Press for some years before starting PM Press, but he was unable to get a majority to align with him within AK Press's democratic processes. So, Kanaan and some others decided to leave AK and start a different venture. Initially, the staff was all-volunteer.

Within three years, the publisher's catalogue included more than 100 items, and some staff members were paid. Their strategy was to sell items with print runs of around 1,000 to 3,000 copies, each title sourced from an open submission process. Many of those sales were directly to people at gatherings, and PM attended several hundred of those sorts of events each year. PM Press also sold to small, often left-leaning bookstores. Sometimes, PM established imprints with stores, as it did with Busboys and Poets. Two-thirds of the press's unit sales and 40% of its income came from Independent Publishers Group. At that time, PM Press still warehoused its books in the apartment of its shipper, Dan Federenko.

In 2013, PM Press began Paperbacks Plus, a program that bundled a free ebook with a purchase of a paperback. It was the first publisher to offer that sort of bundle for most of its print books. Around this time, PM Press hired its first employee who did not start off at the company as a volunteer.

In 2017, PM Press moved into a 3,000-square-foot warehouse in Oakland that they rented. Before that, the press was headquartered out of Kanaan's apartment and Federenko's garden shed. However, the space presented problems because the high cost-of-living made it difficult for its employees to live there. When the COVID-19 pandemic hit in 2020, PM Press survived the crisis with Paycheck Protection Program loans and a tripling of subscribers to its mail-order program called Friends of PM. The rise in political consciousness following the George Floyd protests of 2020 "saved publishing", according to Kanaan.

During the pandemic, PM Press joined as a founding member of the Radical Publishers' Alliance, a group of politically oriented book publishers and magazines around the world. The group was intended to support independent radical publishing during the COVID-19 pandemic. They held virtual meetings over Zoom to discuss adaptations to the turbulent economic conditions of that period. One of the group's initiatives was #RadicalMay, a virtual book fair that 50 publishers (including PM Press) took part in.

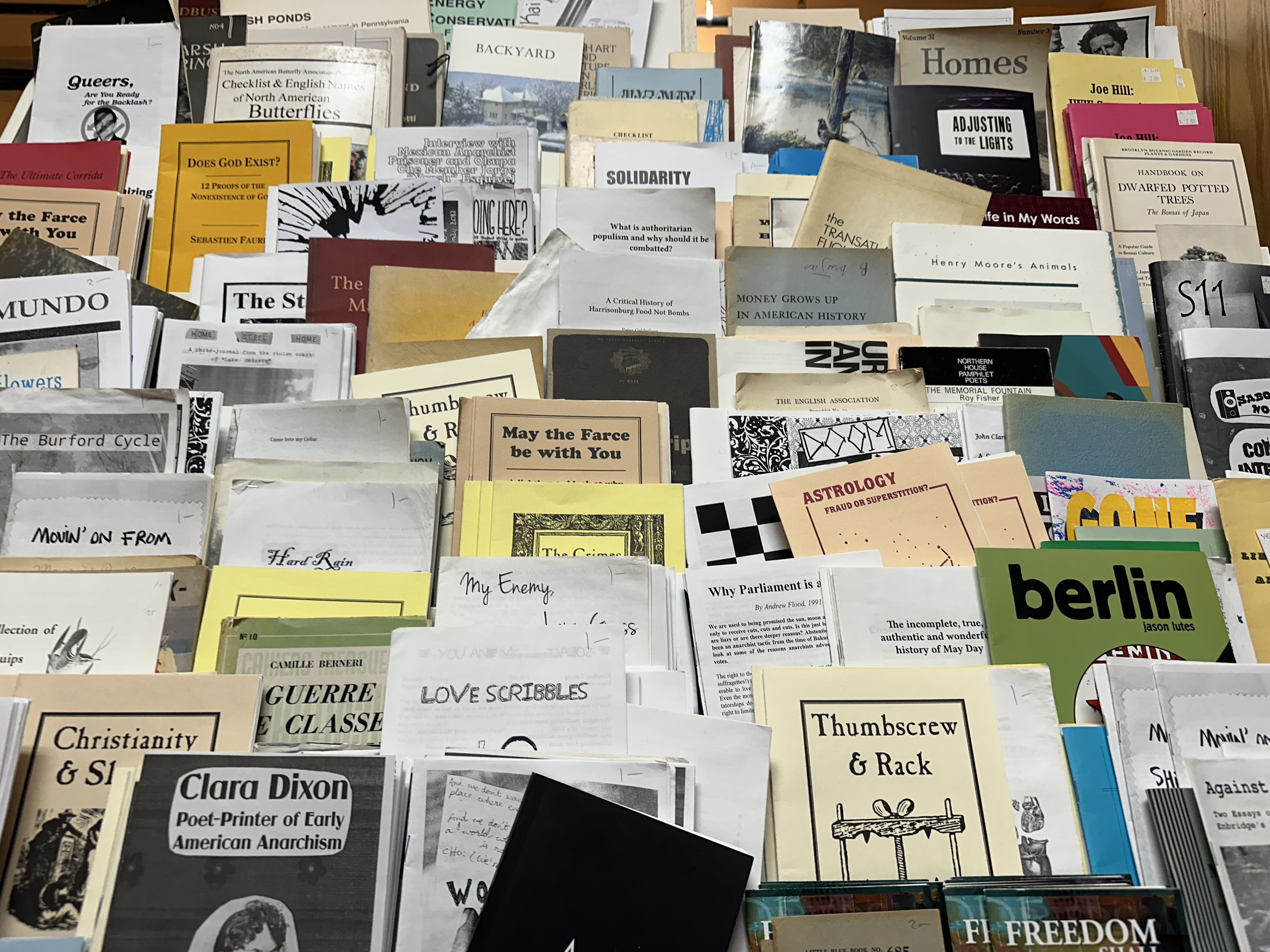
Zines and small publications available at Autumn Leaves, 2025

By 2022, PM Press was profitable on paper for the first time, and it secured a mortgage from a bank to purchase a new headquarters in Binghamton, New York. The 17,000-square-foot Binghamton facility included two warehouse spaces, loading docks, and a parking lot that the company intended to host events within. At the time, PM Press had 13 employees and revenue of around $1.5 million, supporting a catalog of 600 books with around 40 new titles each year. The press continued to operate the rented facility in Oakland.

In 2023, PM Press purchased Autumn Leaves, a small independent bookstore in Ithaca, New York, after the retirement of its original owner, Joseph Wetmore. At the time, Autumn Leaves was the last used bookstore in the area and had been in operation for 30 years. PM Press expanded the new books available at Autumn Leaves and its scholarly works, including many of the publisher's offerings.

In 2025, PM Press acquired Just World Books, an independent press focused on war and peace issues, particularly in the Middle East. Just World Books was founded by longtime global-affairs writer and researcher Helena Cobban in 2010, who ran the publisher by herself before selling to PM. With the acquisition, Just World Books moved its headquarters to join PM Press, which was then headquartered in Ithaca, New York.

PM Press was an early adopter of Briet, a service that sells perpetual ebook licenses to libraries.
