= Anarchist bookfair =

Exhibition for anti-authoritarian literature and anarchist cultural events

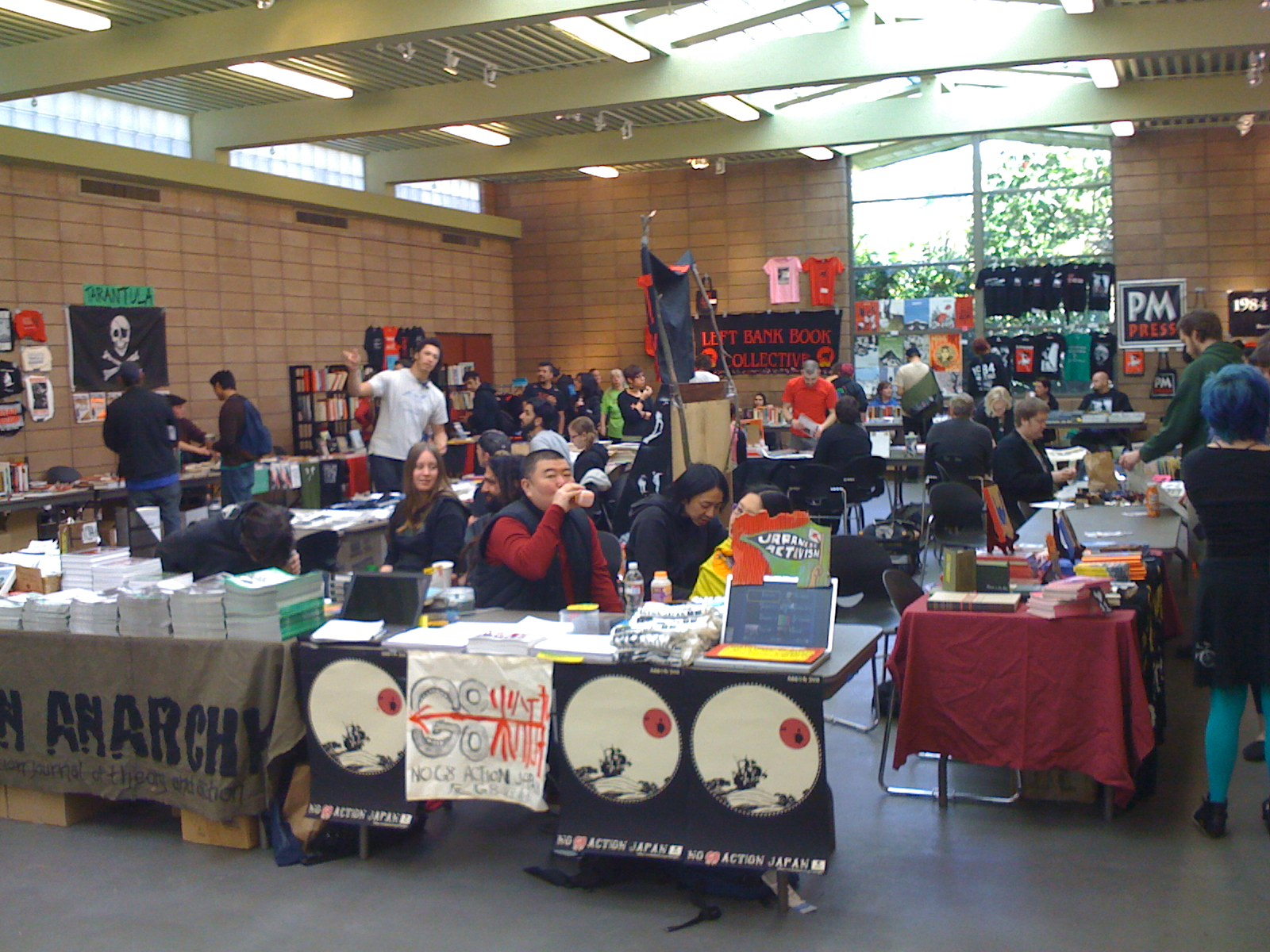
Bay Area Anarchist Bookfair, 2008

An anarchist bookfair is an exhibition for anti-authoritarian literature often combined with anarchist social and cultural events. They have existed since at least 1983, beginning in London, and are held either annually or sporadically. Some have speakers or other events related to anarchist culture.

== Overview ==
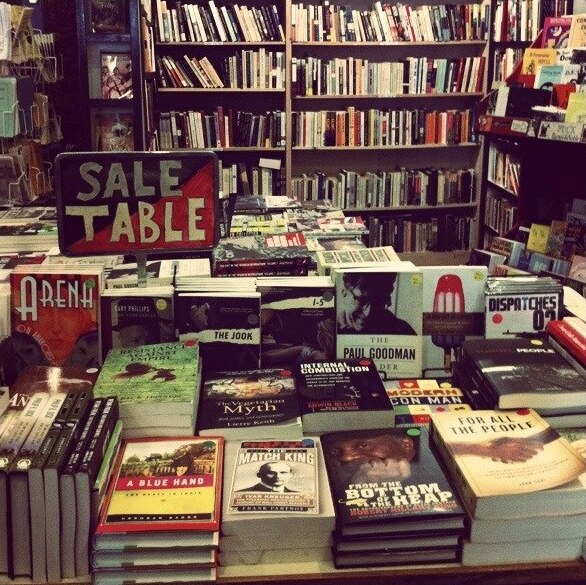
Anarchist books

Anarchist bookfairs have existed since at least 1983. They are community-organized, held either annually or sporadically, and usually last between a day and a weekend. At these fairs, anarchist publishers sell literature from booths to an internal audience of other anarchists. They are also social events, as the distribution of publications brings those sympathetic to anarchism together to exchange ideas and organize according to their shared interest. Bookfairs are not intended to replace external political activism or fight capitalism, but serve as a space for anarchist activists to build networks and experience social togetherness.

== Selected fairs ==
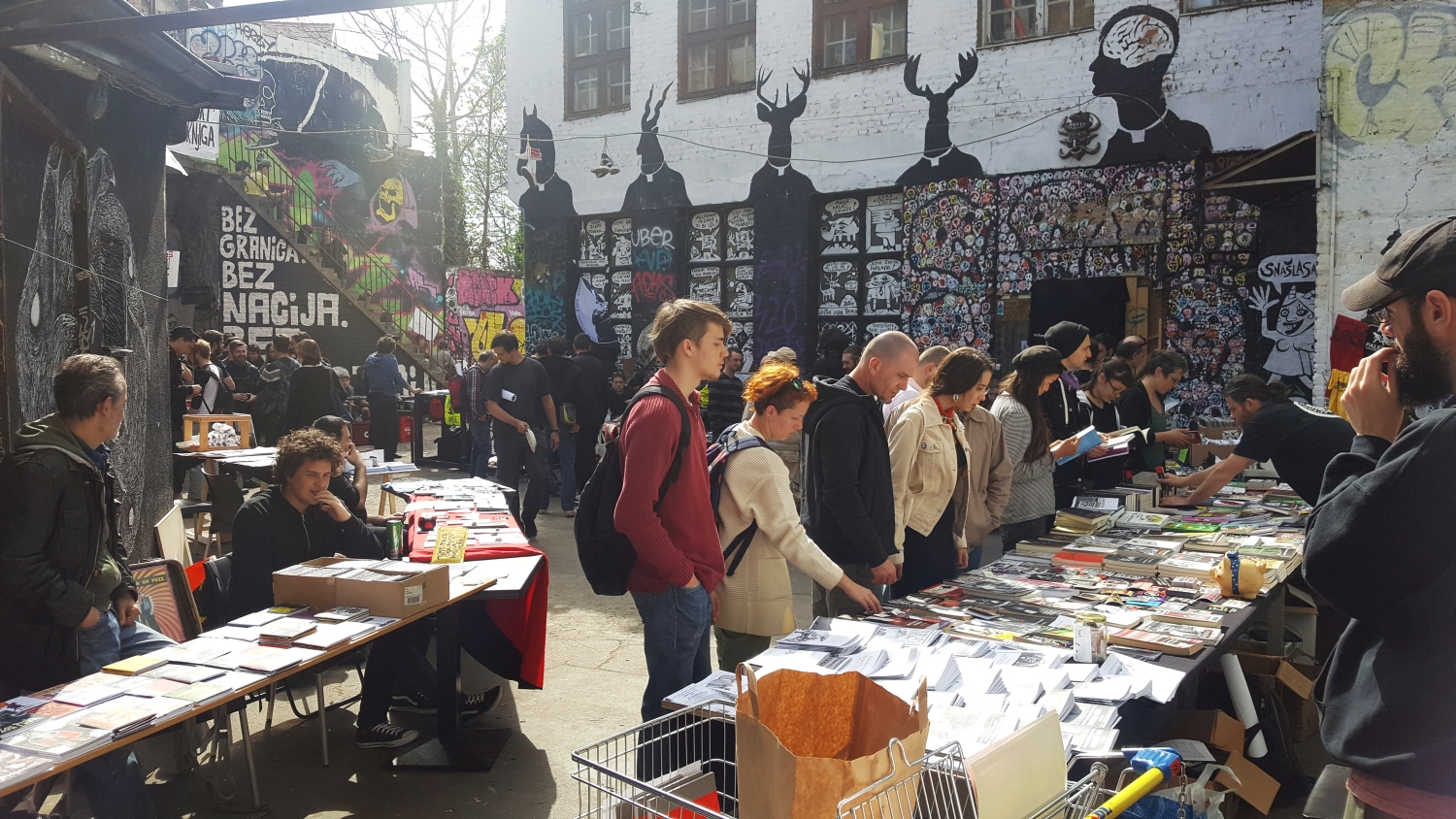
Anarchist book fair in Zagreb

=== United Kingdom ===
London has hosted annual anarchist bookfairs since 1983, first in Conway Hall and later in Park View School. Other British locales including Bradford, Bristol, Cardiff, Glasgow, and Manchester have hosted anarchist book fairs.

=== United States ===
The annual Bay Area Anarchist Bookfair began in 1995. Held in Golden Gate Park and organized by Bound Together bookshop, the fair includes West Coast alternative publishers and organizations such as Food Not Bombs. Speakers have included Lawrence Ferlinghetti, Carol Queen, artist Eric Drooker, activist Roxanne Dunbar-Ortiz, and publisher Bruce Anderson. The 2005 event had 75 vendors including AK Press, who had the largest booth. Los Angeles also hosts an anarchist bookfair.

Elsewhere in the United States, the annual New York Anarchist Book Fair has run since the mid-2000s in Judson Memorial Church on Washington Square Park. It has included workshops on topics such as food sovereignty and medicinal plants. The Boston Anarchist Bookfair influenced the Scranton Radical Book Fair in Scranton, Pennsylvania, which ran at least three years and included a Really Really Free Market.

=== Canada ===
The Montreal Anarchist Book Fair (French: Salon du livre anarchiste de Montréal) has occurred annually since at least 2009. It attracts anti-capitalists and activists including anarchoprimitivists, Marxists, queer groups, and skinheads. An article in Lien social et Politiques called the Montreal Anarchist Book Fair and Festival of Anarchy together the largest annual gathering of its kind in North America. The fair inspired Expozine, a small press, zine, and comics fair in Montreal, which began in 2002. Victoria, British Columbia, also hosts an anarchist bookfair.
