= Stanyan Street =

Street in San Francisco

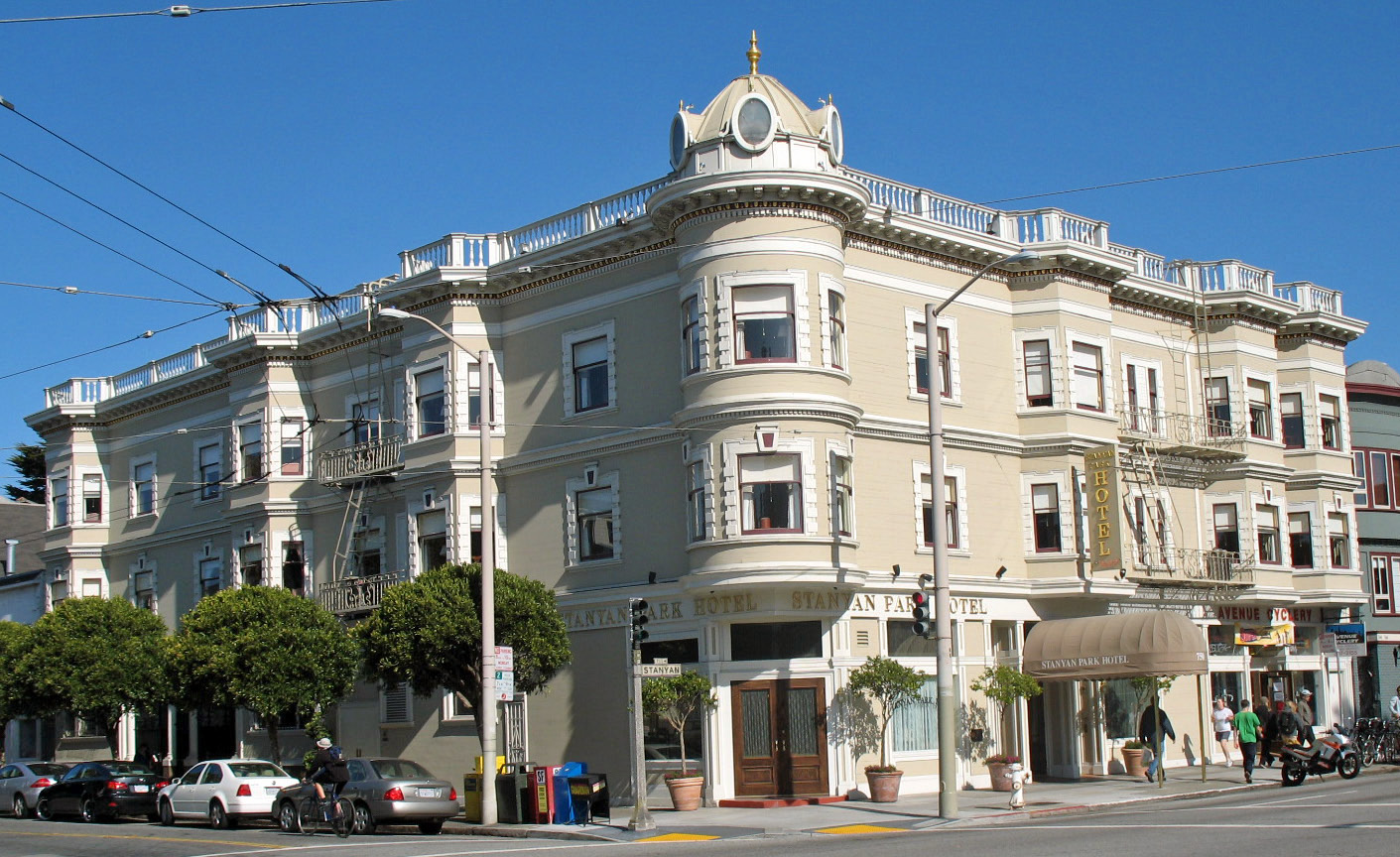
- Stanyan Park Hotel is a historic building at the corner of Stanyan Street and Waller Street.
- Owner: City and County of San Francisco
- Maintained by: San Francisco DPW
- Location: San Francisco, California
- North end: Geary Boulevard
- South end: Belgrave Avenue

Stanyan Street is a north–south street in San Francisco, California marking the eastern side of the Golden Gate Park and the western side of the Panhandle. It is named after Charles H. Stanyan, a city supervisor from 1866 to 1869 who was on the committee which sited the park.

The street is celebrated in one of Rod McKuen's poem collections Stanyan Street & Other Sorrows (1966), and in Nick Waterhouse's song "Stanyan Street", from his 2016 release Never Twice.
