= AK Press =

American anarchist book publisher

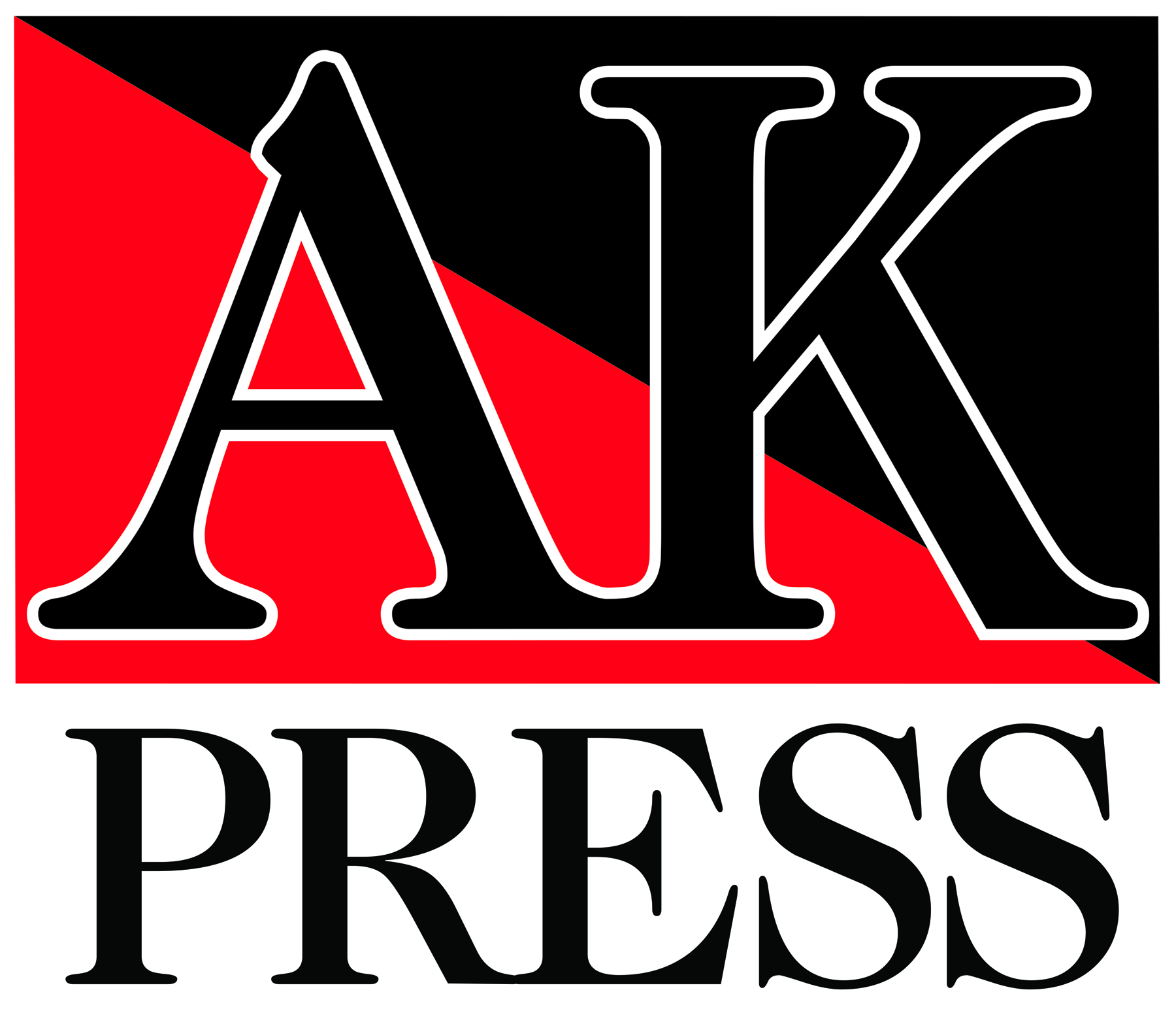
- Founded: 1987; 39 years ago
- Founder: Ramsey Kanaan
- Country of origin: United States
- Headquarters location: Chico, California
- Distribution: Consortium Book Sales & Distribution (US); Turnaround Publisher Services (UK)
- Publication types: Books
- Nonfiction topics: Radical left and anarchist literature
- Official website: www.akpress.org and www.akuk.com

AK Press is a worker-managed, independent publisher and book distributor that specializes in publishing books about anarchism and the radical left. Operated out of Chico, California, United States, with a branch in Edinburgh, Scotland, the company is collectively owned.

== History ==
AK was founded in Stirling, Scotland, by Ramsey Kanaan in 1987 as a small mail-order distribution outlet, eventually expanding into independent publishing and moving the Scotland base of operations to Edinburgh, Scotland, and later opening a US base of operations in Oakland, California. The press was named for Kanaan's mother, Ann Kanaan. Kanaan and several other members of AK Press left in 2007 to form PM Press.

After operating out of the Bay Area for decades, in March 2015, a deadly fire at a warehouse complex in West Oakland, California, damaged AK Press's warehouse and prompted the press to relocate to their present base in Chico.

In 2020, AK Press joined as a founding member of the Radical Publishers' Alliance, a group of politically oriented book publishers and magazines around the world.

== Operations ==
AK Press is organized as a collective, akin to a workers' co-operative. The press is owned by all members of the collective, works without bosses or hierarchy, and uses collective decision-making processes, following anarchist principles.

Works published by AK Press include classic anarchist texts by Peter Kropotkin, Pierre-Joseph Proudhon, Errico Malatesta, Emma Goldman, Alexander Berkman, and Voltairine de Cleyre, as well books on the history of anarchism and of anarchist struggles like the Spanish Revolution, Nestor Makhno and the Makhnovshchina. They also publish on topics related to ongoing anti-fascism and contemporary anarchism, such as prison abolition, the environmental movement, anti-capitalism, feminism, and anti-racism.

AK Press regularly publishes in collaboration with the Institute for Anarchist Studies, the Kate Sharpley Library, and World War 3 Illustrated. They also publish the Emergent Strategy Series, edited by adrienne maree brown and inspired by her book of the same name, including books by queer Black feminists Alexis Pauline Gumbs and Alexis de Veaux. Their Black Dawn series is noted for releasing speculative fiction with anarchist and political themes, including books by Margaret Killjoy and adrienne maree brown, among others.

In both the US and UK, the business tables at anarchist bookfairs, conferences, activist gatherings, and literary festivals. The company also sells clothing, buttons, stickers, and various other related items.

== See also ==
- AK Press books
- Anarchism and the arts
- List of book distributors
- List of English-language small presses
- List of books about anarchism
