= Haight-Ashbury =

- Neighborhood
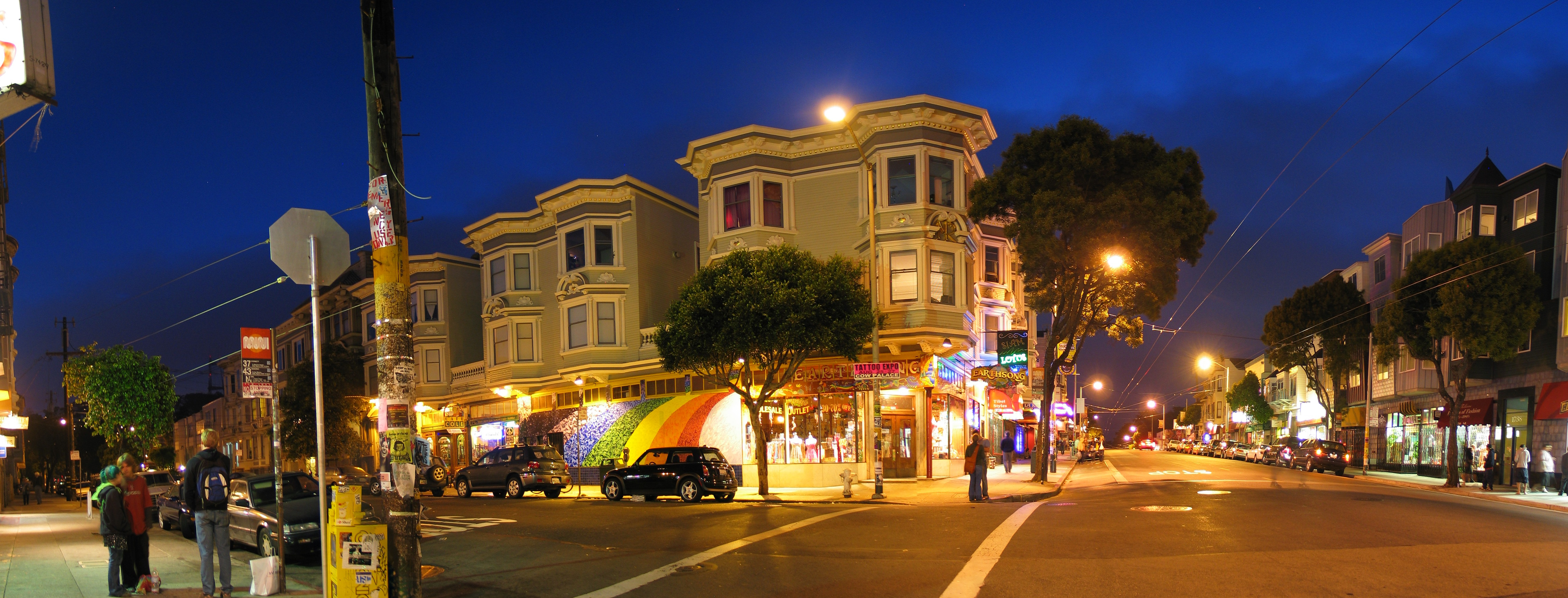
- Cole Street, left, and Haight Street, right
- Nicknames: The Haight, Upper Haight, Hashbury, Psychedelphia
- Location within Central San Francisco
- Coordinates: 37.7700°N 122.4469°W
- Country: United States
- State: California
- City and county: San Francisco

Government
  - Supervisor: Bilal Mahmood
  - Assemblymember: Matt Haney (D)
  - State senator: Scott Wiener (D)
  - U. S. rep.: Nancy Pelosi (D)

Area
  - Total: 0.309 sq mi (0.80 km^{2})
  - Land: 0.309 sq mi (0.80 km^{2})

Population
  - Total: 10,601
  - Density: 34,253/sq mi (13,225/km^{2})
- Time zone: UTC−8 (Pacific)
  - Summer (DST): UTC−7 (PDT)
- ZIP Code: 94117
- Area codes: 415/628

Haight-Ashbury (/ˌheɪt ˈæʃbɛri, -bəri/) is a district of San Francisco, California, named for the intersection of Haight and Ashbury streets. It is also called the Haight and the Upper Haight. The neighborhood is known as one of the main centers of the counterculture of the 1960s.

== Location ==
The district generally encompasses the neighborhood surrounding Haight Street, bounded by Stanyan Street and Golden Gate Park on the west, Oak Street and the Golden Gate Park Panhandle on the north, Baker Street and Buena Vista Park to the east, and Frederick Street and the Ashbury Heights and Cole Valley neighborhoods to the south.

The street names commemorate two early San Francisco leaders: pioneer and exchange banker Henry Haight, and Munroe Ashbury, a member of the San Francisco Board of Supervisors from 1864 to 1870.

Both Haight and his nephew, as well as Ashbury, had a hand in the planning of the neighborhood and nearby Golden Gate Park at its inception. The name "Upper Haight" is also used by locals in contrast to the Haight-Fillmore, or Lower Haight.

The Beats had congregated around San Francisco's North Beach neighborhood from the late 1950s. Many who could not find accommodation there turned to the quaint, relatively cheap and underpopulated Haight-Ashbury.

Haight-Ashbury would later become notable for its role as one of the main centers of the hippie movement. The Summer of Love (1967) and much of the counterculture of the 1960s have been synonymous with San Francisco and the Haight-Ashbury neighborhood ever since.

== History ==
=== Gold Rush era and early urbanization ===
The discovery of gold in 1848 and the subsequent California Gold Rush saw a rapid increase in population and urbanization in San Francisco. Before the completion of the Haight Street Cable Railroad in 1883, what is now the Haight-Ashbury was a collection of isolated farms and acres of sand dunes. The Haight cable car line, completed in 1883, connected the east end of Golden Gate Park with the geographically central Market Street line and the rest of downtown San Francisco. As the primary gateway to Golden Gate Park, and with an amusement park known as the Chutes on Haight Street between Cole and Clayton Streets between 1895 and 1902 and the California League Baseball Grounds stadium opening in 1887, the area became a popular entertainment destination, especially on weekends. The cable car, land grading and building techniques of the 1890s and early 20th century later reinvented the Haight-Ashbury as a residential upper middle class homeowners' district. It was one of the few neighborhoods spared from the fires that followed the catastrophic San Francisco earthquake of 1906.

=== Depression and war ===
The Haight was hit hard by the Depression, as was much of the city. Residents with enough money to spare left the declining and crowded neighborhood for greener pastures within the growing limits, or newer, smaller suburban homes in the Bay Area. During World War II, the Edwardian and Victorian houses were divided into apartments to house workers. Others were converted into boarding homes for profit. By the 1950s, the Haight was a neighborhood in decline. Many buildings were left vacant after the war. Deferred maintenance also took its toll, and the exodus of middle class residents to newer suburbs continued to leave many units for rent.

=== Postwar ===
In the 1950s, a freeway was proposed that would have run through the Panhandle, but due to a citizen freeway revolt, it was canceled in a series of battles that lasted until 1966. The Haight Ashbury Neighborhood Council (HANC) was formed at the time of the 1959 revolt.

The Haight-Ashbury's elaborately detailed, 19th century, multi-story, wooden houses became a haven for hippies during the 1960s, due to the availability of cheap rooms and vacant properties for rent or sale in the district; property values had dropped in part because of the proposed freeway. The alternative culture that subsequently flourished there took root, and to some extent, has remained to this day.

=== Hippie community ===
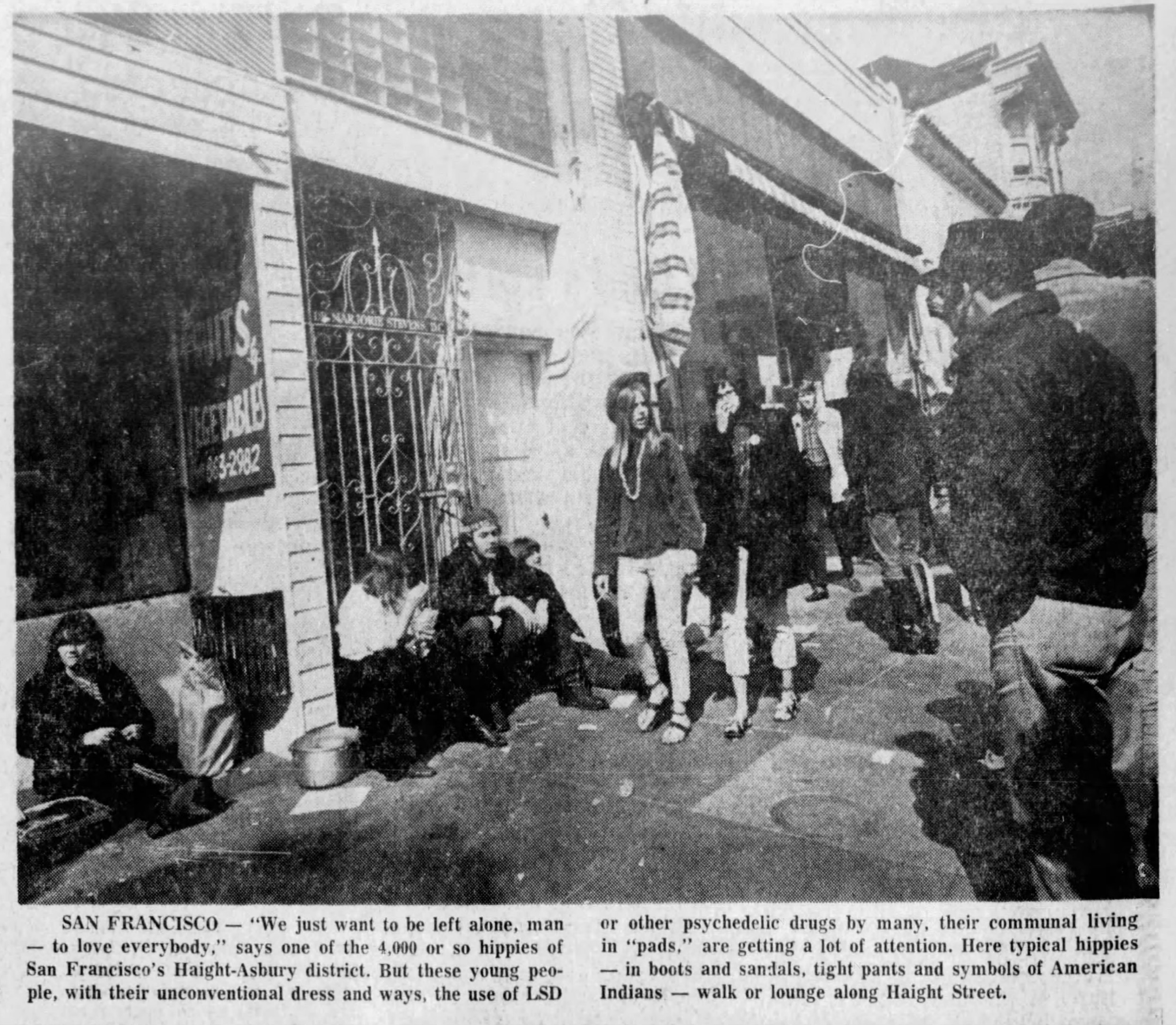
Newspaper clipping, April 30, 1967

The mainstream media's coverage of hippie life in the Haight-Ashbury drew the attention of youth from all over America. Hunter S. Thompson labeled the district "Hashbury" in The New York Times Magazine, and the activities in the area were reported almost daily. The Haight-Ashbury district was sought out by hippies to constitute a community based upon counterculture ideals, drugs, and music. This neighborhood offered a concentrated gathering spot for hippies to create a social experiment that would soon spread throughout the nation.

The first head shop, Ron and Jay Thelin's Psychedelic Shop, opened on Haight Street on January 3, 1966, offering hippies a spot to purchase marijuana and LSD, which was essential to hippie life in Haight-Ashbury. Along with businesses like the coffee shop The Blue Unicorn, the Psychedelic Shop quickly became one of the unofficial community centers for the growing numbers of hippies migrating to the neighborhood in 1966–67. The entire hippie community had easy access to drugs, which was perceived as a community unifier.

Another well-known neighborhood presence was the Diggers, a local "community anarchist" group known for its street theater, formed in the mid to late 1960s. One well known member of the group was Peter Coyote. The Diggers believed in a free society and the good in human nature. To express their belief, they established a free store, gave out free meals daily, and built a free medical clinic, which was the first of its kind, all of which relied on volunteers and donations. The Diggers were strongly opposed to a capitalistic society; they felt that by eliminating the need for money, people would be free to examine their own personal values, which would provoke people to change the way they lived to better suit their character, and thus lead a happier life.

During the 1967 Summer of Love, psychedelic rock music was entering the mainstream, receiving more and more commercial radio airplay. The Scott McKenzie song "San Francisco (Be Sure to Wear Flowers in Your Hair)," became a hit that year. The Monterey Pop Festival in June further cemented the status of psychedelic music as a part of mainstream culture and elevated local Haight bands such as the Grateful Dead, Big Brother and the Holding Company, Jefferson Airplane and Country Joe and The Fish to national stardom. A July 7, 1967 Time magazine cover story on "The Hippies: Philosophy of a Subculture," an August CBS News television report on "The Hippie Temptation" and other major media interest in the hippie subculture exposed the Haight-Ashbury district to enormous national attention and popularized the counterculture movement across the country and around the world. In September, Joan Didion published a famous essay on the Haight-Ashbury for The Saturday Evening Post titled "Slouching Towards Bethlehem". Based on her observations and interviews with the neighborhood's residents, the piece climaxes with Didion entering an apartment and seeing a five-year old girl high on acid. The essay, included in Didion's 1968 essay collection of the same name, is one of her most acclaimed and is considered a classic example of the New Journalism style that emerged in the 1960s.

The neighborhood's fame reached its peak as it became the haven for a number of psychedelic rock performers and groups of the time. The members of many bands lived close to the intersection. They not only immortalized the scene in song, but also knew many within the community.

The Summer of Love attracted a wide range of people of various ages: teenagers and college students drawn by their peers and the allure of joining a cultural utopia; middle-class vacationers; and even partying military personnel from bases within driving distance. The Haight-Ashbury could not accommodate this rapid influx of people, and the neighborhood scene quickly deteriorated. Overcrowding, homelessness, hunger, drug problems, and crime afflicted the neighborhood. Many people left in the autumn to resume their college studies. On October 6, 1967, in Buena Vista Park, those remaining in the Haight staged a mock funeral, Digger happening, "The Death of the Hippie" ceremony. News of the event was released by Ron Thelin on October 4, 1967, two days after the arrest of members of the Grateful Dead. Men shaved their beards and filled caskets to symbolize the dead hippie.

Mary Kasper explained the message of the mock funeral as:

We wanted to signal that this was the end of it, don't come out. Stay where you are! Bring the revolution to where you live. Don't come here because it's over and done with.

Ron Thelin stated that Haight-Ashbury was:

Portioned to us by the media-police, and the tourists came to the zoo to see the captive animals, and we growled fiercely behind the bars we accepted, and now we are no longer hippies and never were.

=== Post-Summer of Love decline and community organizing (1968–mid-1970s) ===
After 1967, Haight-Ashbury saw a rapid departure of residents due to overcrowding, high crime rates, and drug abuse, yet certain institutions such the Free Medical Clinic remained. The Haight-Ashbury Neighborhood Council (HANC) which had been created in 1960 to prevent the Panhandle Parkway project joined various San Francisco neighborhood groups to highlight inequities within San Francisco's political representation. The HANC fought to preserve historic Queen Anne-style architecture in the neighborhood by lobbying and organising historic house tours. Additionally, it successfully rezoned parts of the neighbourhood to protect houses and deter developers and absentee owners or landlords. The Park Police Station was reopened in 1972 following the passing of Proposition K, in an effort to increase safety in the neighbourhood. Countercultural communes such as the Good Earth Commune continued to be active and supported low-income housing and community policing.

=== Stabilization and cultural legacy (1970s–1990s) ===
Throughout the 1970s and 1980s, Haight-Ashbury saw an influx of middle-class families investing in homes. This revitalized the local economy but modified the hippie identity of the neighborhood. The HANC lobbied against commercialization, in particular opposing urbanization and developmental projects aimed at bringing chains and multi-unit housing developments. Grassroots organising and local activism in Haight Ashbury solidified itself in the political culture and legacy businesses including bookstores, boutiques and cafes marketed the essence of the sixties counterculture. In the 1980s, the Haight also became an epicenter for the San Francisco comedy scene when a small coffee house near Haight Street, in Cole Valley, called The Other Café, 100 Carl Street at Cole Street (currently the restaurant Crepes on Cole) became a full-time comedy club that helped launch the careers of Robin Williams, Dana Carvey, and Whoopi Goldberg.

While the neighbourhood had been a place of convergence for the gay community in the 1960s, the AIDS epidemic in the 1980s caused the deaths and relocation of many gay residents in the Haight. Many gay bars, businesses and clubs shut down and were replaced with new businesses less catered to gay audiences, but existing cooperative medical and political establishments such as Haight Ashbury Free Clinic were instrumental in ensuring access to medical aid through their needle exchange program that decreased the spread of HIV/AIDS.

=== Preservation, gentrification and cultural identity (2000s–present) ===
Preservation efforts in the 1990s and onwards have emphasized the neighbourhood's role as a pilgrimage site for countercultural history. The Doolan-Larson Building (located at Haight and Ashbury) was built in 1903 and became a symbol of the 1960s counterculture. It was added to the National Register of Historic Places in 2011 and has been operated by the non-profit San Francisco Heritage since 2018. The space has served as a collaborative space for community organisers and artists to preserve counter cultural legacy and foster community artistic expression.

Annual events like the Haight-Ashbury Street Fair and cultural festivals celebrate the area's countercultural past. It has become a hotspot for tourists and locals alike, with walking tours, city-sponsored projects and boutiques or coffee shops tied to the counterculture ethos. Gentrification has strongly impacted Haight-Ashbury and led to increased property values and rents, displacing long-term residents and hindering affordable housing efforts. However, affordable housing initiatives such as a 100% affordable housing project at 730 Stanyan Street (the former site of a McDonald's restaurant) have provided 160 affordable units for low- to moderate-income families and transitional-age youth who have experienced homelessness.

== Attractions and characteristics ==
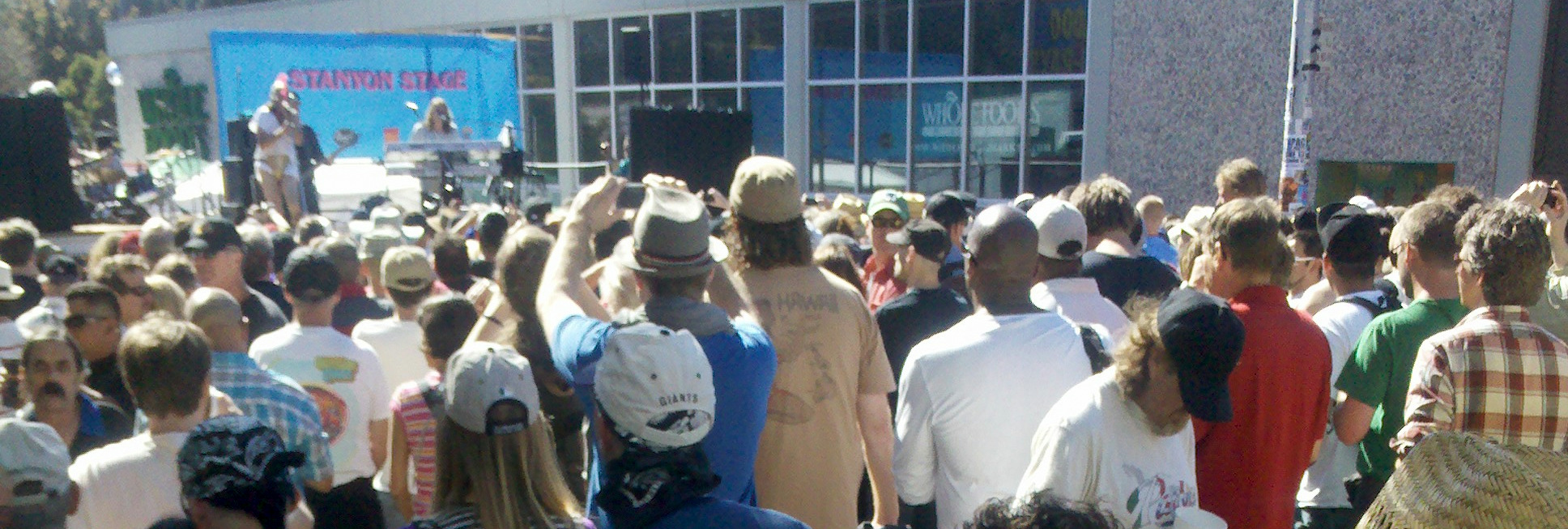
The Tubes performing at 2012 Haight-Ashbury Street Fair

The Haight-Ashbury Street Fair started in 1978 and is held each year. This event attracts thousands of people, during which Haight Street is closed to vehicular traffic between Stanyan and Masonic, with one sound stage at each end.

== See also ==
- The Red Victorian
