= Errico Malatesta bibliography =

Errico Malatesta was an Italian anarchist and revolutionary socialist. Unless otherwise noted, all works are authored solely by Errico Malatesta.

== Books ==
English title	Original title	Date Published	Online	Notes
Anarchy	L'Anarchia	1891	Wikisource, Marxists Internet Archive, The Anarchist Library	
Between Peasants: A Dialogue on Anarchy	Fra Contadini: Dialogo sull'anarchia	1884	Marxists Internet Archive, The Anarchist Library	
At The Café: Conversations on Anarchism		1922	Marxists Internet Archive, The Anarchist Library	

== Articles ==
English title	Original title	Published In	Date Published	Online	Notes
About a Strike	A proposito di uno sciopero	L'Associazione, n. 1	1889	The Anarchist Library	
About my trial: Class Struggle or Class Hatred?		Umanità Nova, n. 137	20 September 1921	Marxists Internet Archive, The Anarchist Library	
Against the Constituent Assembly as Against the Dictatorship			4 October 1930	Marxists Internet Archive, The Anarchist Library	
Against Monarchy: A Call to All Progressive People or Against Monarchy: Appeal to all forward-looking men	Contro la Monarchia		August 1899	Marxists Internet Archive, The Anarchist Library	Published as an anonymous pamphlet, presumably during Malatesta's short stay in London
Anarchism and Organization			1897	Marxists Internet Archive, The Anarchist Library	
Anarchism and Reforms			March 1924	Marxists Internet Archive, The Anarchist Library	
Anarchism and Syndicalism			1907	The Anarchist Library	
Anarchism in the Workers' Movement	L'anarchismo nel movimento operajo	L'Agitazione, no. 30	7 October 1897	Marxists Internet Archive, The Anarchist Library	
Anarchism's Evolution	Evoluzione dell'anarchismo (A proposito di un'intervista)	L'Agitazione, no. 31	14 October 1897	The Anarchist Library	
An Anarchist Programme	Programma Anarchico		1920	The Anarchist Library	Adopted as official programme by the Unione Anarchica Italiana at its Congress in Bologna
Anarchist Propaganda			1890	Marxists Internet Archive, The Anarchist Library	
The Anarchist Revolution			1922	Marxists Internet Archive, The Anarchist Library	
Anarchists and the Situation		Freedom, no. 242	June 1909	The Anarchist Library	
Anarchists Have Forgotten Their Principles		Freedom	November 1914	Marxists Internet Archive, The Anarchist Library	
The Anarchists in the Present Time		Vogliamo!	June 1930	Marxists Internet Archive, The Anarchist Library	
The Anarchists' Task	Il compito degli anarchici	La Questione Sociale, no. 13	2 December 1899	Marxists Internet Archive, The Anarchist Library	
Anarchists, the War and Their Principles		Freedom	November 1914	The Anarchist Library	
Anarchy and Violence		Liberty, No. 9	1894	Marxists Internet Archive, The Anarchist Library	
Another Strike	Un altro sciopero	L'Associazione, no. 2	16 October 1889	Marxists Internet Archive, The Anarchist Library	
The Armed Strike	Lo sciopero armato	Lo Sciopero Generale, no. 3	2 June 1902	The Anarchist Library	
A Bit Of Theory or A Little Theory	Un peu de théorie	L'En Dehors	August 1892	Wikisource, Marxists Internet Archive, The Anarchist Library	
Bourgeois Seepage Into Socialist Doctrine	Infiltrazioni borghesi nella dottrina socialista	Il Pensiero, no. 10	16 May 1905	The Anarchist Library	
Capitalists and Thieves	Capitalistes et voleurs: A propos des tragédies de Houndsditch et Sidney Street	Les Temps Nouveaux, no. 23	18 February 1911	The Anarchist Library	According to Rudolf Rocker, the first version to appear was in London by Der Arbeter Fraint on 27 January 1911
Comments on the Article 'Science and Anarchy'			July 1925	Marxists Internet Archive, The Anarchist Library	
Communism and Individualism			April 1926	Marxists Internet Archive, The Anarchist Library	A comment on an article by German historian and anarchist Max Nettlau
Dear Comrades at Ilota	Cari Compagni dell'Ilota	Ilota (Pistoia) 1, no. 9	1 April 1883	Marxists Internet Archive, The Anarchist Library	
Democracy and Anarchy		Pensiero e Volontà	March 1924	Marxists Internet Archive, The Anarchist Library	
Doing Good By Force	Le bien par la force	L'Idée, no. 7	15 October 1894	The Anarchist Library	
The Duties of the Present Hour		Liberty, no. 8	August 1894	Marxists Internet Archive, The Anarchist Library	
The Duty of Resistance			30 May 1897	The Anarchist Library	
The Economic Question	Questione economica	La Questione Sociale, no. 13	29 June 1884	Marxists Internet Archive, The Anarchist Library	
Errors And Remedies	Errori e rimedi	L'Anarchia	August 1896	Marxists Internet Archive, The Anarchist Library	
A Few Words To Bring The Controversy To An End	Poche parole per chiudere la polemica	L'Agitazione, no. 6	18 April 1897	The Anarchist Library	
The First of May		The Commonweal, no. 1	1 May 1893	The Anarchist Library	
From a Matter of Tactics to a Matter of Principle	Da una questione di tattica a una questione di principii		28 March 1897	The Anarchist Library	Response to article written by Francesco Saverio Merlino
Further Thoughts on Anarchism and the Labour Movement			March 1926	Marxists Internet Archive, The Anarchist Library	
Further Thoughts on Revolution in Practice		Umanità Nova, no.192	14 October 1922	Marxists Internet Archive, The Anarchist Library	
Further Thoughts on Science and Anarchy: Necessity and Liberty			February 1926	Marxists Internet Archive, The Anarchist Library	
The General Strike And The Revolution		The Torch, no. 3	August 1894	The Anarchist Library	
Gradualism	Gradualismo	Pensiero e Volantà, no.12	1 October 1925	Marxists Internet Archive, The Anarchist Library	
How to Get… What You Want	Come si conquista… quel che si vuole	L'Agitazione, no. 5 and no. 7	12/25 April 1897	Marxists Internet Archive, The Anarchist Library	Originally released in two parts
The Idea of Good Government		Umanità Nova	1920	Marxists Internet Archive, The Anarchist Library	
Individualism and Communism in Anarchism			July 1924	Marxists Internet Archive, The Anarchist Library	
Individualism in Anarchism	L'Individualismo nell'Anarchismo and Ancora sull'Individualismo	L'Agitazione, no. 6	18/25 April 1897	Marxists Internet Archive, The Anarchist Library	Originally released in two parts
In Relation to Strikes	A proposito di scioperi	La Rivoluzione Sociale, no. 2	18 October 1902	The Anarchist Library	
The Irreconcilable Contradiction	La contradizione irreduttibile	La Questione Sociale, vol. 6, no. 30	31 March 1900	Marxists Internet Archive, The Anarchist Library	
Let's Demolish — and then?			1926	Marxists Internet Archive, The Anarchist Library	
Let Us Be Of Good Cheer!			1 May 1897	The Anarchist Library	
Let Us Go To The People	Andiamo fra il popolo	L'Art. 248, no. 5	4 February 1894	Marxists Internet Archive, The Anarchist Library	
Liberty and Fatalism: Determinism and Will	Libertà e fatalità: Determinismo e volontà	Volontà, no. 24	22 November 1913	The Anarchist Library	
A Little Theory		Freedom, vol. 37, no. 41	October 1923	Marxists Internet Archive, The Anarchist Library	
Majorities and Minorities				Marxists Internet Archive, The Anarchist Library	
Matters Revolutionary	Questions révolutionnaires	La Révolte 4, no. 4	4-10 October 1890	Marxists Internet Archive, The Anarchist Library	
The Monza Tragedy: Causes and Effects	La tragedia di Monza: Cause ed Effetti		September 1900	The Anarchist Library	
Mussolini in Power	Mussolini al potere	Umanità Nova	25 November 1922	Marxists Internet Archive, The Anarchist Library	
Mutual Aid: An Essay			1909	Marxists Internet Archive, The Anarchist Library	
Neither Democrats, nor Dictators: Anarchists		Pensiero e Volontà	May 1926	Marxists Internet Archive, The Anarchist Library	
Note on Hz's article, 'Science and Anarchy'			September 1925	Marxists Internet Archive, The Anarchist Library	
Note on Medicine and Anarchism		Pensiero e Volontà, No. 9	10 May 1924	Marxists Internet Archive, The Anarchist Library	
Note to the article "Individualism and Anarchism" by Adamas		Pensiero e Volontà, n. 15	August 1924	Marxists Internet Archive, The Anarchist Library	
On 'Anarchist Revisionism'			May 1924	Marxists Internet Archive, The Anarchist Library	
Organization	L'organizzazione	L'Agitazione, Nos. 13–15	4/11/18 June 1897	Marxists Internet Archive, The Anarchist Library	Originally released in three parts
Our Foreign Policy	La Nostra Politica Estera	Volontà, no. 10	7 March 1914	Marxists Internet Archive, The Anarchist Library	
Our Plans: Union Between Communists and Collectivists	I nostri propositi. I. L'Unione tra comunisti e collettivisti	L'Associazione, no. 4	30 November 1889	Marxists Internet Archive, The Anarchist Library	
Our Tactics	La nostra tattica	L'Agitazione, no. 35	11 November 1897	The Anarchist Library	
The Paris Commune	Il Comune di Parigi	La Questione Sociale, nos. 28-29	17 an 24 March 1900	Marxists Internet Archive, The Anarchist Library	
Peter Kropotkin: Recollections and Criticisms of an Old Friend	Pietro Kropotkin: Ricordi e Critiche di un Vecchio Amicco		April 15, 1931	Marxists Internet Archive, The Anarchist Library	Published in 2015 as part of a book Life and Ideas: The Anarchist Writings of Errico Malatesta and also in 2018 in czech in a zine Malatesta (životopisné poznámky).
The Products of Soil and Industry: An Anarchist Concern	Los productos de la tierra y de la industria	El Productor 5, no. 278	24 December 1891	Marxists Internet Archive, The Anarchist Library	
Pro-Government Anarchists			April 1916	Marxists Internet Archive, The Anarchist Library	
A Project of Anarchist Organisation			October 1927	Marxists Internet Archive, The Anarchist Library	
Propaganda by Deeds: One Way of Marking Socialism's Anniversaries	La propaganda a fatti	L'Associazione 1, no. 2	16 October 1889	Marxists Internet Archive, The Anarchist Library	
Pseudo-Scientific Aberrations			November 1925	Marxists Internet Archive, The Anarchist Library	
Questions of Tactics		Almanacco Libertario	1931	Marxists Internet Archive, The Anarchist Library	
Reformism			1920s	Marxists Internet Archive, The Anarchist Library	
Republic and Revolution			July 1924	Marxists Internet Archive, The Anarchist Library	
The Republic of the Boys and that of the Bearded Men	La repubblica dei giovanetti e quella degli uomini colla barba	La Questione Sociale, no. 3	5 January 1884	Marxists Internet Archive, The Anarchist Library	
Resistance Societies	Leghe di resistenza	Agitiamoci per il Socialismo Anarchico	1 May 1897	Marxists Internet Archive, The Anarchist Library	First published in Agitiamoci per il Socialismo Anarchico which was a replacement for no. 8 of L'Agitazione.
A Revolt is No Revolution	La sommossa non è rivoluzione	L'Associazione, no. 3	27 October 1889	Marxists Internet Archive, The Anarchist Library	
The Revolutionary "Haste"		Umanità Nova, n. 125	6 September 1921	Marxists Internet Archive, The Anarchist Library	
Revolutionary Terror: Thoughts on a Possibly Near Future			October 1924	The Anarchist Library	
Revolution in Practice		Umanità Nova, n. 191	7 October 1922	Marxists Internet Archive, The Anarchist Library	
Should Anarchists Be Admitted to the Coming International Congress?		The Labour Leader 8, no. 119	11 July 1896	The Anarchist Library	
Some Thoughts on the Post-Revolutionary Property System			November 1929	Marxists Internet Archive, The Anarchist Library	
Syndicalism and Anarchism			April-May 1925	Marxists Internet Archive, The Anarchist Library	
Tactical Matters	Questions de tactique	La Révolte 6, no. 3	1–7 October 1892	Marxists Internet Archive, The Anarchist Library	
A Talk About Anarchist Communism Between Two Workers			1933	Marxists Internet Archive, The Anarchist Library	
The Suffragettes	Le Suffragette	Volontà	22/6/1913	Marxists Internet Archive, The Anarchist Library	
Towards Anarchism	Verso l'anarchia	La Questione Sociale	9 December 1899	Marxists Internet Archive, The Anarchist Library	
The Tragic Bandits		La Société Nouvelle, no. 2	August 1913	Marxists Internet Archive, The Anarchist Library	
Violence as a Social Factor			April 1895	Marxists Internet Archive, The Anarchist Library	
The War and the Anarchists	La guerra e gli anarchici	La Guerra Tripolina	April 1912	The Anarchist Library	
What is to be done?		Umanità Nova, n. 185	August 26, 1922	Marxists Internet Archive, The Anarchist Library	
Why Fascism Won	Perché il fascismo vinse	Libero Accordo	28 August 1923	Marxists Internet Archive, The Anarchist Library	

== Letters ==
English title	Original title	Published In	Date Published	Online	Notes
First answer to Émile Henry		L'Eclair	30 August 1892	Wikisource	First answer to Émile Henry's criticism of his 'A Bit of Theory' article
Further thoughts on the question of crime		Umanità Nova, no. 134	16 September 1921	Marxists Internet Archive, The Anarchist Library	
On Collective Responsibility				Marxists Internet Archive, The Anarchist Library	Letter to the anarchist group of the 18e Arrondissement in Paris.
On the Dictatorship of the Proletariat: A Prophetic Letter to Luigi Fabbri			30 July 1919	Marxists Internet Archive, The Anarchist Library	
Reply to Nestor Makhno: In reply to About the Platform		Umanità Nova, n. 137	20 September 1921	Marxists Internet Archive, The Anarchist Library	Reply to Nestor Makhnos letter About the Platform which was a reply to Malatestas article A Project of Anarchist Organisation.
The Labour Movement and Anarchism			December 1925	Marxists Internet Archive, The Anarchist Library	Open letter addressed to the editors of El Productor
Letter to The Bulletin De La Fédération Jurassienne: The Italian federal delegates to the Berne Congress		Bulletin de la Fédération Jurassienne 5, no. 49	3 December 1876	Marxists Internet Archive, The Anarchist Library	
Signor Malatesta Explains	Il signor Malatesta si spiega	Il Progresso Italo-Americano 20, n. 200	23 August 1899	The Anarchist Library	
Second answer to Émile Henry		L'En Dehors	4 September 1892	Wikisource	
The Socialists and the Elections	I socialisti e le elezioni: Una lettera di E. Malatesta	Il Messaggero 19, no. 38	7 February 1897	The Anarchist Library	

== Collected works ==
- The Complete Works of Malatesta by AK Press
