= 1881 =

CaIendar year

1881 in various calendars
- Gregorian calendar: 1881; MDCCCLXXXI
- Ab urbe condita: 2634
- Armenian calendar: 1330; ԹՎ ՌՅԼ
- Assyrian calendar: 6631
- Baháʼí calendar: 37–38
- Balinese saka calendar: 1802–1803
- Bengali calendar: 1287–1288
- Berber calendar: 2831
- British Regnal year: 44 Vict. 1 – 45 Vict. 1
- Buddhist calendar: 2425
- Burmese calendar: 1243
- Byzantine calendar: 7389–7390
- Chinese calendar: 庚辰年 (Metal Dragon); 4578 or 4371 — to — 辛巳年 (Metal Snake); 4579 or 4372
- Coptic calendar: 1597–1598
- Discordian calendar: 3047
- Ethiopian calendar: 1873–1874
- Hebrew calendar: 5641–5642
- Hindu calendars
- Vikram Samvat: 1937–1938
- Shaka Samvat: 1802–1803
- Kali Yuga: 4981–4982
- Holocene calendar: 11881
- Igbo calendar: 881–882
- Iranian calendar: 1259–1260
- Islamic calendar: 1298–1299
- Japanese calendar: Meiji 14 (明治１４年)
- Javanese calendar: 1809–1811
- Julian calendar: Gregorian minus 12 days
- Korean calendar: 4214
- Minguo calendar: 31 before ROC 民前31年
- Nanakshahi calendar: 413
- Thai solar calendar: 2423–2424
- Tibetan calendar: ལྕགས་ཕོ་འབྲུག་ལོ་ (male Iron-Dragon); 2007 or 1626 or 854 — to — ལྕགས་མོ་སྦྲུལ་ལོ་ (female Iron-Snake); 2008 or 1627 or 855

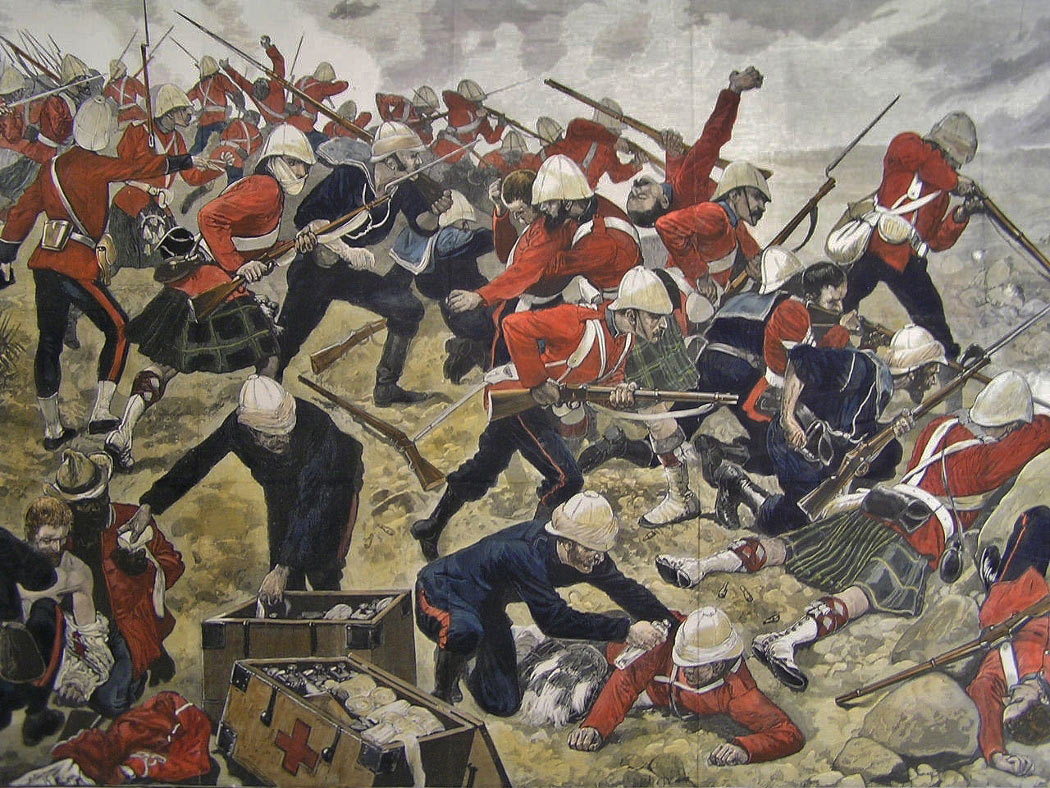
February 27: Battle of Majuba Hill

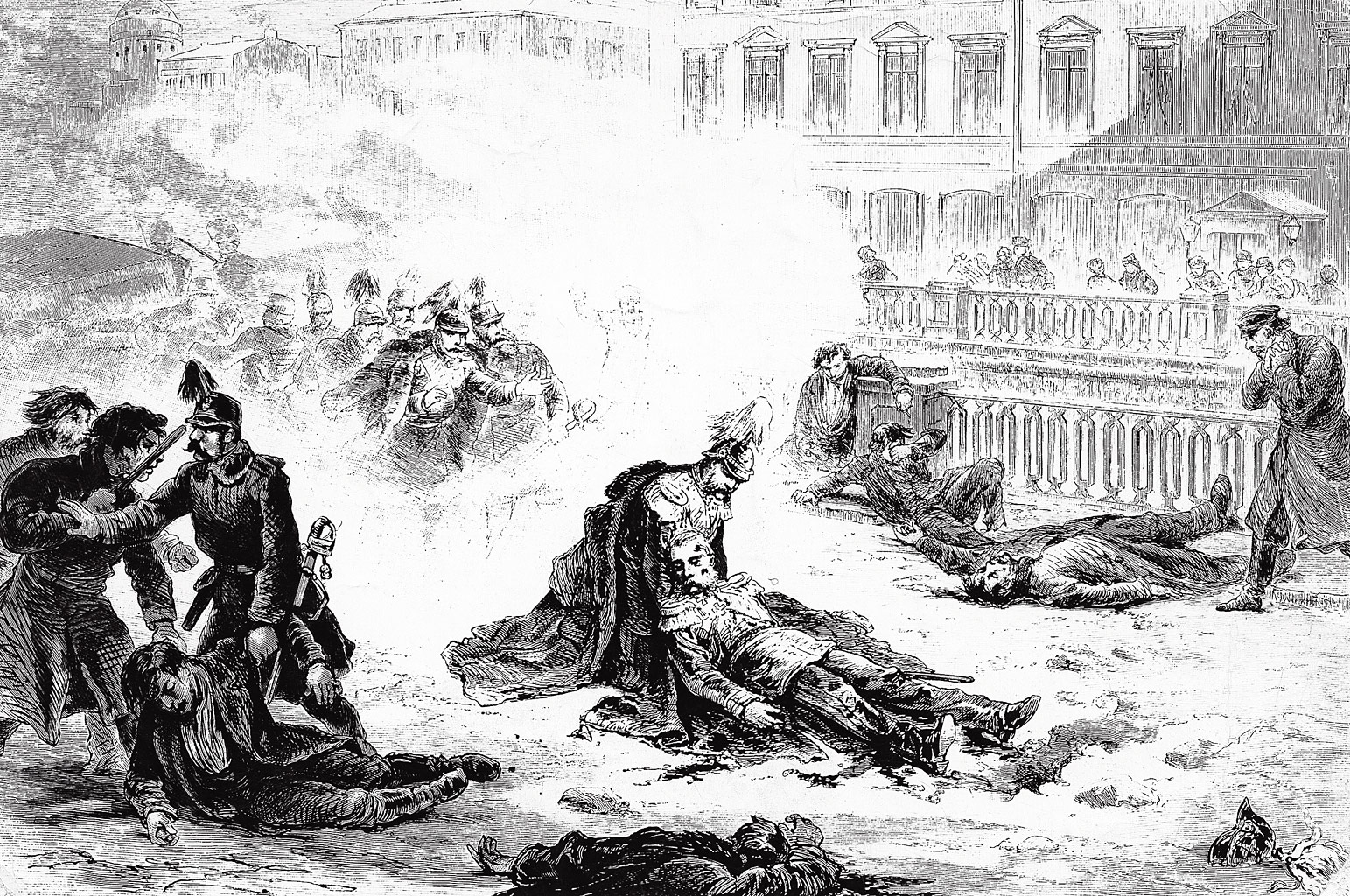
March 13: Alexander II of Russia is assassinated.

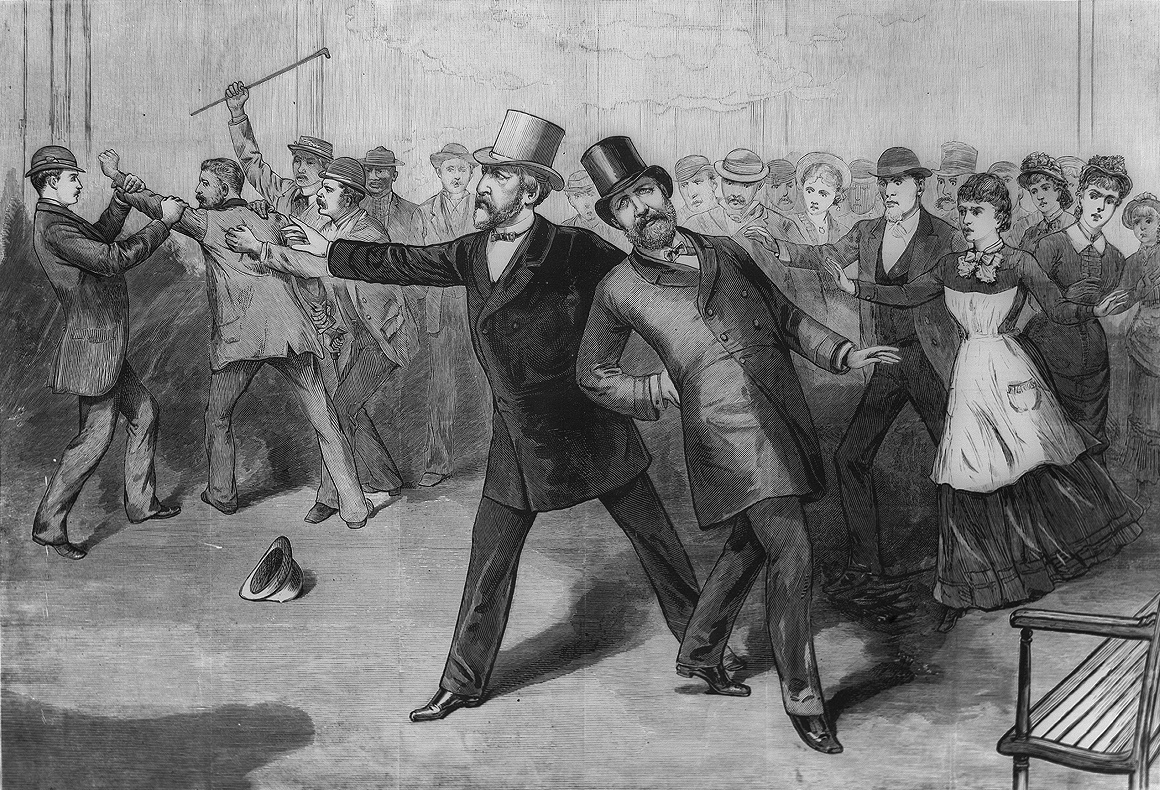
July 2: Assassination of James A. Garfield

1881 (MDCCCLXXXI) was a common year starting on Saturday of the Gregorian calendar and a common year starting on Thursday of the Julian calendar, the 1881st year of the Common Era (CE) and Anno Domini (AD) designations, the 881st year of the 2nd millennium, the 81st year of the 19th century, and the 2nd year of the 1880s decade. As of the start of 1881, the Gregorian calendar was 12 days ahead of the Julian calendar, which remained in localized use until 1923.

== Events ==
=== January ===
- January 1–24 – Siege of Geok Tepe: Russian troops under General Mikhail Skobelev defeat the Turkomans.
- January 13 – War of the Pacific – Battle of San Juan and Chorrillos: The Chilean army defeats Peruvian forces.
- January 15 – War of the Pacific – Battle of Miraflores: The Chileans take Lima, capital of Peru, after defeating its second line of defense in Miraflores.
- January 24 – William Edward Forster, chief secretary for Ireland, introduces his Coercion Bill, which temporarily suspends habeas corpus so that those people suspected of committing an offence can be detained without trial; it goes through a long debate before it is accepted February 2. Note that Coercion bills had been passed almost annually in the 19th century, with a total of 105 such bills passed from 1801 to 1921.
- January 25 – Thomas Edison and Alexander Graham Bell form the Oriental Telephone Company.

=== February ===
- February 13 – The first issue of the feminist newspaper La Citoyenne is published by Hubertine Auclert in Paris.
- February 16 – The Canadian Pacific Railway is incorporated.
- February 18 – Carlos Finlay introduces his discovery of the transmission of Yellow Fever by mosquitoes Aedes aegypti, in the Fifth International Sanitary Conference held in Washington, D.C.
- February 19 – Kansas becomes the first U.S. state to prohibit all alcoholic beverages.
- February 24 (February 12 Old Style) – Qing dynasty China signs the Treaty of Saint Petersburg with the Russian Empire providing for the return to China of the eastern part of the Ili Basin.
- February 25 – Phoenix, Arizona, is incorporated.

=== March ===
- March 1 – The Cunard Line's SS Servia, the first large steel transatlantic liner, is launched at Clydebank in Scotland.
- March 13 (March 1 Old Style) – Assassination of Alexander II of Russia: Emperor Alexander II of Russia ("the Liberator") is killed near his palace in Saint Petersburg when bombs are thrown at him, an act committed by the revolutionary socialist group Narodnaya Volya coordinated by Sophia Perovskaya but falsely blamed upon Russian Jews. He is succeeded by his son, Alexander III. The assassin Ignacy Hryniewiecki is also killed by his own bomb.
- March 23
  - The First Boer War comes to an end.
  - A fire caused by a gas explosion destroys the Opéra de Nice in the south of France with fatalities.
- March 26 (March 14 Old Style) – The Principality of Romania is proclaimed the Kingdom of Romania.
- March 31 – Edward Rudolf founds the 'Church of England Central Society for Providing Homes for Waifs and Strays' (later The Children's Society).

=== April ===
- April 11 – Spelman College is established in Atlanta, Georgia.
- April 14 – The Four Dead in Five Seconds Gunfight erupts in El Paso, Texas.
- April 15
  - Temuco, Chile, is founded.
  - Anti-Semitic pogroms in Southern Russia begin.
- April 21 – The University of Connecticut is founded as the Storrs Agricultural School.
- April 25 – Caulfield Grammar School is founded in Melbourne, Australia.
- April 28 – Billy the Kid escapes from his 2 jailers at the Lincoln County Jail in Mesilla, New Mexico, killing James Bell and Robert Ollinger, before stealing a horse and riding out of town.
- April 30 – SS Tararua hits a reef and sinks off the coast of New Zealand's South Island with only 20 survivors of the 151 on board.

=== May ===
- May 12 – In North Africa, Tunisia becomes a French protectorate by the Treaty of Bardo.
- May 13 – The Pacific island of Rotuma cedes to Great Britain, becoming a dependency of the Colony of Fiji.

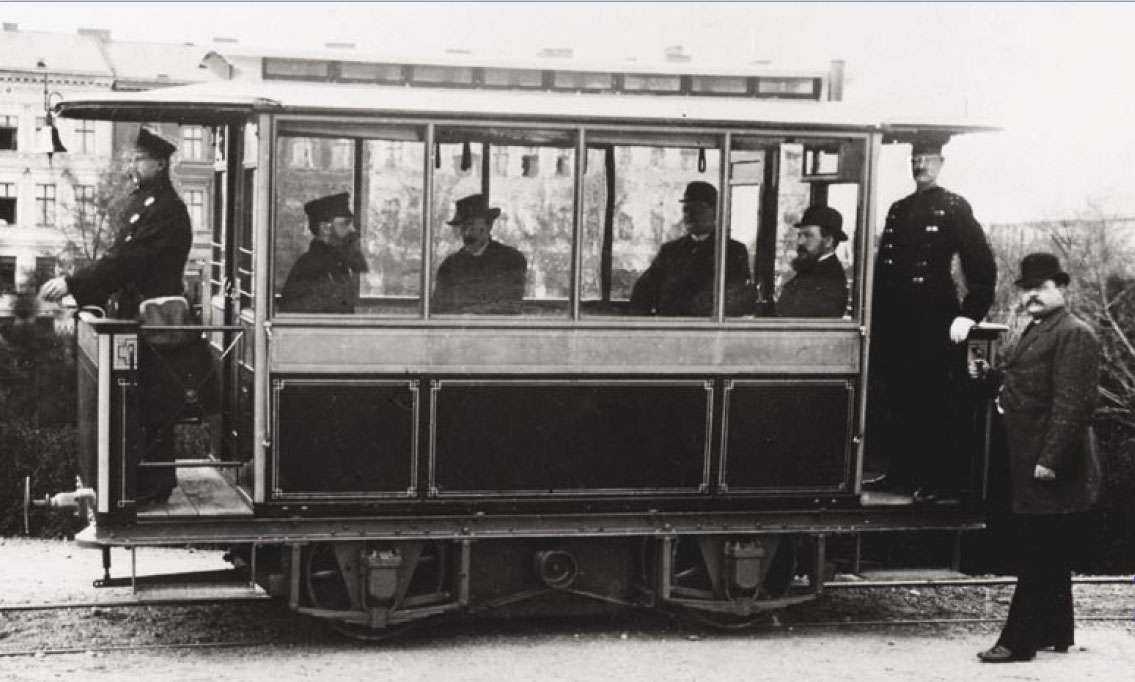
World's first regular electric tram service started in Berlin

- May 16 – The world's first regular electric tram service is started near Berlin, by Siemens & Halske.
- May 21
  - The American Red Cross is established by Clara Barton.
  - The United States Tennis Association is established by a small group of tennis club members; the first U.S. Tennis Championships are played this year.
- May 22 (May 10 Old Style) – Prince Karl of Hohenzollern-Sigmaringen is crowned King of Romania.

=== June ===
- June 12 – The USS Jeannette is crushed in an Arctic Ocean ice pack.
- June 18 – The League of the Three Emperors is resurrected.
- June 20 – The current Cincinnati Reds baseball team plays its first game.
- June 26 – War of the Pacific – Battle of Sangrar: Peruvian and Chilean forces battle to a draw.

=== July ===
- July 1 – General Order 70, the culmination of the Cardwell–Childers reforms of the British Army's organization, comes into effect.
- July 2 – Assassination of James A. Garfield: United States President James A. Garfield is shot by lawyer Charles J. Guiteau in Washington, D.C. The wound becomes infected, killing Garfield on September 19.
- July 4 – Tuskegee Institute opens in Alabama.
- July 7 – The first episode of Carlo Collodi's The Adventures of Pinocchio is published in Italy.
- July 14–20 – The London Social Revolutionary Congress is held; delegates include Marie Le Compte, Peter Kropotkin, Errico Malatesta, Saverio Merlino, Louise Michel, Nikolai Tchaikovsky and Émile Gautier.
- July 14 – Billy the Kid is shot and killed by Pat Garrett, outside Fort Sumner, New Mexico.
- July 20 – American Indian Wars: Sioux chief Sitting Bull leads the last of his people in surrender to United States troops at Fort Buford in Montana.
- July 23 – The Boundary Treaty of 1881 between Chile and Argentina is signed in Buenos Aires.

=== August ===
- August 3 – The Pretoria Convention peace treaty is signed, officially ending the war between the Boers and Britain.
- August 27 – The fifth hurricane of the Atlantic season hits Florida and the Carolinas, killing about 700.

=== September ===
- September 5 – The Thumb Fire in the U.S. state of Michigan destroys over a million acres (4,000 km^{2}) and kills 282 people.
- September 12 – Francis Howell High School (Howell Institute) in St. Charles, Missouri, and Stephen F. Austin High School in Austin, Texas, open on the same day, putting them in a tie for the title of the oldest public high school west of the Mississippi River.
- September 19 – President James A. Garfield dies eleven weeks after being shot. Vice President Chester A. Arthur becomes the 21st president of the United States.
- September 26 – Godalming becomes the first town in England to have its streets illuminated by electric light (hydroelectrically generated).

=== October ===
- October 5–December 31 – The International Cotton Exposition is held in Atlanta, Georgia, USA.
- October 10 – Richard D'Oyly Carte's Savoy Theatre opens in London, the world's first public building to be fully lit by electricity, using Joseph Swan's incandescent light bulbs.
- October 13 – Determined to bring about the revival of the Hebrew language as a way of unifying Jews, Eliezer Ben-Yehuda has what is believed to be the first conversation in Modern Hebrew, with friends living in Paris.
- October 26 – The Gunfight at the O.K. Corral occurs in Tombstone, Cochise County, Arizona, USA.
- October 29 – The satirical magazine Judge is first published in the United States.

=== November ===
- November 3 – The Mapuche uprising of 1881 begins with an attack on Quillem, Chile.
- November 9 – Brahms' Piano Concerto No. 2 premieres in Budapest with the composer as soloist.
- November 11 – The Clarkson Memorial to an anti-slavery campaigner in Wisbech (England) is completed and unveiled to the public.
- November 19 – A meteorite strikes the Earth near the village of Großliebenthal, a few kilometers southwest of Odesa, Ukraine.
- November – Newcastle United F.C. is founded in the northeast of England as Stanley F.C., with a further name change to Newcastle East End F.C. the following year.

=== December ===
- December 8 – At least 380 die in a fire at the Vienna Ringtheater.
- December 25 – Catholic religious congregation Mothers of the Forsaken and Saint Joseph of the Mountain is founded by Blessed Petra of Saint Joseph.
- December 25–27 – The Warsaw pogrom is carried out in Vistula Land, Russian Empire.
- December 28 – Virgil Earp is ambushed in Tombstone, Arizona, and loses the use of his left arm.

=== Date unknown ===
- Kinshasa (the capital of the modern-day Democratic Republic of the Congo) is founded by Henry Morton Stanley as a trading outpost called Léopoldville.
- On the Isle of Man (an internally self-governing dependent territory of the United Kingdom), the House of Keys Election Act extends the franchise for the national legislature to spinsters and widows owning real estate of a certain value.
- The Pali Text Society is founded by British scholar Thomas William Rhys Davids, for the study of Pali (Ceylonese) texts.
- Some Vatican archives are opened to scholars for the first time.
- Abilene, Texas, is founded.
- Rafaela, Argentina, is formed.
- New York City's oldest independent school for girls, the Convent of the Sacred Heart New York (91st Street), is founded.
- Culford School, a public school in Suffolk, England, is founded as the East Anglian School for Boys.
- Meiji Law School, predecessor of Meiji University, is founded in Yurakucho, Tokyo, Japan.
- Tokyo Law College, predecessor of Hosei University, is founded in Japan.
- The Vocational and Technical College of Tokyo, later Tokyo Institute of Technology, is founded in Japan.
- Hattori Watch Shop (服部時計店) is founded by Kanetarō Hattori in Ginza, Tokyo, Japan, predecessor of watch brand Seiko.
- Leyton Orient F.C. is founded in London.

== Births ==
=== January ===
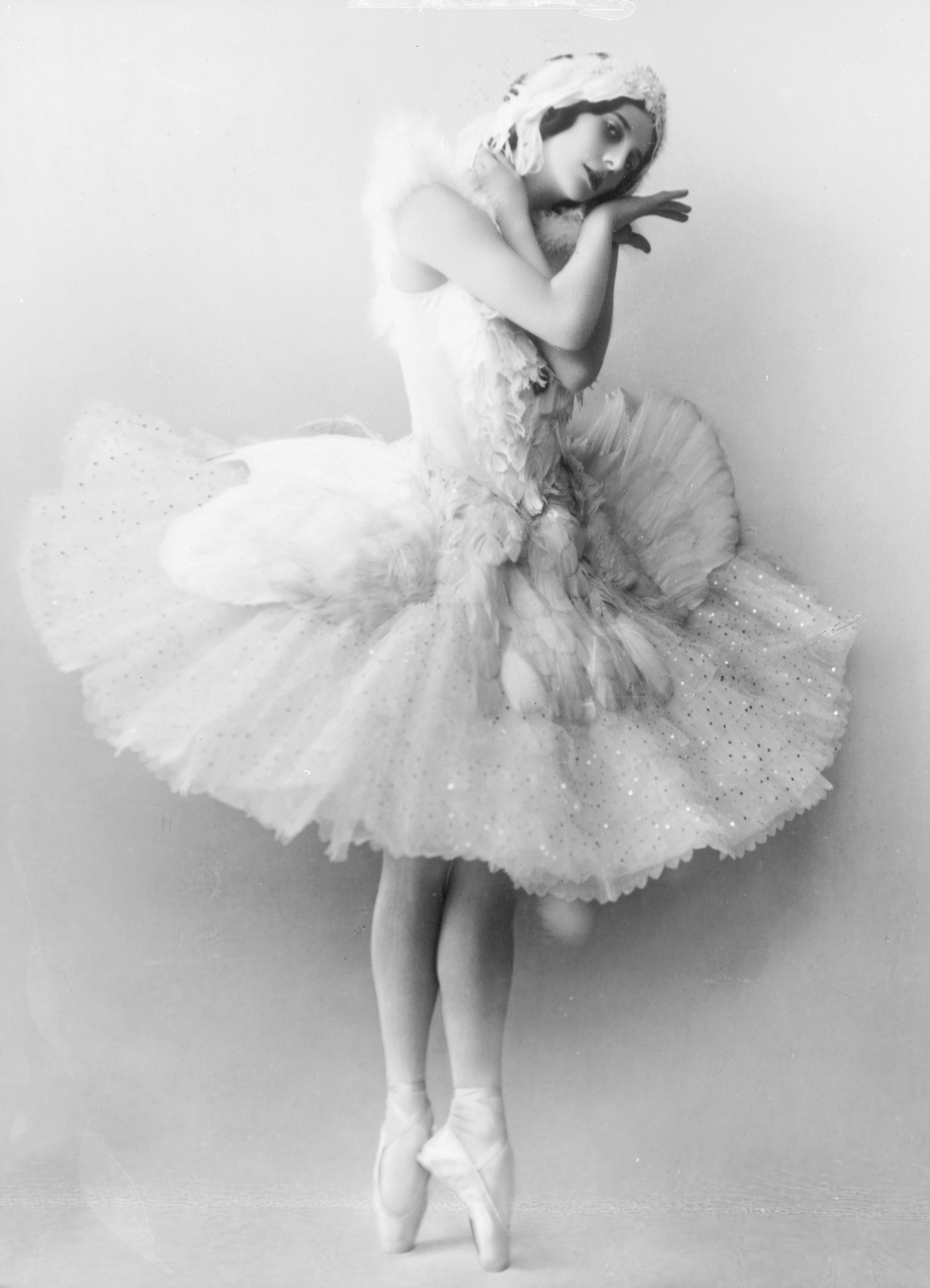
Anna Pavlova

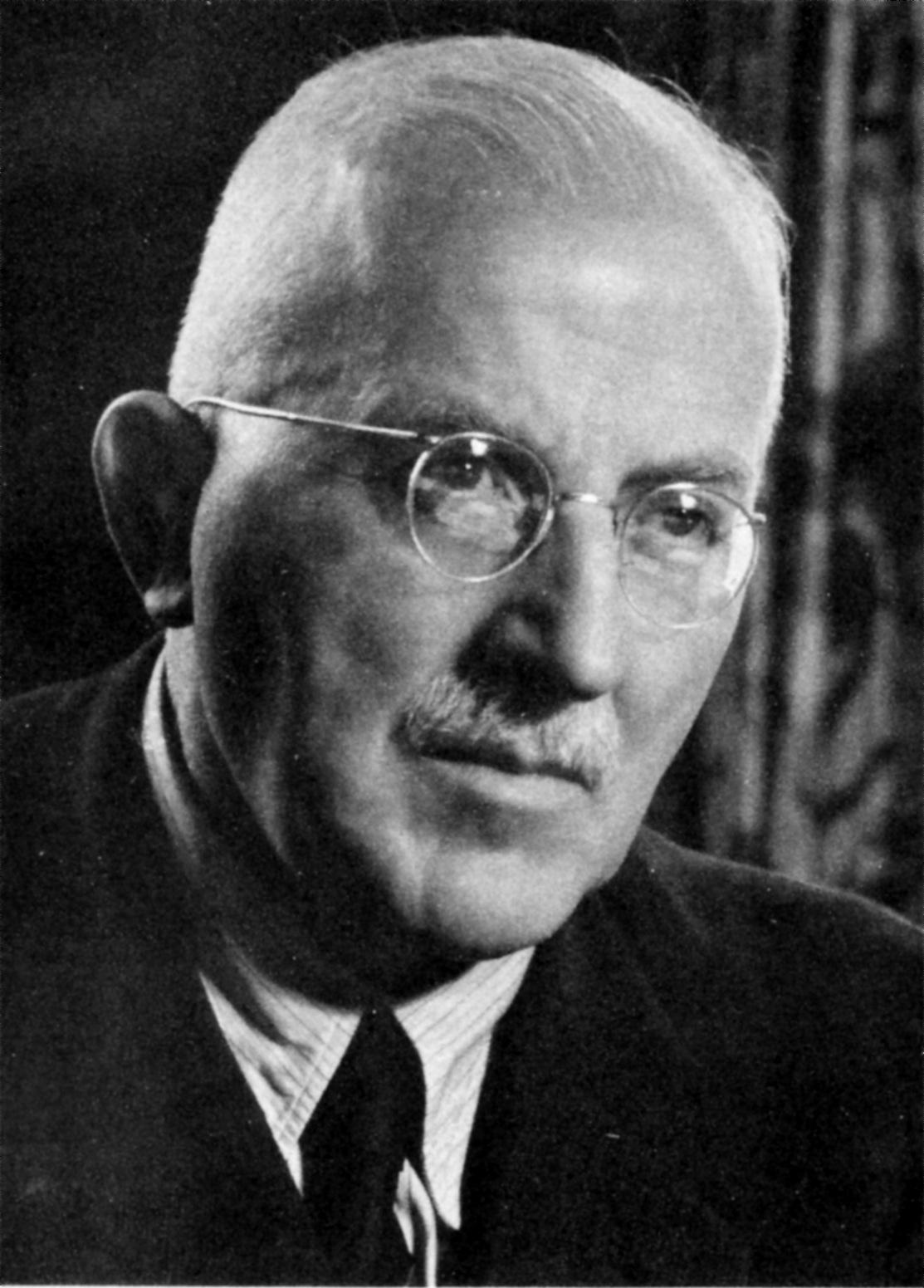
Hermann Staudinger

- January 9
  - Lascelles Abercrombie, English poet, critic (d. 1938)
  - Giovanni Papini, Italian essayist, poet and novelist (d. 1956)
- January 13 – Essington Lewis, Australian industrialist (d. 1961)
- January 15 – John Rodgers, American naval officer, naval aviation pioneer (d. 1926)
- January 23 – Luisa Casati, Italian heiress, artistic muse and patron of the arts (d. 1957)
- January 26 – Henry Wadsworth Longfellow Dana, American academic and activist (d. 1950)
- January 30 – Whitford Kane, Irish-born American actor (d. 1956)
- January 31 – Irving Langmuir, American chemist, Nobel Prize laureate (d. 1957)

=== February ===
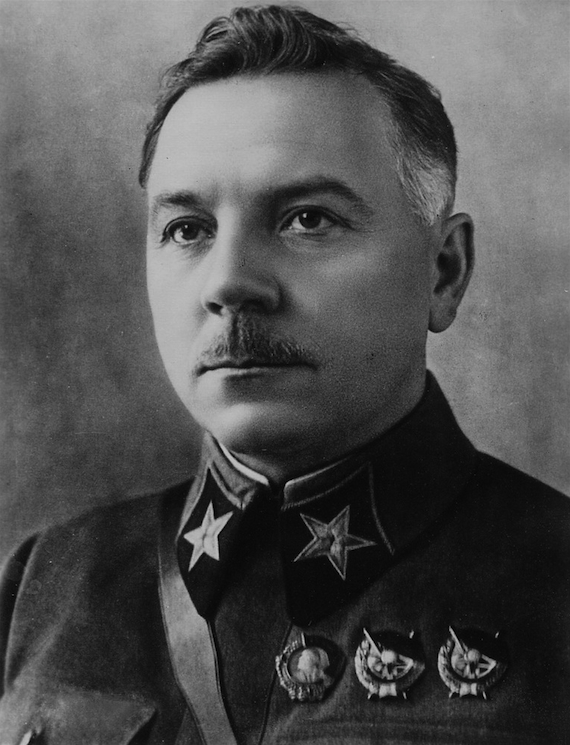
Kliment Voroshilov

- February 2 – Gustav Herglotz, German mathematician (d. 1953)
- February 4
  - Eulalio Gutiérrez, President of Mexico (d. 1939)
  - Fernand Léger, French artist (d. 1955)
  - Kliment Voroshilov, Russian military officer, politician (d. 1969)
- February 11 – Carlo Carrà, Italian painter (d. 1966)
- February 12 – Anna Pavlova, Russian ballerina (d. 1931)
- February 13 – Eleanor Farjeon, English children's writer, poet (d. 1965)
- February 17 – Bess Streeter Aldrich, American fiction writer (d. 1954)
- February 21 – Kenneth J. Alford, British soldier, composer (d. 1945)
- February 25 – Alexei Rykov, Premier of Russia and Premier of the Soviet Union (d. 1938)
- February 27 – Sveinn Björnsson, 1st president of Iceland (d. 1952)
- February 28 – Otto Dowling, United States Navy Captain, 25th Governor of American Samoa (d. 1946)

=== March ===
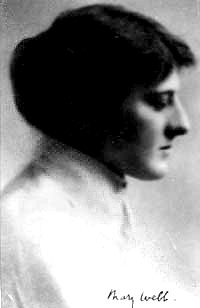
Mary Webb

- March 4
  - T. S. Stribling, American novelist (d. 1965)
  - Richard C. Tolman, American mathematical physicist (d. 1948)
- March 9 – Ernest Bevin, British labour leader, politician and statesman (d. 1951)
- March 10 – Thomas Quinlan, English operatic impresario (d. 1951)
- March 17 – Walter Rudolf Hess, Swiss physiologist, Nobel Prize laureate (d. 1973)
- March 22 – Hans Wilsdorf, German-Swiss watchmaker, founder of Rolex (d. 1960)
- March 23
  - Roger Martin du Gard, French writer, Nobel Prize laureate (d. 1958)
  - Hermann Staudinger, German chemist, Nobel Prize laureate (d. 1965)
- March 25
  - Béla Bartók, Hungarian composer (d. 1945)
  - Mary Webb, English novelist (d. 1927)
- March 26 – Guccio Gucci, Italian fashion designer, founder of Gucci (d. 1953)

=== April ===
- April 1 – Octavian Goga, 37th prime minister of Romania (d. 1938)
- April 3 – Alcide De Gasperi, Italian statesman, politician, 30th prime minister of Italy (d. 1954)
- April 12 – Rudolf Ramek, 5th Chancellor of Austria (d. 1941)
- April 14 – Husain Salaahuddin, Maldivian writer (d. 1948)
- April 16 – Edward Wood, 1st Earl of Halifax, British politician (d. 1959)
- April 24 – Harald Giersing, Danish painter (d. 1927)
- April 26 – Friedrich Johannes Hugo von Engelken, Director of the United States Mint from 1916 to 1917 (d. 1930)
- April 27 – Móric Esterházy, 18th prime minister of Hungary (d. 1960)

=== May ===
- May 1 – Mary MacLane, Canadian writer (d. 1929)
- May 2 – Harry J. Capehart, American lawyer, politician, and businessperson (d. 1955)
- May 4 – Alexander Kerensky, Russian politician (d. 1970)
- May 13 – Lima Barreto, Brazilian writer (d. 1922)
- May 14 – George Murray Hulbert, American politician (d. 1950)
- May 19 – Mustafa Kemal Atatürk, founder of the Republic of Turkiye and the first President of Turkey, Turkish field marshal and statesman (official birthday; d. 1938)
- May 20 – Władysław Sikorski, Polish general, politician (d. 1943)
- May 26 – Adolfo de la Huerta, 38th President of Mexico (d. 1955)
- May 30 – Georg von Küchler, German field marshal (d. 1968)

=== June ===
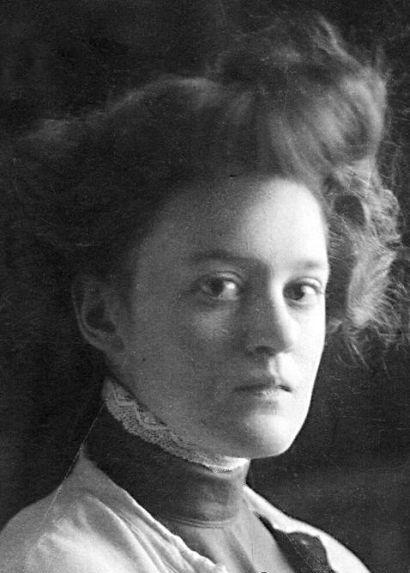
Maggie Gripenberg

- June 3 – Juliusz Rómmel, Polish general (d. 1967)
- June 9 – Marion Leonard, American silent film actress (d. 1956)
- June 11 – Maggie Gripenberg, Finnish dancer and choreographer (d. 1976)
- June 17 – Tommy Burns, Canadian boxer (d. 1955)

=== July ===
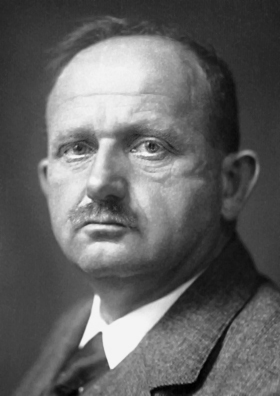
Hans Fischer

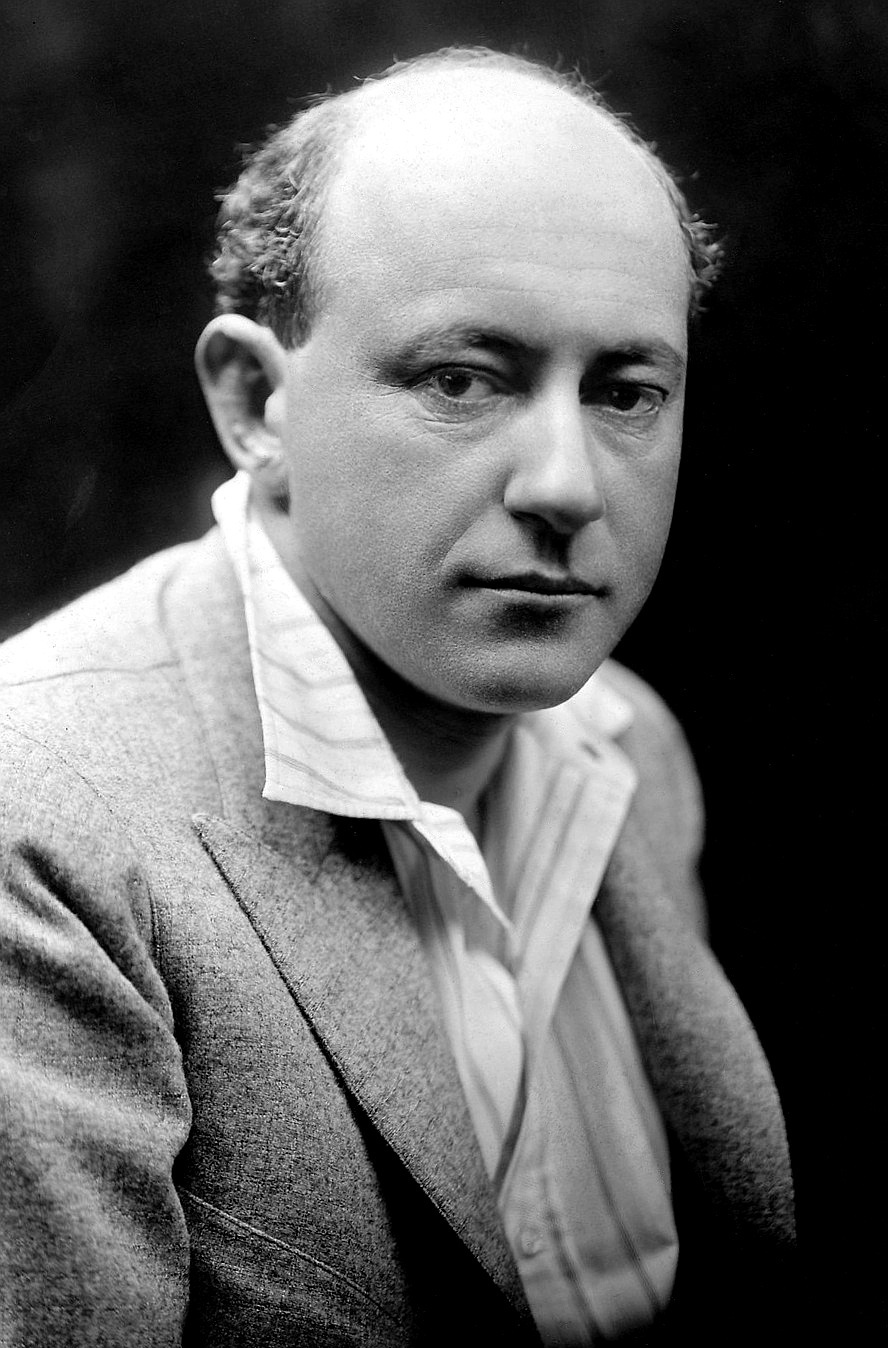
Cecil B. DeMille

- July 3 – Leon Errol, Australian actor and comedian (d. 1951)
- July 4 – Ulysses S. Grant III, American soldier, planner (d. 1968)
- July 6 – Leo Bagrow, Russian-born historian of cartography (d. 1957)
- July 22 – Kenneth Whiting, United States Navy officer, submarine and naval aviation pioneer (d. 1943)
- July 27 – Hans Fischer, German chemist, Nobel Prize laureate (d. 1945)
- July 28 – Günther Quandt, German industrialist, founder of the industrial empire that in modern times includes BMW and Altana (d. 1954)
- July 30 – Smedley Butler, United States Marine Corps general (d. 1940)

=== August ===
- August 6 – Sir Alexander Fleming, Scottish biomedical researcher, recipient of the Nobel Prize in Physiology or Medicine (d. 1955)
- August 7 – François Darlan, French admiral and 81st prime minister of France from 1941 to 1942 (d. 1942)
- August 8 – Paul Ludwig Ewald von Kleist, German field marshal (b. 1954)
- August 12 – Cecil B. DeMille, American film director, producer (d. 1959)
- August 19 – George Enescu, Romanian composer (d. 1955)
- August 20 – Edgar A. Guest, English poet (d. 1959)
- August 25 – Émile Aubrun French aviator (d. 1967)

=== September ===
- September 5
  - Otto Bauer, Austrian Social Democratic politician (d. 1938)
  - Henry Maitland Wilson, British field marshal (d. 1964)
- September 8
  - Harry Hillman, American track athlete (d. 1945)
  - Refik Saydam, 4th prime minister of Turkey (d. 1942)
- September 11 – Asta Nielsen, Danish silent film star (d. 1972)
- September 12 – Daniel Jones, British phonetician (d. 1967)
- September 15 – Ettore Bugatti, Italian car designer, founder of Bugatti (d. 1947)
- September 16 – Clive Bell, English art critic (d. 1964)
- September 17 – Aubrey Faulkner, South African cricketer (d. 1930)
- September 25
  - Tullo Morgagni, Italian journalist, sports race organizer, and aviation enthusiast (d. 1919)
  - Lu Xun, leading figure of modern Chinese literature (d. 1936)
- September 26 – Hiram Wesley Evans, American Ku Klux Klan Imperial Wizard (d. 1966)
- September 29 – Ludwig von Mises, Austrian economist (d. 1973)

=== October ===
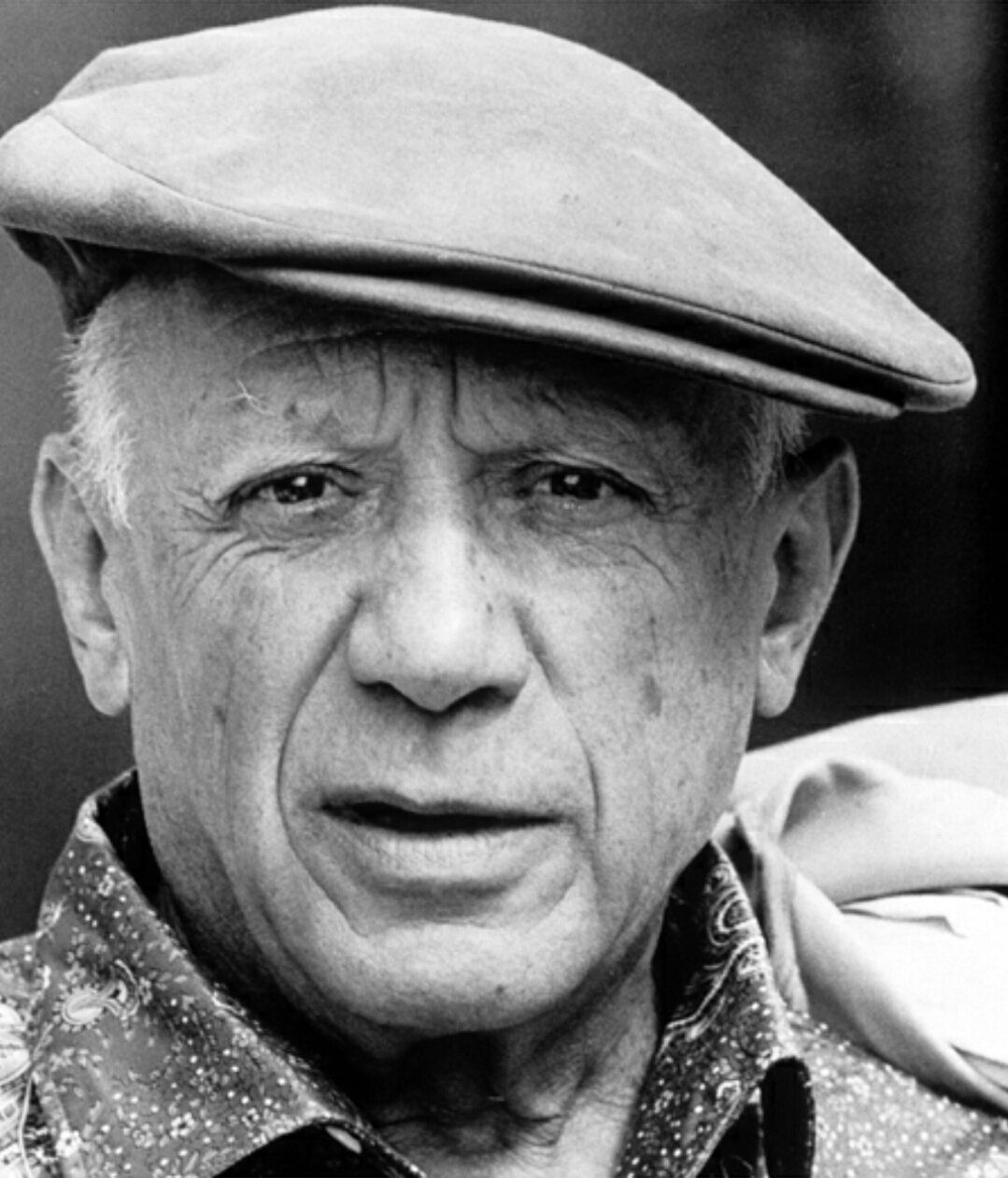
Pablo Picasso

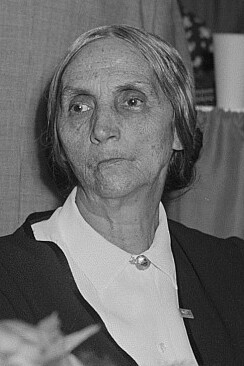
Eugénie Cotton

- October 1
  - William E. Boeing, American engineer, airplane manufacturer (d. 1956)
  - Kanichiro Tashiro, Japanese general (d. 1937)
- October 2 – Pannalal Bose, Indian educationist, first Education Minister of West Bengal, translated Rabindranath Tagore's ক্ষুধিত পাষাণ (Khudto Pashan) into The Hungry Stone (d. 1956)
- October 4 – Walther von Brauchitsch, German field marshal (d. 1948)
- October 6 – Kiyoshi Katsuki, Japanese general (d. 1950)
- October 11 – Hans Kelsen, Austrian legal theorist (d. 1973)
- October 13 – Eugénie Cotton, French physicist, socialist, women's rights advocate (d. 1967)
- October 15
  - William Temple, English Archbishop of Canterbury (d. 1944)
  - P. G. Wodehouse, English-born comic writer (d. 1975)
- October 22 – Clinton Davisson, American physicist, Nobel Prize laureate (d. 1958)
- October 25 – Pablo Picasso, Spanish painter (d. 1973)
- October 26 – Margaret Wycherly, English stage, film actress (d. 1956)

=== November ===
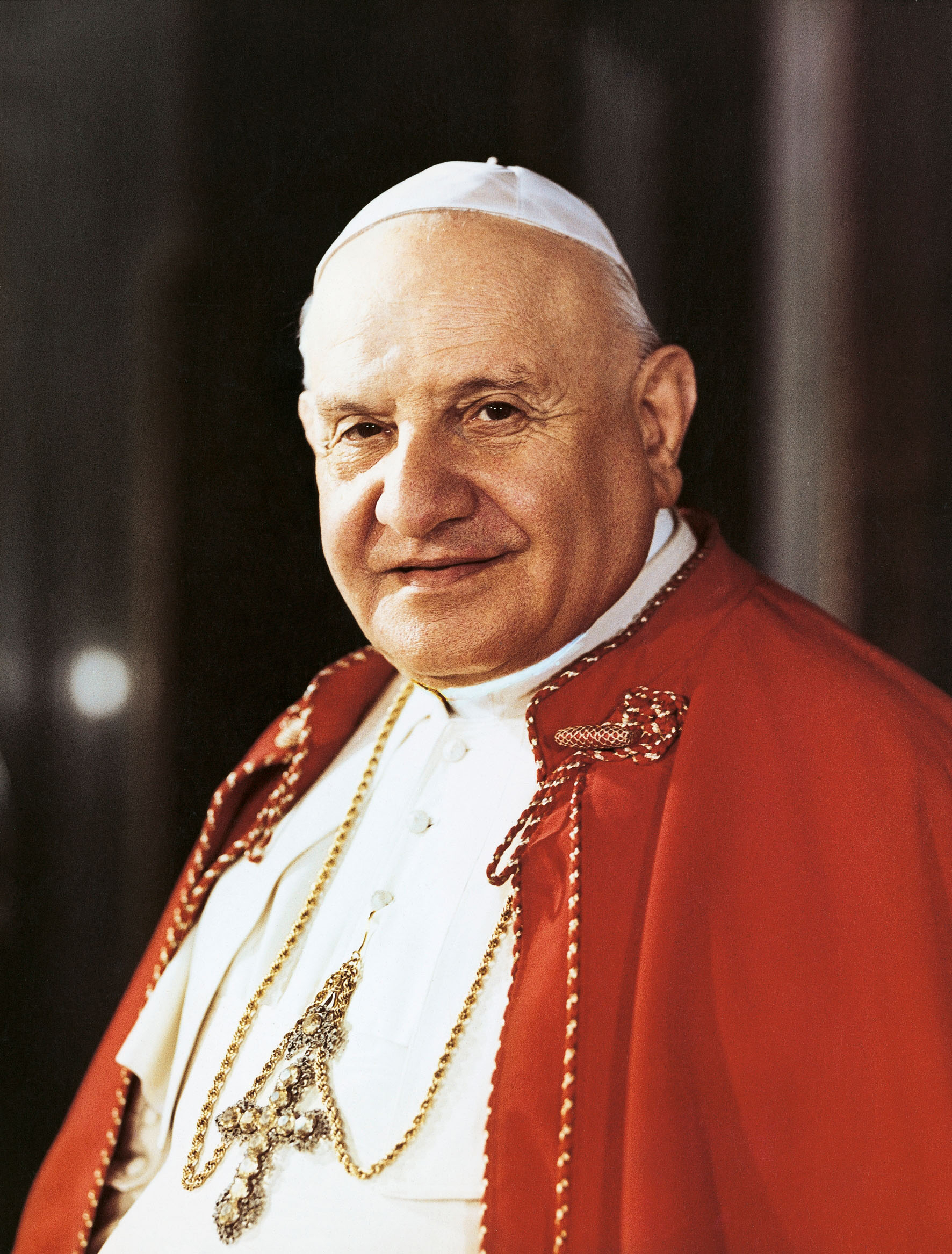
Pope John XXIII

- November 4 – Gaby Deslys, French dancer, actress (d. 1920)
- November 5 – George A. Malcolm, American lawyer, Associate Justice of the Supreme Court of the Philippines and educator (d. 1961)
- November 8 – Robert Esnault-Pelterie, French aircraft designer, pioneer rocket theorist (d. 1957)
- November 12 – Maximilian von Weichs, German field marshal (d. 1954)
- November 14 – Nicholas Schenck, Russian-born American film studio executive (d. 1969)
- November 15 – Franklin P. Adams, American columnist, poet (d. 1960)
- November 24
  - Al Christie, Canadian-born director, producer (d. 1951)
  - Ye Gongchuo, Chinese politician, poet, and calligrapher (d. 1968)
- November 25
  - Jacob Fichman, Romanian-born Israeli poet, essayist (d. 1958)
  - Pope John XXIII (b. Angelo Roncalli), Italian pontiff (1958–1963) (d. 1963)
- November 28 – Stefan Zweig, Austrian writer (d. 1942)

=== December ===
- December 2 – Heinrich Barkhausen, German physicist (d. 1956)
- December 3 – Henry Fillmore, American composer, bandleader (d. 1956)
- December 8 – Tuomas Bryggari, Finnish politician (d. 1964)
- December 16 – Henri Dentz, French general (d. 1945)
- December 23 – Juan Ramón Jiménez, Spanish writer, Nobel Prize laureate (d. 1958)
- December 25 – John Dill, British Army field marshal (d. 1944)
- December 30 – Wiktor Thommée, Polish general (d. 1962)

== Deaths ==
=== January–June ===
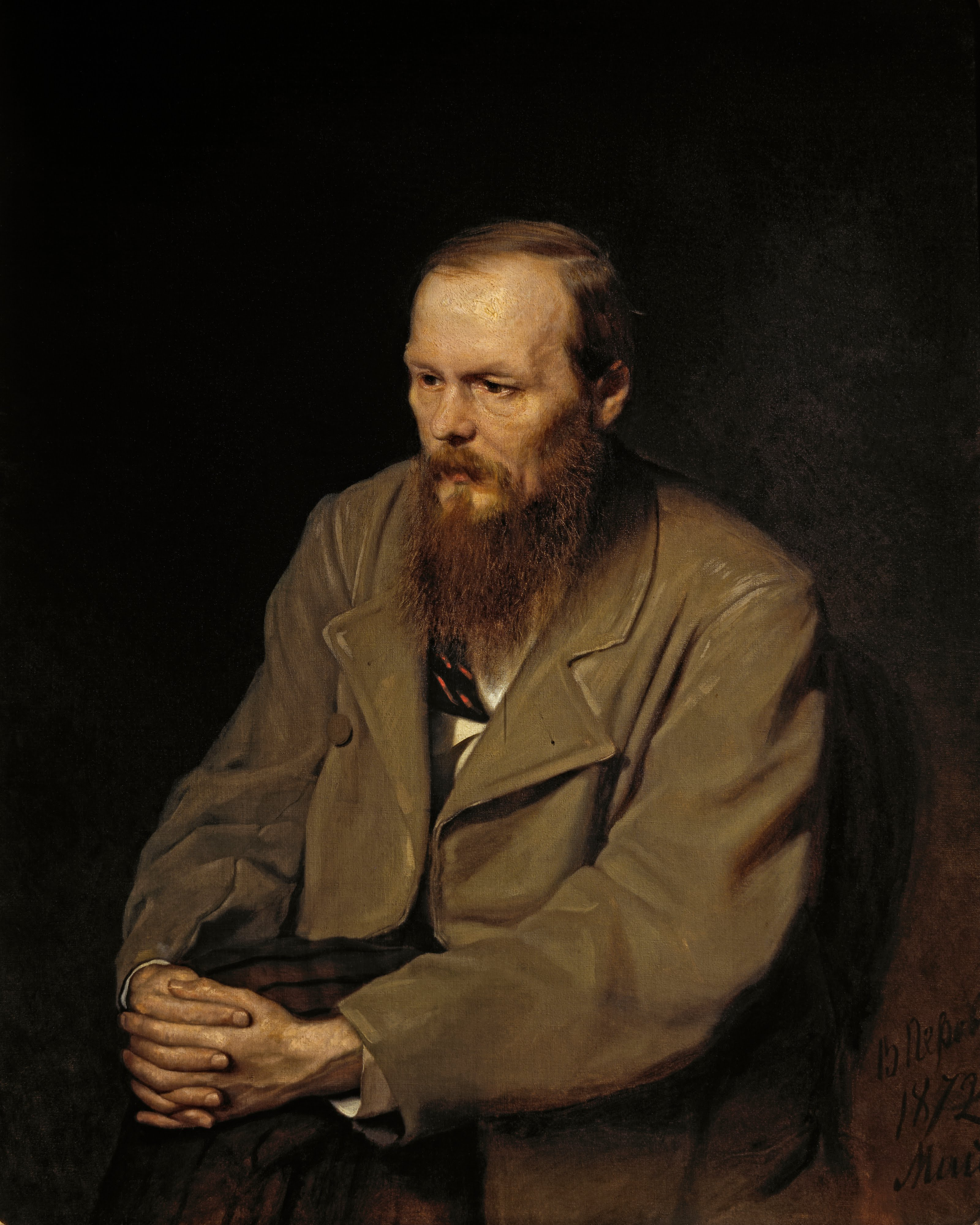
Fyodor Dostoyevsky

Anna McNeill Whistler

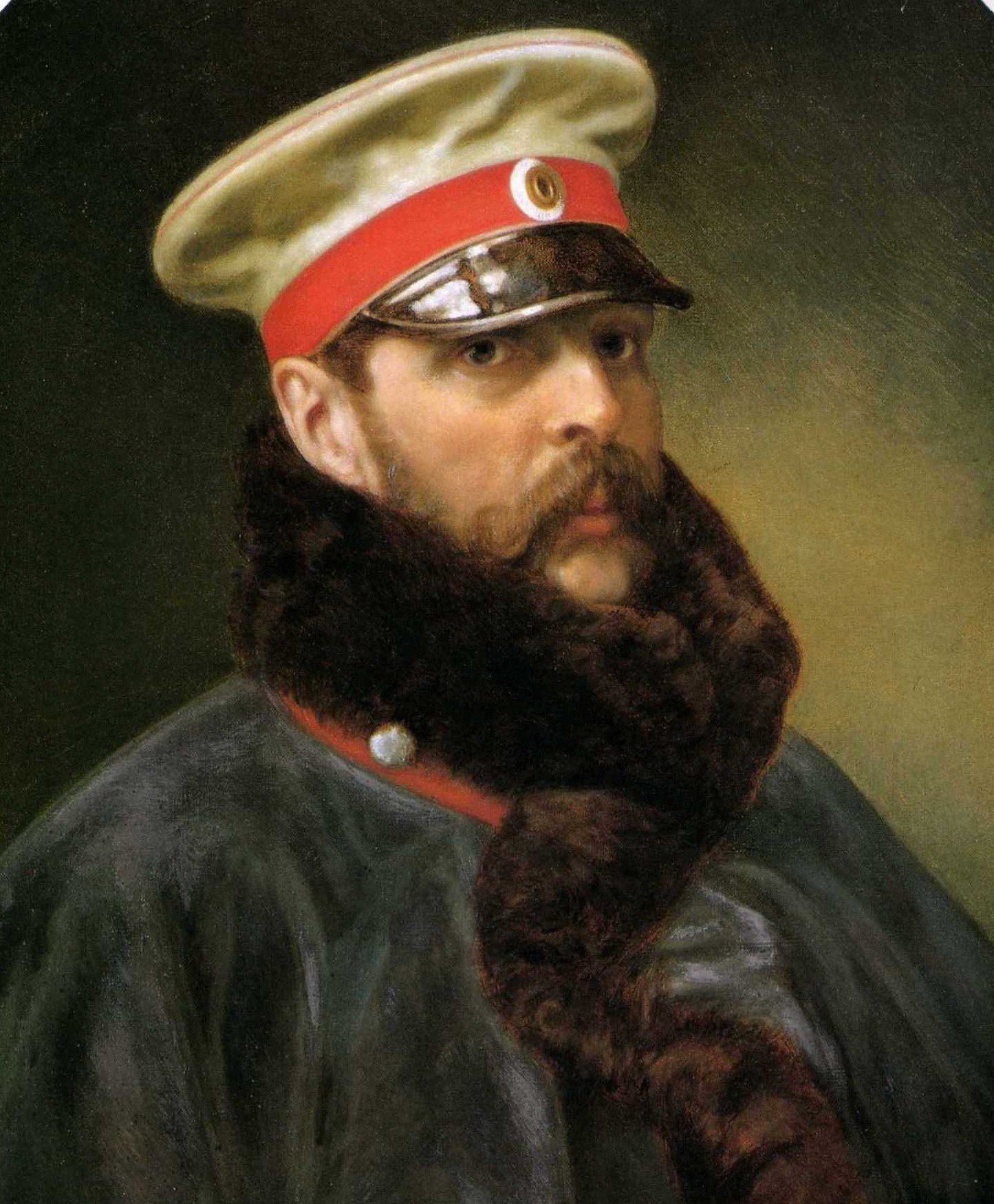
Alexander II of Russia

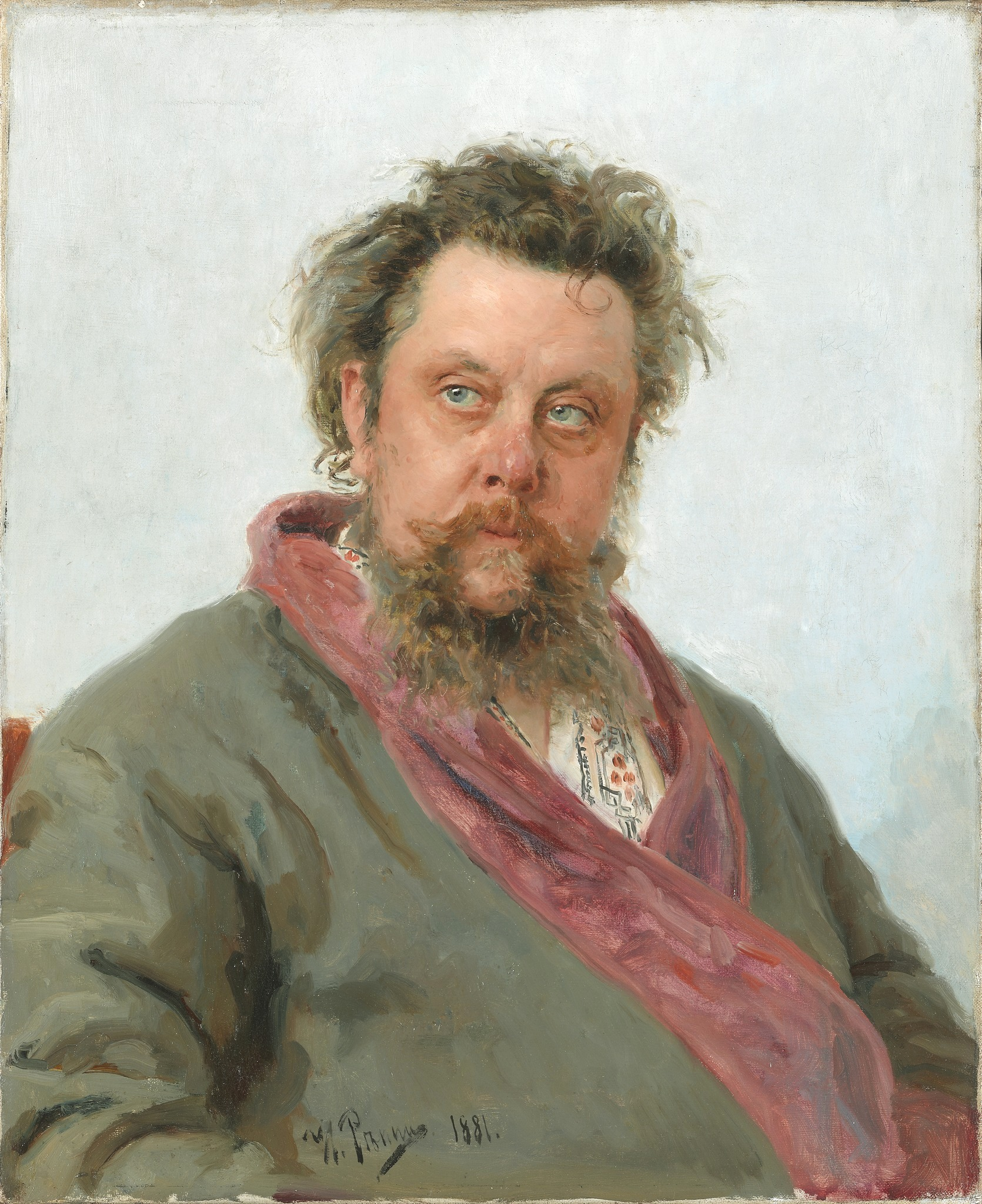
Modest Mussorgsky

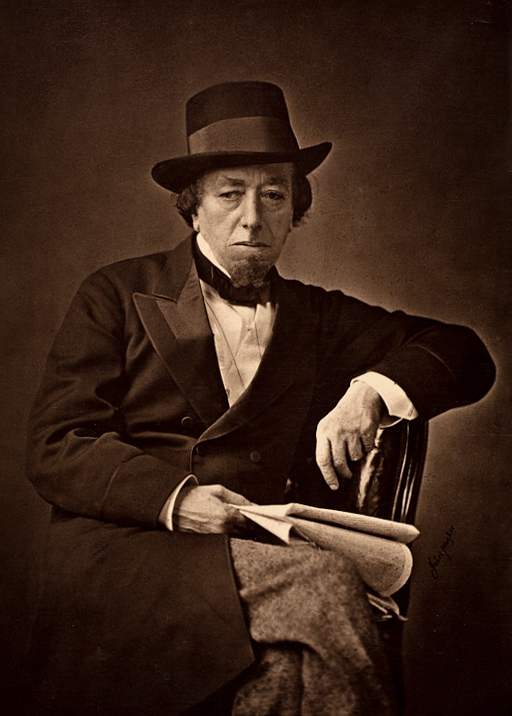
Benjamin Disraeli

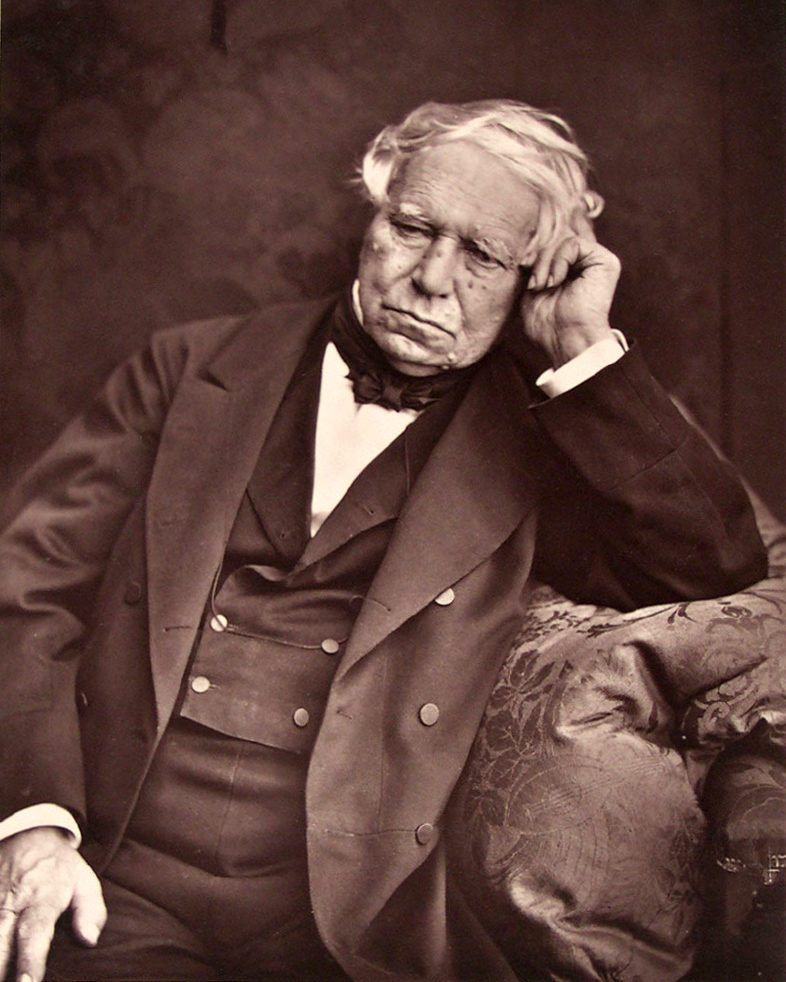
Jules Armand Dufaure

- January 1 – Louis Auguste Blanqui, French socialist, political activist (b. 1805)
- January 3 – Anna McNeill Whistler, James Whistler's mother, subject of his painting (b. 1804)
- January 18 – Auguste Mariette, French Egyptologist (b. 1821)
- January 21 – Wilhelm Matthias Naeff, member of the Swiss Federal Council (b. 1802)
- January 24 – Frances Stackhouse Acton, British botanist, archaeologist, writer and artist (b. 1794)
- February 5 – Thomas Carlyle, Scottish writer, historian (b. 1795)
- February 6 – Pieter Mijer, Governor-General of the Dutch East Indies (b. 1812)
- February 8 – Marie Jules Dupré, French admiral and colonial governor (b. 1813)
- February 9 – Fyodor Dostoyevsky, Russian novelist (b. 1821)
- February 14 – Fernando Wood, New York City mayor (b. 1812)
- February 23 – Robert F. R. Lewis, American naval officer (b. 1826)
- March 2 – Sir John Cracroft Wilson, British civil servant, and politician in New Zealand (b. 1808)
- March 13 – Emperor Alexander II of Russia (assassinated) (b. 1818)
- March 28 – Modest Mussorgsky, Russian composer (b. 1839)
- March 31 – Lucy Virginia French, American blank verse poet (b. 1825)
- April 19 – Benjamin Disraeli, Prime Minister of the United Kingdom (b. 1804)
- April 26 – Ludwig Freiherr von und zu der Tann-Rathsamhausen, Bavarian general (b. 1815)
- April 27 – Ludwig von Benedek, Austrian general (b. 1804)
- May 14 – Mary Seacole, British nurse (b. 1805)
- May 24 – Samuel Palmer, English artist (b. 1805)
- May 25 – Giuseppe Maria Giulietti, Italian explorer (b. 1847)
- June 6 – Henri Vieuxtemps, Belgian composer (b. 1820)
- June 28 – Jules Armand Dufaure, 3-time prime minister of France (b. 1798)
- June 30 – Gustav von Alvensleben, Prussian general (b. 1803)

=== July – December ===
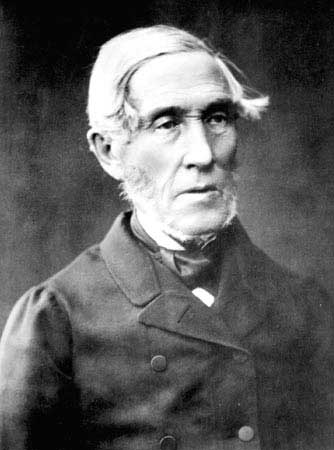
J. V. Snellman

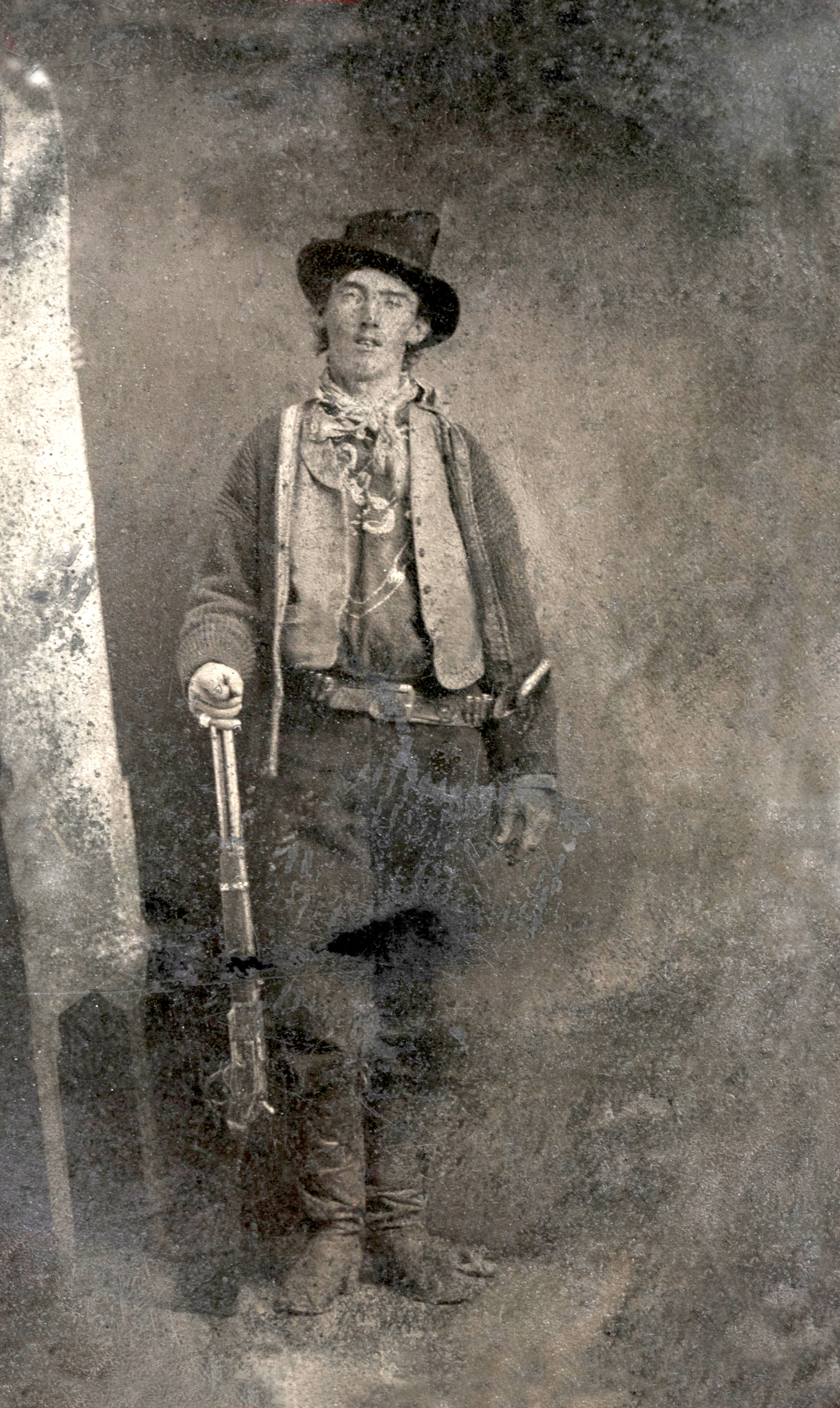
Billy the Kid

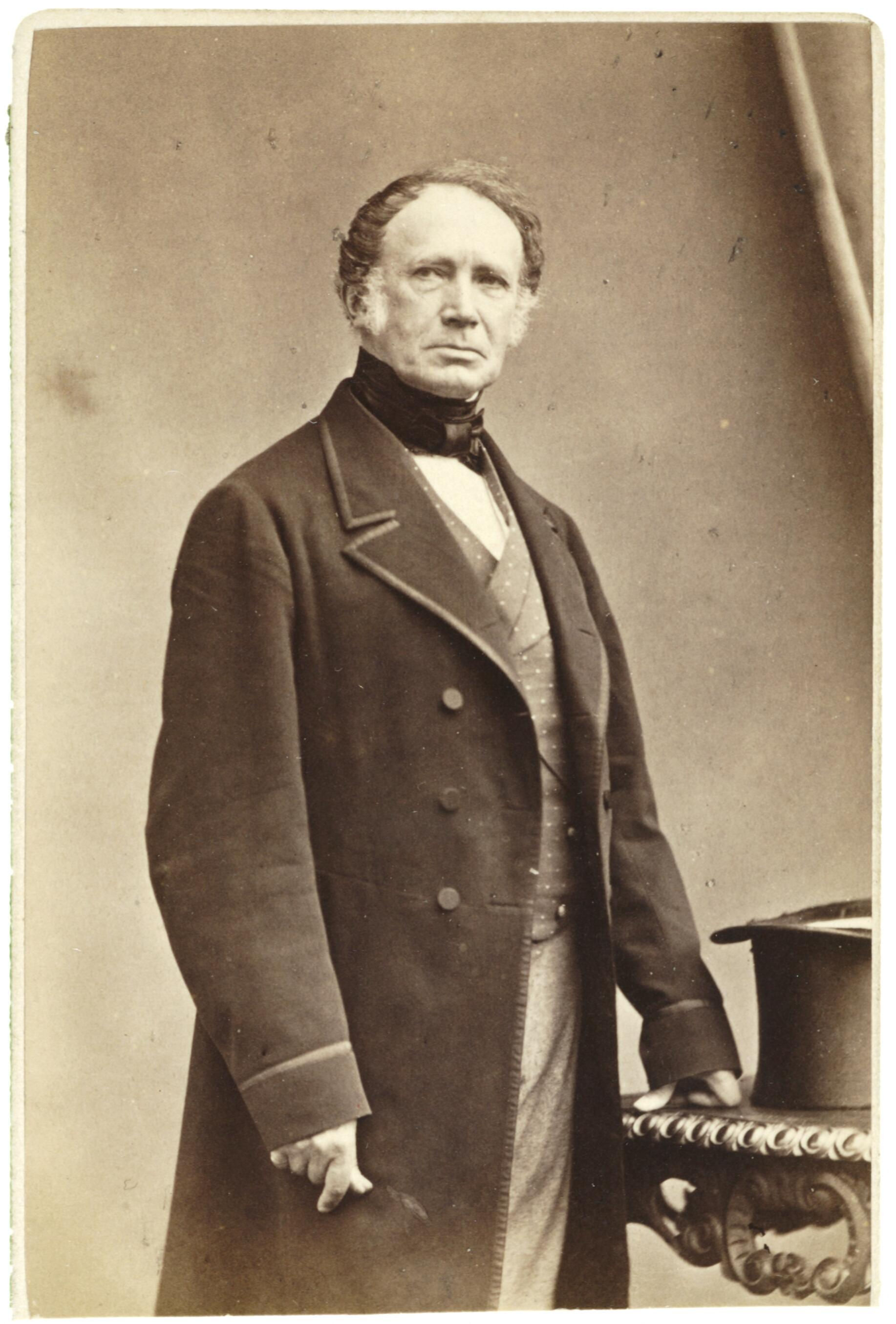
Prince Frederick of the Netherlands

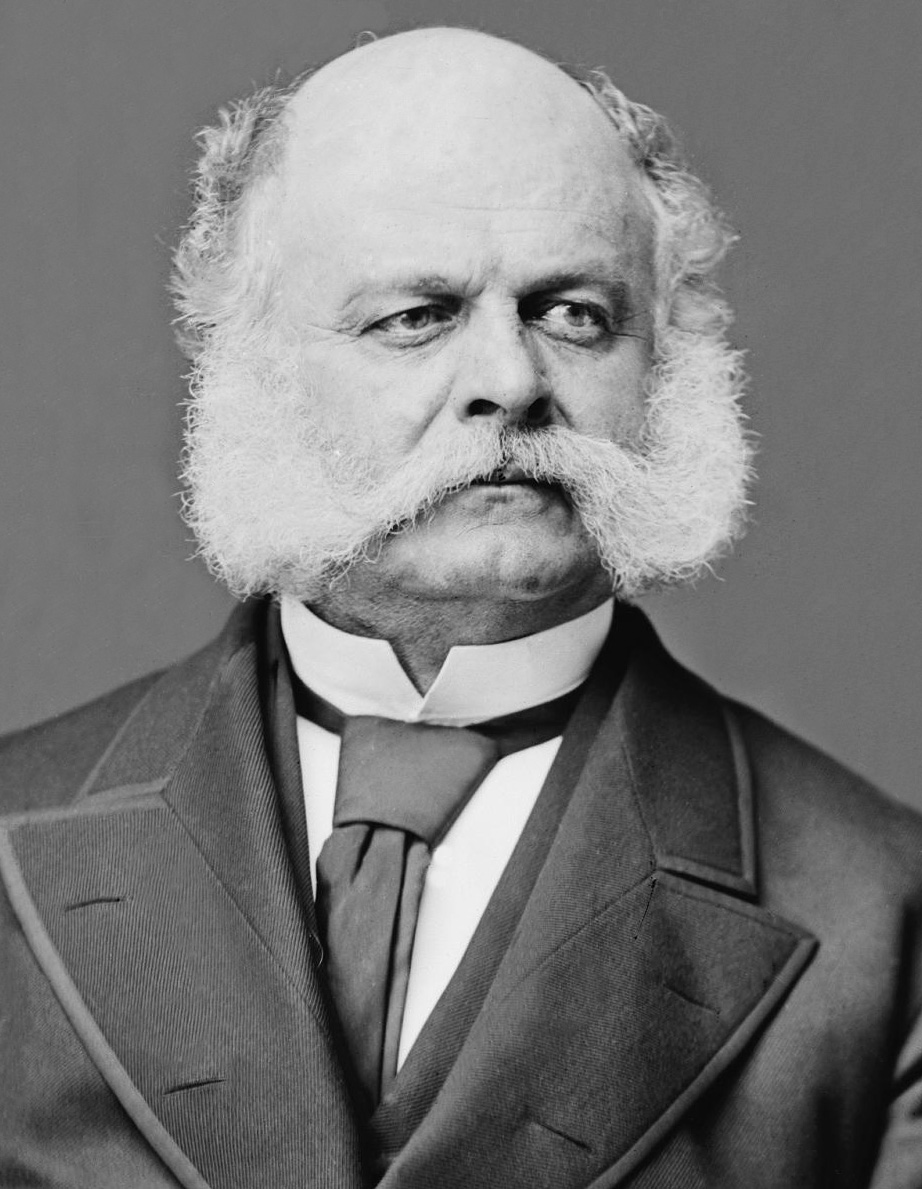
Ambrose Burnside

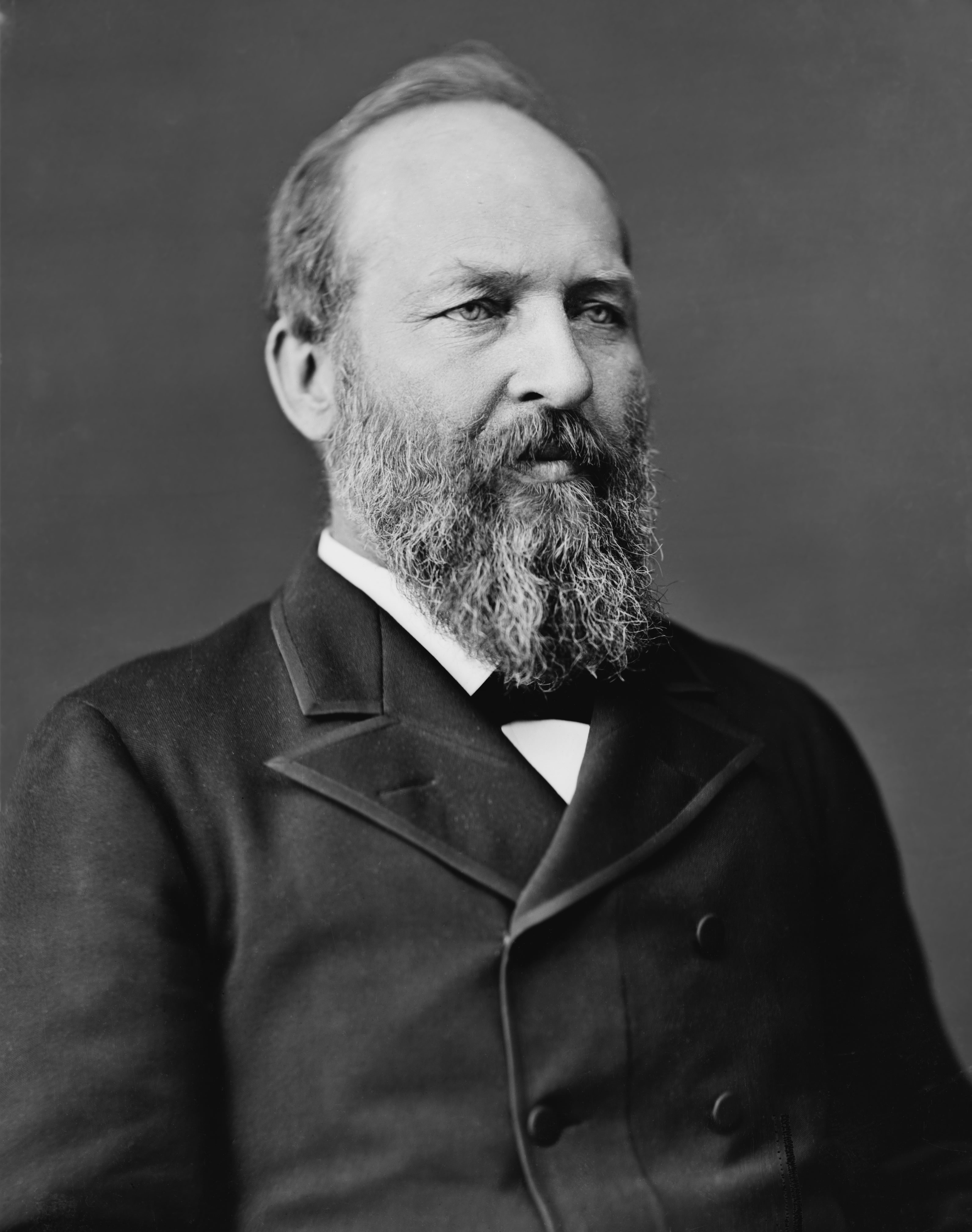
James A. Garfield

- July 1
  - Baron Jules Dupotet de Sennevoy, French writer (b. 1796)
  - Hermann Lotze, German philosopher and logician (b. 1817)
- July 4 – J. V. Snellman, Finnish statesman and an influential Fennoman philosopher (b. 1806)
- July 14 – Billy the Kid, American gunslinger (b. 1859)
- July 17 – Jim Bridger, American explorer and trapper (b. 1804)
- August 3 – William Fargo, American expressman and politician, Mayor of Buffalo, New York (b. 1818)
- August 11 – Jane Digby, English adventurer (b. 1807)
- August 15 – Alexandru G. Golescu, 11th prime minister of Romania (b. 1819)
- September 7 – Sidney Lanier, American writer (b. 1842)
- September 8 – Prince Frederick of the Netherlands, Dutch noble, general (b. 1797)
- September 13 – Ambrose Burnside, American Civil War general, inventor, politician from Rhode Island (b. 1824)
- September 19 – James A. Garfield, 20th President of the United States (b. 1831)
- September 22 – Solomon L. Spink, U.S. Congressman from Illinois (b. 1831)
- October 3
  - Orson Pratt, American religious leader (b. 1811)
  - Princess Sumiko, Japanese princess (b. 1829)
- October 31 – George W. De Long, American naval officer, explorer (starvation) (b. 1844)
- December 4 – Hugh Judson Kilpatrick, American general, politician, and diplomat (b. 1836)
- December 18 – George Edmund Street, British architect (b. 1824)

== See also ==
- Upside down year
