= Between Peasants =

Work by Errico Malatesta

- Author: Errico Malatesta
- Original title: Fra Contadini: Dialogo sull'anarchia
- Language: Italian
- Subject: Anarchy
- Genre: Political philosophy
- Published: 1883-1884
- Publication place: Italy

Between Peasants: A Dialogue on Anarchy (Italian: Fra Contadini: Dialogo sull'anarchia) is an anarchist dialogue written in 1884 by Errico Malatesta. The work, the most famous of Malatesta's literary productions, presents a conversation between two peasants, Berto and Giorgio, on the topic of anarchy.

In this text, Malatesta develops several aspects of his thought, including his staunch opposition to reformism and his preference for propagandists and anarchists to use simple and comprehensible formulas rather than grand theoretical ideas. The author also defends the concept of use property in place of private property. It has been translated into at least twelve languages.

== History ==
Malatesta wrote his essay in 1883–1884 during a severe economic crisis affecting the Italian rural economy, caused by the importation of American and Russian cereals into the Italian market. The text was also written in response to the development of the "legalitarian" path, promoted by the government and Italian social democrats. The revolutionary thus reacted to reformism.

The essay was translated into a dozen languages following its publication.

== Contents ==
Malatesta chose the dialogue form because it allowed him to present anarchism in a simple way, without the reader realizing it. The method employed is akin to a near-Socratic method.

The work depicts a conversation between two peasants, Berto and Giorgio. The first, Berto, is younger and more politically engaged, while Giorgio is older and less politicized. In the text, the two engage in dialogue, with Berto gradually convincing his elder to embrace anarchism. In one of the essay's most striking passages, Berto responds to his interlocutor's questions about how to recognize a socialist, a reaction to the rise of reformist socialism:

When someone tells you they are a socialist, ask them if they are willing to take property from those who own it and put it in common for everyone. If the answer is yes, embrace them as a brother; if it is no, be cautious, for you have an enemy before you.

In another passage, Berto declares that he does not wish to hear about complicated ideas, reflecting his aspirations for other anarchists and propagandists. Malatesta also defends the concept of use property over private property, arguing that small farmers should not be expropriated but rather allowed to keep their fields, provided they actually work them.

== Legacy ==
Between Peasants became Malatesta's most famous and widely read work, alongside other texts such as Anarchy. The work is considered a "true paradigm of anarchist thought", according to Ángel J. Cappelletti.
