= Marie Le Compte =

American journal editor and anarchist

- Occupation: Journalist
- Known for: Anarchism

Plaque honoring Le Compte for 100elles in Geneva

Marie Le Compte was an American journal editor and anarchist who was active during the early 1880s.

== Early career ==
Marie Le Compte was of French origin but settled in the United States, where she joined the Socialist movement, speaking and writing for that cause. Le Compte was a friend of John Swinton. She was an editor and a writer for Joseph Patrick McDonnell's New York Labor Standard. According to Paul Avrich she was "an exotic and somewhat mysterious figure" with "a special sympathy for outlaws and tramps." She called herself "Miss Le Compte, Prolétaire".

== 1881 Anarchist conference ==
Marie Le Compte attended the July 1881 London Social Revolutionary Congress. By this time she was middle-aged. She represented the "Boston Revolutionaries", an obscure group of whom little is known. Other delegates included Peter Kropotkin, Errico Malatesta, Saverio Merlino, Louise Michel and Émile Gautier. While respecting "complete autonomy of local groups" the congress defined propaganda actions that all could follow and agreed that "propaganda by the deed" was the path to social revolution.

The Radical of 23 July 1881 reported that the congress met on 18 July 1881 at the Cleveland Hall, Fitzroy Square, with speeches by Marie Le Compte, "the transatlantic agitator", Louise Michel, and Kropotkin. In addressing the congress Le Compte said that revolutionaries should join labor unions in order to radicalize the members. She supported the idea of having bomb-making manuals published in many languages by local groups. During her visit to England Le Compte and Kropotkin gave talks to the Homerton Social Democratic Club and to the Stratford Radical and Dialectical Club. At the Homerton club her topic was "the situation in America". In October 1881 she gave a talk at Stratford, London, in which she praised pirates.

== Later career ==
Benjamin Tucker's Liberty was the first Anarchist paper in the English language to circulate in England. Marie Le Compte may have introduced it during her 1881 visit. She wrote several articles for the paper in 1883 reporting on the trial and imprisonment at Lyon of several anarchists, including Louise Michel, Émile Pouget and Kropotkin. In March 1883 she participated in the Paris bread riot and was wounded in a fight with the police. She fled to Switzerland to avoid being arrested. She settled in Berne where she translated Bakunin's God and the State and Kropotkin's Appeal to the Young.

Marie Le Compte ceased to participate in the movement some time after 1883. Her translation of Kropotkin's An Appeal to the Young was serialized from 5–26 January 1884 in the San Francisco Truth. The first number of The Anarchist published in 1885 in London by Henry Seymour held an announcement of a translation by Le Compte of Mikhail Bakunin's God and the State. The International Publishing Company announced that the profits from God & The State would go to the Red Cross of the Russian Revolutionary Party.
