= Anarchy (essay) =

1884 and 1891 essay by Errico Malatesta

- Author: Errico Malatesta
- Original title: L'anarchia
- Language: Italian
- Subject: Anarchy
- Genre: Political philosophy
- Published: 1884 (first version); 1891 (final version)
- Publisher: Freedom
- Publication place: United Kingdom
- Text: Anarchy (essay) at Wikisource

Anarchy or L'anarchia is an anarchist essay written in 1884 and revised in 1891 by Errico Malatesta. In this text, the Italian revolutionary presented key anarchist theories and methods to his audience. He also argued against Marxism and individualist anarchism and responded to Kropotkin's views. Malatesta used the text to support the idea of organizations being able to coordinate direct action and shared methods, more than theory, to support his views.

The work was one of the most widely read anarchist publications in history, circulating extensively and being translated into numerous languages.

== History ==
The text was initially written in Italian in a first version in 1884. It was then republished between 1891 and 1892 in a revised English translation. This translation appeared in the British anarchist monthly Freedom and was republished the following year. In 1973 and 1994, new English translations from the 1891-1892 Italian were produced, which are considered to be more accurate than the initial translation.

It is one of the best-selling anarchist books in history and one of the seminal works of Malatesta's thought. Moreover, it was exported abroad, such as to South America, where it became a generalistic anarchist reference. However, for Malatesta himself, this wasn't his favorite text.

It was translated in Chinese in 1907 by Zhang Li and in Japanese around the same time.

== Contents ==
There is a significant variation between the first text published by the author in 1884 and the second version of the text. In this second version, Malatesta evolved in his positions; he no longer explicitly refers to anarchist communism and avoids defining anarchy too precisely, preferring instead to maintain a general framework of thought to avoid overly restricting his subject. For him, it is more about presenting anarchist methods than an ideal and theoretical solution to the problems addressed by anarchy.

In the text, Malatesta starts by developing a theory of the State, to introduce his next points:

Anarchists, including this writer, have used the word State, and still do, to mean the sum total of the political, legislative, judiciary, military, and financial institutions through which the management of their own affairs, the control over their personal behavior, and the responsibility for their personal safety are taken away from the people and entrusted to others who, by usurpation or delegation, are vested with the powers to make the laws for everything and everybody, and to oblige the people to observe them, if need be, by the use of collective force.

More generally, Malatesta opposes the idea of viewing the State as a moderating and neutral force in social conflicts. For him, this notion is an illusion, as the state would always be under the control of a faction.

The book was written in reaction to Marxism and individualist anarchism and argued that anarchists should find themselves in organizations or parties made to coordinate direct action.

Although Malatesta disagreed with some of Kropotkin's ideas, this text was still influenced by Kropotkin's impact on his thought. In it, Malatesta offered several definitions of anarchy, including one as "the state of a people who govern themselves without constituted authorities, without government". He also argued that "anarchy is both an ultimate goal and, in part, a state of affairs with universal value", according to Jacques Ghiloni.
