= Francesco Saverio Merlino =

Italian lawyer (1856–1930)

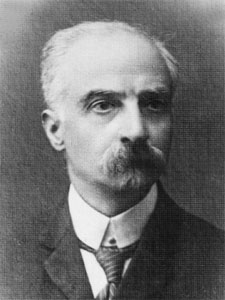
- Born: 9 September 1856; Naples, Kingdom of the Two Sicilies
- Died: 30 June 1930 (aged 73); Rome, Italy
- Occupation: Lawyer
- Known for: Libertarian socialism

Francesco Saverio Merlino (9 September 1856 – 30 June 1930) was an Italian lawyer, anarchist activist and theorist of libertarian socialism. During his law studies at the University of Naples Federico II, Merlino joined the International Workingmen's Association, supporting its anarchist wing. He went on to join other anarchist organizations and support their militant movement for more than twenty years. In 1886 he was forced into exile in England interspersed with some trips to the United States In 1894 he returned to Italy, where he served two years in prison. At the end of the 19th century, after long disputes with his friend Errico Malatesta about the relationship between anarchism and democracy, Merlino abandoned anarchist ideas to become a theorist of libertarian socialism.

== Life ==
Merlino was born on 9 September 1856 in Naples. He was raised in the Neapolitan anarchist tradition. Merlino started to participate in the militant anarchist movement in Italy during his university studies.

Merlino attended the Anarchist Congress that met in London from 14 July 1881. Other delegates included Peter Kropotkin, Errico Malatesta, Marie Le Compte, Louise Michel and Émile Gautier. While respecting "complete autonomy of local groups", the congress defined propaganda actions that all could follow and agreed that "propaganda by the deed" was the path to social revolution.

In March 1886, he went into exile in England. Also he travelled to the United States. After he returned to Italy in 1894, he was arrested and had to spend two years in prison.

The Belgian review La Société nouvelle published articles by Merlino in 1891 that took an anarchist viewpoint in criticizing Marxism and German socialism, but Merino also questioned anarchist principles. In 1897, his book Pro e contro il socialismo was published, reflecting his thoughts on the subject. In the following years, he developed his theory of libertarian socialism in arguments with his friend Errico Malatesta.

In 1900, he defended Gaetano Bresci, an Italian-American anarchist who assassinated King Umberto I in response to the Bava-Beccaris massacre. Despite killing the monarch, Bresci was not sentenced to death, making him the only person to ever kill a monarch (without toppling the monarchy) and not be executed.

In 1907, the Turin daily La Stampa published an interview with Merlino, who had recanted his anarchism. The interview, titled "The End of Anarchism", pronounced anarchism an obsolete doctrine, torn by internal disputes, bereft of first-rate theorists and doomed to extinction. Leading Italian-American anarchist Luigi Galleani would attack Merlino in his own article "The End of Anarchism?", adding a question mark. (Note: Avrich, Paul. Sacco and Vanzetti: The Anarchist Background (1991), p. 50)

Merlino died on 30 June 1930 in Rome.

== Major works ==
- Socialismo o monopolismo? (1887)
- L'Italie telle qu'elle est (1890)
- Necessità e basi di un accordo (1892)
- L'individua-lismo nell'anarchismo (1893)
- Pro e contro il socialismo (1897)
- L’utopia collettivista e la crisi del "socialismo scientifico" (1898)
- Formes et essence du socialisme (1898)
- Fascismo e democrazia (1924)
- Politica e Magistratura dal 1860 ad oggi in Italia (1925)
- Il socialismo senza Marx. Studi e polemiche per una revisione della dottrina socialista (1897–1930) – Massimiliano Boni (1974), Bologna
- Il problema economico e politico del socialismo. (1948)
