= Errico Malatesta =

Italian anarchist (1853–1932)

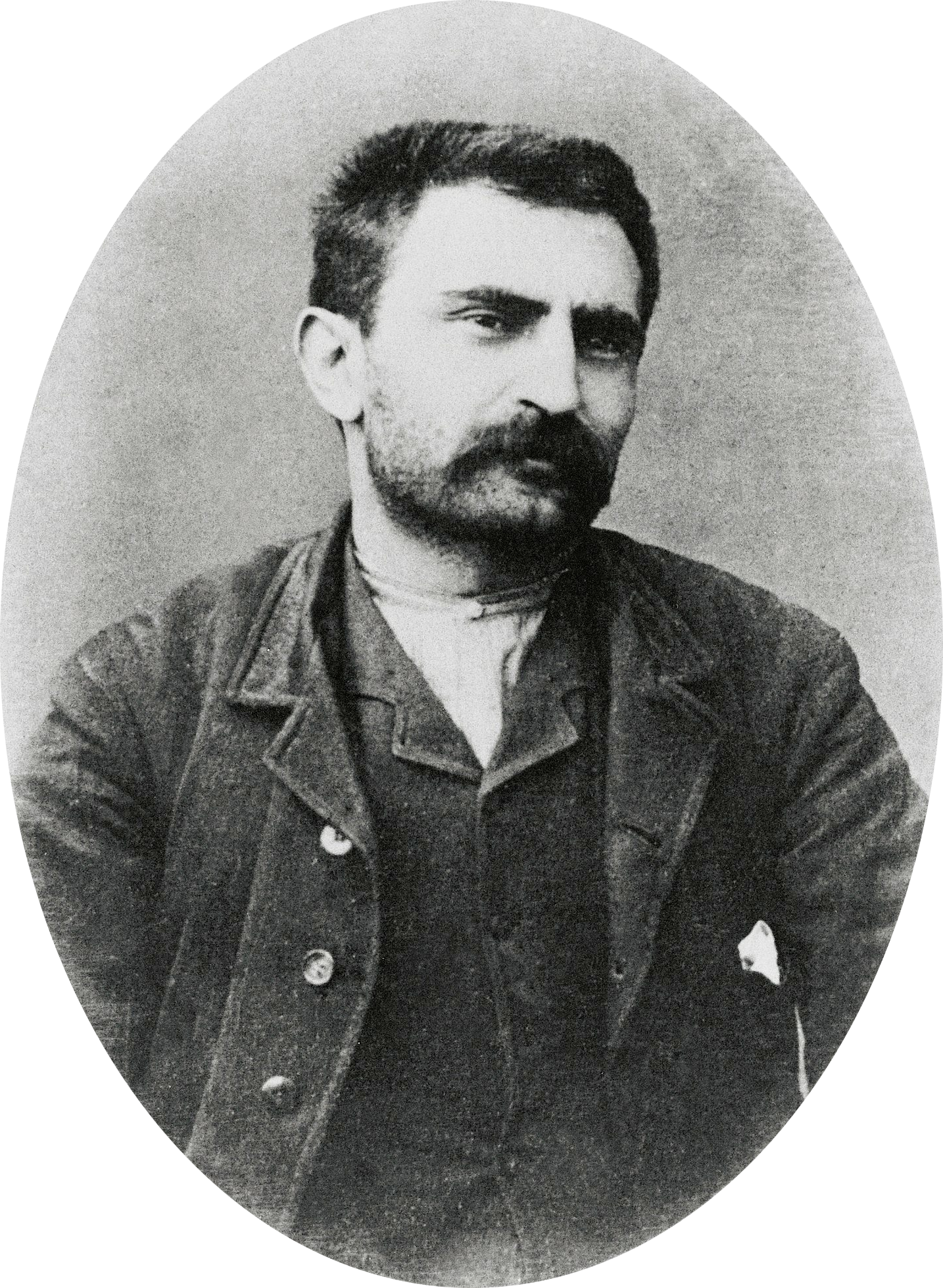
- Malatesta, 1891
- Born: 4 December 1853; Santa Maria Capua Vetere, Kingdom of the Two Sicilies
- Died: 22 July 1932 (aged 78); Rome, Kingdom of Italy
- Occupations: Revolutionary; activist; writer

Philosophical work
- School: Anarcho-communism

Errico Gaetano Maria Pasquale Malatesta (4 December 1853 – 22 July 1932) was an Italian anarchist, theorist and revolutionary socialist. He edited several radical newspapers and spent much of his life exiled and imprisoned, having been jailed and expelled from Italy, Britain, France, and Switzerland. Originally a supporter of insurrectionary propaganda of the deed, Malatesta later advocated for syndicalism. His exiles included five years in Europe and 12 years in Argentina. Throughout his life, Malatesta participated in various insurrections, including an 1895 Spanish revolt and a Belgian general strike. He toured the United States, giving lectures and founding the influential anarchist journal La Questione Sociale. After World War I, he returned to Italy where his newspaper Umanità Nova garnered some popularity before its closure following the rise of Mussolini.

== Biography ==
=== Early years ===
Errico Malatesta was born on 4 December 1853 to a family of middle-class landowners in Santa Maria Maggiore, at the time part of the city of Capua (currently an autonomous municipality renamed Santa Maria Capua Vetere, in the province of Caserta), at the time part of the Kingdom of the Two Sicilies. More distantly, his ancestors ruled Rimini as the House of Malatesta. The first of a long series of arrests came at age fourteen, when he was apprehended for writing an "insolent and threatening" letter to King Victor Emmanuel II.

In April 1877, Malatesta, Carlo Cafiero, Sergey Stepnyak-Kravchinsky and about thirty others started an insurrection in the province of Benevento, taking the villages of Letino and Gallo without a struggle. The revolutionaries burnt tax registers and declared the end of the King's reign and were met with enthusiasm. After leaving Gallo, however, they were arrested by government troops and held

for sixteen months before being acquitted. After Giovanni Passannante's murder attempt on the king Umberto I, the radicals were kept under constant surveillance by the police. Even though the anarchists claimed to have no connection to Passannante, Malatesta, being an advocate of social revolution, was included in this surveillance. After returning to Naples, he was forced to leave Italy altogether in the fall of 1878 because of the intense surveillance, beginning his life in exile.

=== Years of exile ===
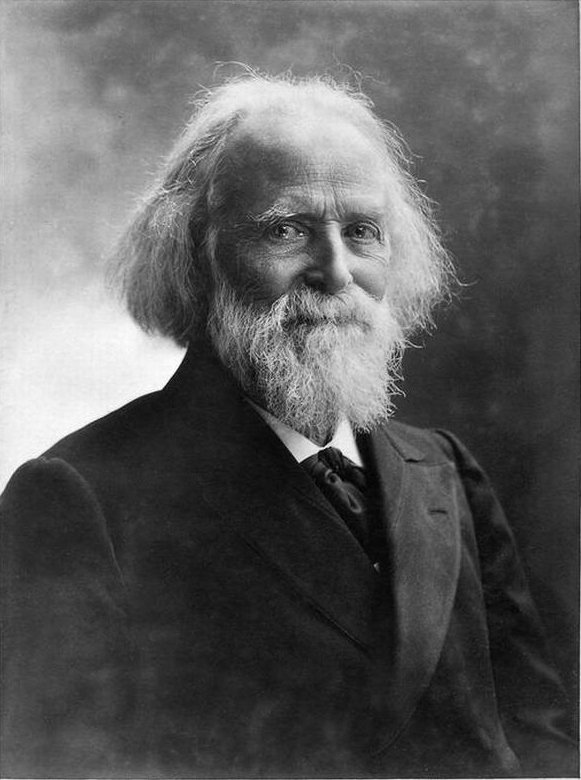
Prominent French anarchist Élisée Reclus, a friend of Malatesta

He went to Egypt briefly, visiting some Italian friends but was soon expelled by the Italian Consul. After working his passage on a French ship and being refused entry to Syria, Turkey and Italy, he landed in Marseille where he made his way to Geneva, Switzerland – then something of an anarchist centre. It was there that he befriended Élisée Reclus and Peter Kropotkin, helping the latter to produce La Révolte. The Swiss respite was brief, however, and after a few months he was expelled from Switzerland, travelling first to Romania before reaching Paris, where he worked briefly as a mechanic.

In 1881, he set out for a new home in London. He would come and go from that city for the next 40 years. There, Malatesta worked as a mechanic. Emilia Tronzio, Malatesta's mistress in the 1870s, was the step-sister of the internationalist Tito Zanardelli. With Malatesta's consent and support she married Giovanni Defendi, who came to stay with Malatesta in London in 1881 after being released from jail.

Malatesta attended the July 1881 Anarchist Congress in London. Other delegates included Peter Kropotkin, Francesco Saverio Merlino, Marie Le Compte, Louise Michel and Émile Gautier. While respecting "complete autonomy of local groups" the congress defined propaganda actions that all could follow and agreed that "propaganda by the deed" was the path to social revolution.

With the outbreak of the Anglo-Egyptian War in 1882, Malatesta organised a small group to help fight against the British. In August, he and three other men departed for Egypt. They landed in Abu Qir, then travelled towards Ramleh, Alexandria. After a difficult crossing of Lake Mariout, they were surrounded and detained by British forces, without having undertaken any fighting. He secretly returned to Italy the following year.

In Florence he founded the weekly anarchist paper La Questione Sociale (The Social Question) in which his most popular pamphlet, Fra contadini (Among Farmers), first appeared. Malatesta went back to Naples in 1884—while waiting to serve a three-year prison term—to nurse the victims of a cholera epidemic. Once again, he fled Italy to escape imprisonment, this time heading for South America. He lived in Buenos Aires from 1885 until 1889, resuming publication of La Questione Sociale and spreading anarchist ideas among the Italian émigré community there. He was involved in the founding of the first militant workers' union in Argentina and left an anarchist impression in the workers' movements there for years to come.

Returning to Europe in 1889, Malatesta first published a newspaper called L'Associazione in Nice, remaining there until he was once again forced to flee to London.

=== Arrest in Italy ===
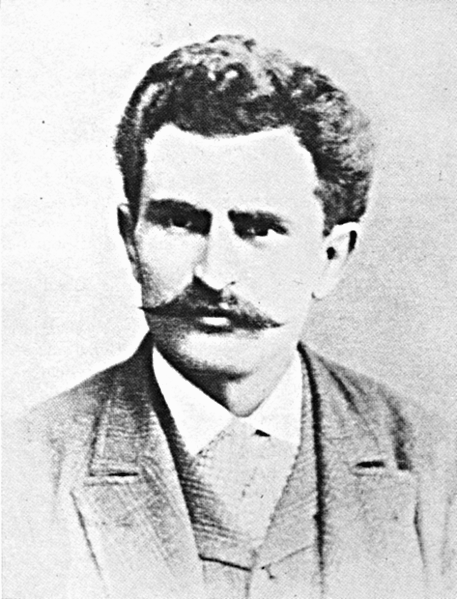
Malatesta around the 1890s

The late 1890s were a time of social turmoil in Italy, marked by bad harvests, rising prices, and peasant revolts. Strikes of workers were met by demands for repression and for a time it seemed as though government authority was hanging by a thread. Malatesta found the situation irresistible and early in 1898 he returned to the port city of Ancona to take part in the blossoming anarchist movement among the dockworkers there. Malatesta was soon identified as a leader during street fighting with police and arrested; he was therefore unable to participate further in the dramatic industrial and political actions of 1898 and 1899.

From jail, Malatesta took a hard line against participation in elections on behalf of liberal and socialist politicians, contradicting Saverio Merlino and other anarchist leaders who argued in favor of electoral participation as an emergency measure during times of social turmoil. Malatesta was convicted of "seditious association" and sentenced to a term of imprisonment on the island of Lampedusa.

=== Escape and later life ===
He was able to escape from prison in May 1899 and he made his way home to London via Malta and Gibraltar. His escape occurred with the help of comrades around the world, including anarchists in Paterson, New Jersey, London and Tunis, who helped arrange for him to leave the island on a ship of Greek sponge fishermen, who took him to Sousse.

In subsequent years, Malatesta visited the United States, speaking there to anarchists in the Italian and Spanish immigrant communities. Home again in London, he was closely watched by the police, who increasingly regarded anarchists as a threat following the July 1900 assassination of Umberto I by an Italian anarchist who had been living in Paterson, New Jersey.

In 1902, the founding congress of the Unión Obrera Democrática Filipina - first national trade union federation in the Philippines - adopted Malatesta's book Between Peasants as being part of the political foundation of the movement.

=== Return to London ===
By 1910, he had opened an electrical workshop in London at 15 Duncan Terrace Islington and allowed the jewel thief George Gardenstein to use his premises. On 15 January 1910, he sold oxyacetylene cutting equipment for £5 (£500 at 2013 monetary values) to George Gardenstein so that he could break into the safe at H. S. Harris jewellers Houndsditch. Gardenstein led the gang that mounted the abortive Houndsditch robbery that is the precursor to the Siege of Sidney Street. Malatesta's cutting gear is on permanent display at the City of London Police museum at Wood Street police station.

While based in London, Malatesta made clandestine trips to France, Switzerland and Italy and went on a lecture tour of Spain with Fernando Tarrida del Mármol. During this time, he wrote several important pamphlets, including L'Anarchia. Malatesta then took part in the International Anarchist Congress of Amsterdam (1907), where he debated in particular with Pierre Monatte on the relation between anarchism and syndicalism or trade unionism. The latter thought that syndicalism was revolutionary and would create the conditions of a social revolution, while Malatesta considered that syndicalism by itself was not sufficient.

After the First World War, Malatesta eventually returned to Italy for the final time. Two years after his return, in 1921, the Italian government imprisoned him again, although he was released two months before the fascists came to power. On 23 March 1921, Malatesta's supporters protested his imprisonment by bombing the Diana Theatre in Milan, killing twenty and wounding dozens more. From 1924 until 1926, when Benito Mussolini silenced all independent press, Malatesta published the journal Pensiero e Volontà, although he was harassed and the journal suffered from government censorship. He was to spend his remaining years leading a relatively quiet life, earning a living as an electrician. After years of suffering from a weak respiratory system and regular bronchial attacks, he developed bronchial pneumonia from which he died after a few weeks, despite being given 1,500 litres of oxygen in his last five hours. He died on Friday 22 July 1932. He was an atheist.

== Political beliefs ==
David Goodway writes that Malatesta held a "Mazzini-like role" and was "the leader of the Italian anarchist movement during its most important years. While other leaders of the International changed their opinions or abandoned politics, Malatesta remained firm in his original convictions for a half-century". In this sense, only Malatesta "remained devoted to anarchism by the end of the 1870s". Goodway argues that Malatesta was able to do so "by modifying his optimistic approach, substituting one of the more sophisticated versions of anarchism". Goodway writes that Malatesta developed "a two-pronged strategy" by the 1880s and early 1900s. Malatesta sought on one hand "to unify the anarchist and anti-parliamentary socialists into a new anarchist socialist party" as "anarchism was a minority movement within the Italian left", hence "Malatesta and his followers hoped to galvanize the elements of regional socialist group (the Fasci Siciliani, the Revolutionary Socialist Party of Romagna, and the Partito Operaio) into a new anti-parliamentary socialist party". On the other hand, Malatesta was "one of the first anarchists to stress a syndicalist strategy" and anarchists "had to prod the socialists into insurrections and remain a revolutionary conscience afterwards during socialist reconstruction". Goodway further writes that "Malatesta defined this type of anarchist communism as 'anarchism without adjectives'", described by Goodway as "a concept which he had developed with a group of Spanish anarchist intellectuals in the process mediating between mutually hostile collectivists and communists". In stressing "tolerance within the libertarian movement", Malatesta hoped that "Marxist socialists would permit the anarchists liberty for their own movement in post-revolutionary society".

According to Davide Turcato, the label "anarchist socialism" came to characterize Malatesta's brand of anarchism as he "proclaimed the socialist character of anarchism and urged anarchists to regain contact with the working masses, especially through involvement in the labor movement". For Malatesta, "demanding the anarchists' admission to the congress meant reasserting socialism and labor movement as central to anarchism; conversely, the Marxists' effort to exclude anarchists aimed at denying that they had a place among socialist and workers". According to Turcato, "Malatesta's struggle for admission to the congress was a statement of his new tactics". Turcato writes how "Malatesta recalled in the Labour Leader that in the old International both Marxists and Bakuninists wished to make their program triumph. In the struggle between centralism and federalism, class struggle and economic solidarity got neglected, and the International perished in the process. In contrast, anarchists were not presently demanding anyone to renounce their program. They only asked for divisions to be left out of the economic struggle, where they had no reason to exists ('Should')". In other words, "the issue was no longer hegemony, but the contrast between an exclusive view of socialism, for which one political idea was to be hegemonic, and an inclusive one, for which multiple political views were to coexist, united in the economic struggle. [...] The matter of the question had changed: the controversy was no longer with the anarchists, but about the anarchists".

Anarchists who influenced Malatesta's political beliefs included Pierre-Joseph Proudhon, Mikhail Bakunin, Carlo Cafiero, Peter Kropotkin and Élisée Reclus. In turn, Malatesta's works influenced Marxist philosopher Antonio Gramsci and anarcha-feminist activist Virginia Bolten, as well as the Argentine Regional Workers' Federation and wider Argentine anarchist movement.

=== On labour unions ===
Malatesta argued with Pierre Monatte at the Amsterdam Conference of 1907 against pure syndicalism. Malatesta thought that trade unions were reformist and could even be at times conservative. Along with Christiaan Cornelissen, he cited as example labor unions in the United States, where trade unions composed of skilled qualified workers sometimes opposed themselves to un-skilled workers in order to defend their relatively privileged position. Malatesta warned that the syndicalists aims were in perpetuating syndicalism itself whereas anarchists must always have overthrowing capitalism and the state, the anarchist ideal of communist society as their end and consequently refrain from committing to any particular method of achieving it.

Malatesta's arguments against the doctrine of revolutionary unions known as anarcho-syndicalism were later developed in a series of articles, where he wrote that "I am against syndicalism, both as a doctrine and a practice, because it strikes me as a hybrid creature." Despite their drawbacks, he advocated activity in the trade unions, both because they were necessary for the organization and self-defense of workers under a capitalist state regime, and as a way of reaching broader masses. Anarchists should have discussion groups in unions, as in factories, barracks and schools, but "anarchists should not want the unions to be anarchist."

Malatesta thought that "[s]yndicalism ... is by nature reformist" like all unions. While anarchists should be active in the rank and file, he said "any anarchist who has agreed to become a permanent and salaried official of a trade union is lost to anarchism." While some anarchists wanted to split from conservative unions to form revolutionary syndicalist unions, Malatesta predicted they would either remain an "affinity group" with no influence, or go through the same process of bureaucratization as the unions they left.

== Selected works ==
- Between Peasants: A Dialogue on Anarchy (1884)
- Anarchy (1891)
- At the Cafe: Conversations on Anarchism (1922)

== See also ==
- Anarchism in Italy
