= Camillo Berneri =

Italian anarchist activist (1897–1937)

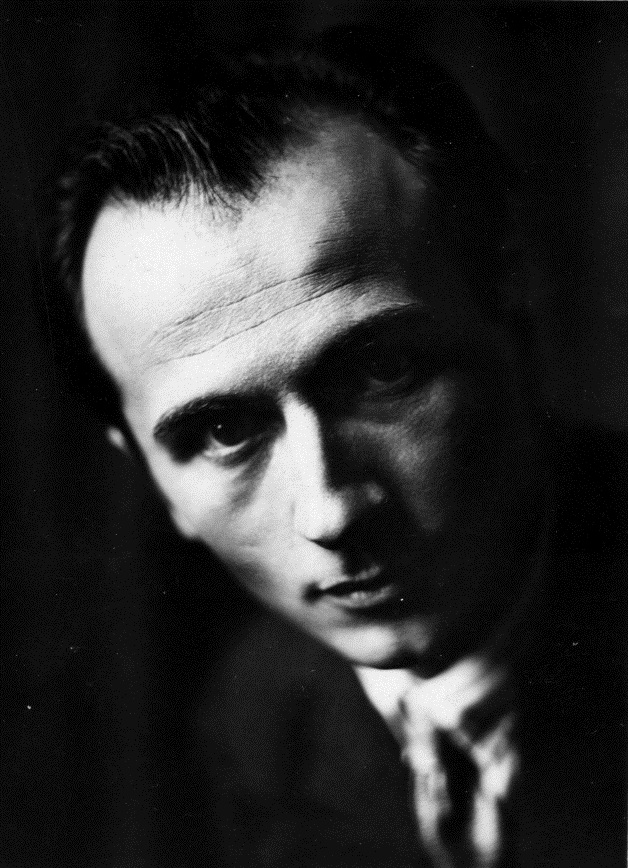
- Berneri, 1910
- Born: 28 May 1897; Lodi, Lombardy, Italy
- Died: 5 May 1937 (aged 39); Barcelona, Catalonia, Spain
- Cause of death: Summary execution
- Education: University of Florence
- Occupations: Teacher, bricklayer, journalist
- Political party: Italian Socialist Party (until 1915)
- Other political affiliations: Italian Syndicalist Union
- Movement: Anarchism, anti-fascism
- Spouse: Giovanna Caleffi (m. 1917–1937)
- Children: Maria Louisa, Giliana
- Military career
- Allegiance: Kingdom of Italy (1917); Spanish Republic (1936)
- Service: Royal Italian Army (1917); Confederal militias (1936)
- Service years: 1917; 1936
- Unit: Ascaso Column
- Conflicts: World War I Spanish Civil War: Battle of Monte Pelado; Battle of Talavera

Camillo Berneri (Italian: [berˈnɛːri]; 1897–1937) was an Italian anarchist and anti-fascist activist. Born in Lodi, Berneri joined the Italian Socialist Party at an early age, but quickly became dissilusioned with its lack of militancy and failure to oppose Italian imperialism. He then became an anarchist, joining the Italian Syndicalist Union (USI), and briefly worked as a schoolteacher before being forced to flee into exile after the rise of the Fascist dictatorship in Italy. Among exiled Italian anarchists, he became one of the movement's leading figures, which attracted the attention of fascist spies and the French police. From 1928 to 1931, he was arrested, imprisoned and expelled from multiple different countries in western Europe, none of which had a legal agreement about what to do with him.

After receiving a pardon, he rejoined the Italian anti-fascist movement, building an alliance between the anarchists and the liberal socialists of Giustizia e Libertà (GL). He also came into conflict with the Italian Communist Party (PCI), which he came to regard as an expression of "left-wing fascism". After the Italian invasion of Ethiopia, he held a conference of Italian anarchists in which they planned to lead an armed return to Italy in the event of its defeat in the war. He then went to fight in the Spanish Civil War, before finding a career as an anti-fascist journalist in Barcelona. There he exposed evidence of Italian plans to annex the Balearic Islands, called for the Spanish Republic to recognise Moroccan independence and denounced moves by the Republican government which he considered counterrevolutionary. During the May Days of 1937, Berneri was arrested in his home and executed near the Palace of the Generalitat of Catalonia. The main theories about his death hold that his killers were either Stalinists, Catalan nationalists, members of a Francoist fifth column, the OVRA, or Italian anarchists in the employ of Interior Minister Ángel Galarza, all of which had the motive and means to carry out the assassination.

== Biography ==
=== Early life and education ===
Camillo Berneri was born in the Lombard city of Lodi, on 28 May 1897. He was raised by his mother, Adalgisa Fochi, in Reggio. There he joined the youth wing of the Italian Socialist Party, within which he came under the influence of the socialist humanism espoused by Camillo Prampolini. He later joined the city's anarchist movement and was educated on anarchist philosophy by Torquato Gobbi. In 1915, Berneri resigned from the Socialist Party in an open letter, in which he accused the party of falling into a "destructive egoism" and called for a renewed sense of militancy. Considering anti-colonialism to be an integral aspect of his philosophy, he reproached the moderate socialists for not having adequately resisted the colonisation of Libya or the outbreak of World War I. Following the Italian entry into the war, in 1917, Berneri was himself conscripted into the Royal Italian Army.

He returned to his studies after the war, enrolling at the University of Florence, where he studied history under Gaetano Salvemini and met other members of the nascent Italian anti-fascist movement, including Carlo and Nello Rosselli. Following the Biennio Rosso, Berneri joined both the Italian Anarchist Union (UAI), an anarchist political organisation, and the Italian Syndicalist Union (USI), a trade union federation. He acted as a representative for the latter at the founding of the International Workers' Association (IWA) in 1922. He also closely followed anti-colonial movements fighting to overthrow the British Empire, from Ireland to India. He went on to teach the humanities at a secondary school, but by 1926, the establishment of a Fascist dictatorship in Italy compelled him to flee into exile. He was followed soon after by his wife Giovanna, and their two daughters Maria Louisa and Giliana.

=== Exile and expulsion ===
He initially went to France, where exiled Italian anarchists were facing the constant threat of fascist spies infiltrating their ranks. Berneri dedicated himself to counterintelligence operations to expose the fascist spies, which elevated him to a leading position within the Italian anarchist movement (succeeding Errico Malatesta and Luigi Fabbri). This made him into a key target for agent provocateurs, who circulated weapons among the anti-fascists to attract the attention of French police. He was arrested, detained and violently interrogated. During his questioning, he commented on an image of Voltaire on the pipe carried by one of the police officers, which briefly humanised him to the officer and opened up a dialogue between them.

What followed was a series of expulsions, arrests and counter-expulsions, which led Berneri to describe himself as "the most expelled anarchist in Europe". In December 1928, French authorities arrested Berneri and expelled him to Belgium, where he was swiftly arrested and imprisoned for possessing a fake passport and a gun. From his prison cell, he wrote to his daughter Giliana, attempting to reassure her of how much he love his family, despite the pain he was causing them through his exile. In May 1930, he was expelled to the Netherlands, but the Dutch authorities forced him back into Belgium, where he was arrested again. In June 1930, he was expelled into Luxembourg, where local police likewise arrested him and prepared his expulsion to France. He drew attention to the fact that he had already been expelled from France, and was prohibited from entering several other countries, so the police attempted to make his expulsion discrete. When he was pushed over the border, he began screaming to call the attention of nearby people to his expulsion, as he was arrested by French police.

In August 1930, the French authorities expelled him into Germany. During his brief stay in Berlin, he was shocked by the anti-Romani sentiment expressed by his neighbours towards the local Romani community, leading him to write about the use of xenophobia as a way to enforce societal conformity. In October 1930, he was expelled from Germany back into France, where he was subsequently arrested and imprisoned. The Human Rights League took up his case, organising a series of political demonstrations calling for his release. Berneri himself emphasised the illegality of his multiple expulsions and counter-expulsions, as the countries involved lacked any formal agreement or even permission from the countries they were expelling him into. In May 1931, he was finally granted a pardon by President Gaston Doumergue and released from prison.

=== Return to anti-fascist activism ===
Berneri then settled in Paris, where he worked as a bricklayer. For a time, he remained isolated and alone, despite the cosmopolitan environment of the French capital. The experience of constant arrests and expulsions had exhausted Berneri, and he fell into a depression. Despite the hardships, he continued to stimulate himself intellectually and develop his political philosophy, writing to Luigi Fabbri that he hoped to prepare an anarchist programme by 1933. He soon resumed his involvement with the exiled Italian anti-fascist movement, encouraging cooperation between anarchists and the more moderate liberal socialists of Giustizia e Libertà (GL). He also struggled against the political sectarianism of the Italian Communist Party (PCI), which at the time refused to cooperate with anti-fascist alliances and even attempted to recruit fascists into their ranks, leading Berneri to conclude that they were facing conflict with "left-wing fascism" (represented by Stalinism) as well as right-wing fascism. Berneri also reached out to Italian anarchists in the Americas, building a network of anti-fascist exiles from Raffaele Schiavina's L'Adunata dei refrattari in the United States to Luce Fabbri's Studi Sociali in Uruguay.

Berneri protested against the Italian invasion of Ethiopia in 1935, criticising the League of Nations for failing to stop it and even going so far as to hold Britain and France directly complicit in the invasion. In response to the invasion, the Rosselli brothers proposed a revolutionary alliance with the anarchists to overthrow the fascist dictatorship in the event of a military defeat in Ethiopia. That year, Berneri organised an Italian anarchist conference in Sartrouville, the first of its kind in over a decade, where they discussed how to organise a mass armed return to their home country in the event of a governmental crisis. The conference accepted alliances with anti-fascist mass organisations such as Giustizia e Libertà, acknowledging that they could not fight fascism by themselves, while opposing any formal affiliation with political parties. It concluded by signing a document, drafted by Berneri, which called for the destruction of the fascist regime and for anarchists to impede the establishment of any new government in its place.

=== Spanish Civil War ===
With the outbreak of the Spanish Civil War in 1936, Berneri and other Italian anti-fascists immediately travelled to revolutionary Catalonia to take part in the fighting. He arrived on 29 July, and on 7 August, he and Carlo Rosselli began organising their own militia column of Italian volunteers. The column was established on 17 August and then set off for the Aragon front; it was integrated into the Ascaso Column. Berneri himself fought at the Battle of Monte Pelado on 28 August, and the Battle of Talavera on 3 September. Soon after, he returned to Barcelona, as his fellow militiamen believed that his skills as a journalist would more useful to the anti-fascist cause. There he occupied himself with publishing the Italian magazine Guerra di Classe (English: Class War) and speaking in Italian anarchist radio broadcasts.

He began going through the documents of the Italian consulate, which had been vacated by the fascists and occupied by anti-fascists at the beginning of the war. There he found evidence that Mussolini was planning to further expand the Italian Empire by occupying and annexing the Balearic Islands, which would be used as a strategic counterweight against British and French influence in the Mediterannean. Comparing Mussolini's intervention in Spain to his earlier conquest of Ethiopia, Berneri characterised the Italian intervention in support of the Spanish nationalists as an opportunistic cover for territorial expansion. He even discovered the Italian government's intentions to annex the islands went as far back as the 1920s, when they began advertising the Balearics as a holiday destination for Italian tourists and prime location for business investments. Berneri came to believe that Italian imperialism in the Mediterannean would continue on from Spain, until Italy had annexed Algeria, Egypt, Morocco and Tunisia. Berneri's subsequent article, "Mussolini and the Conquest of the Balearic Islands", became one of his most important writings of the war. Italian historian Pier Carlo Masini later found evidence in the archives of the Casellario Politico Centrale that Berneri was brought under close surveillance by the Italian fascist secret police, the OVRA.

From October 1936, Berneri's articles in Guerra di Classe became increasingly more combative, as he came to view his publication as a weapon. He strongly criticised the Non-Intervention Committee, which he viewed as having allowed Fascist and Nazi intervention to continue while also blocking weapons shipments to the Spanish Republic. Under the circumstances, he believed it necessary to the war effort for Spanish anarchists to ally themselves with Moroccan independence activists and compel the Republican government to withdraw its claims in Morocco. Despite the efforts by Berneri and the anarchist diplomat Gonzalo de Reparaz, the Republican government refused to accept Moroccan independence and even began deploying racist propaganda against the Moroccans commanded by Francisco Franco.Berneri's son-in-law, the British anarchist Vernon Richards, later argued that one of the biggest mistakes of the Republican faction had been its failure to support Moroccan independence.

Over time, Berneri became increasingly critical of the leadership of the National Confederation of Labour (CNT), particularly after it made the decision to join the Republican government in November 1936. The decision deeply concerned Berneri, as he believed it could compromise the social revolution by allying with the various Republican parties which were opposed to it. He also criticised the establishment of the Economic Council of Catalonia, considering it to be an "[in]sufficient compensation" for the anarchists joining the government and comparing it to the National Economic Council in France. Berneri believed that the social revolution and the war against fascism were inseparable, and that to win one, it was necessary to win the other as well. In terms of military strategy, he argued for the Republic to shift from static trench warfare to tightly planned maneuver warfare. He also called for the mobilisation of Spanish workers and warned against any proposals by the government for the militarisation of the anarchist militias.

Over the subsequent months, Berneri became louder in his denunciations of the rising influence of the Communist Party of Spain (PCE), which had attracted many members of the middle class by promising to defend private property from collectivisation. He denounced the Soviet Union's involvement in the Republic, as he considered their offer of military aid in exchange for political influence to amount to a form of blackmail. He accused the Soviets of attempting to sabotage the social revolution and control the anti-fascist movement in Spain. His vocal anti-Stalinism drew the attention of Soviet consul Vladimir Antonov-Ovseenko, who attempted to use his position to suppress him. Berneri also criticised the liberal democracies of Western Europe for turning a blind eye to the rise of fascism, out of fear of the consequences of a successful revolution in Spain. He predicted that if the liberal democracies did not confront fascism in Spain, then it would inevitably lead to a second world war.

Berneri's critical articles came to a head in April 1937, when he published an open letter to Federica Montseny, the anarchist Minister of Health. He complained that in the government's attempts to appease French and British interests by disarming revolutionaries and blocking Moroccan independence, the war had deteriorated into a war of survival. He blamed the Stalinists, who had openly announced their intention to purge anarcho-syndicalist and Trotskyist elements of the Republican faction, while the anarchist press remained silent. In the subsequent weeks, Berneri was one of the few anarchists who wrote in defense of the Workers' Party of Marxist Unification (POUM). He praised the anarchists who were attempting to moderate between the POUM and the PCE, as he believed that the dispute was in violation of military discipline, and noted that the POUM had helped the anarchists resist the military coup in spite of their ideological differences. POUM member Víctor Alba later praised Berneri for supporting the party, at a time when he believed anarchist support for the POUM was insufficient. In another appeal to Montseny, Berneri declared that their choice was between "victory over Franco through revolutionary war or defeat".

=== Death ===
On 3 May 1937, Berneri gave what would be his last radio speech, paying homage to the communist philosopher Antonio Gramsci following his death in a fascist prison. That same day, violent street clashes between anarchists and the Catalan government broke out in Barcelona, in what came to be known as the May Days. Berneri publicly denounced the Unified Socialist Party of Catalonia (PSUC) and its leader Joan Comorera, as well as PCE leader Santiago Carrillo, Interior Minister Ángel Galarza, and the right-wing Catalan nationalists of Catalan Republic Action, whom he held responsible for what he termed a "counter-revolution". According to Augustin Souchy, on the morning of 4 May, Berneri's home was surrounded by Mossos d'Esquadra (Catalan police force) and members of the PSUC, the latter wearing red armbands. The police warned Berneri and his friend, a fellow Italian anarchist named Francesco Barbieri, that there was shooting taking place in the neighbourhood. Two men wearing red armbands then searched his home and carried away some of his documents. According to Souchy, Berneri's investigation into Fascist Italy's expansionist plans in the Mediterranean were among the documents removed. Later that afternoon, the police returned to confiscate weapons belonging to Italian militiamen and took note of the building. By that time, the building had fallen behind government lines, which kept Berneri confined there.

On 5 May 1937, at about 17:00, Berneri and Barbieri were arrested in their home. According to Souchy, 12 agents had entered the building, half of whom were Mossos and the other half were PSUC members. When they asked the group leader for his name, he showed them his identity card, which had the number 1109; Berneri and Barbieri were then charged with counterrevolutionary activities. The whole exchange was witnessed by Barbieri's wife. They were taken away from their home and then summarily executed later that night; both of them were unarmed. Their bodies were discovered near the Palace of the Generalitat of Catalonia, by members of the Spanish Red Cross. Their bodies were then taken to the Hospital Clinic, where an autopsy found that they had been killed by machine gun fire. Their bodies were identified by their wives, who were accompanied by the Italian-American journalist Enrico Arrigoni. The street fighting in Barcelona continued on for two more days, before a shortage of food on the anarchist side forced them to abandon the barricades.

The assassination of Berneri was not officially announced until 8 May, after the fighting in Barcelona had stopped. Solidaridad Obrera did not report the details until 11 May, and censored some of the details to avoid identifying the men who searched Berneri's house as members of the PSUC. It also linked his murder to the recent disappearance of French communist Marc Rhein. After hearing of Berneri's assassination, Luce Fabbri immediately reached out to Giovanna Berneri and her daughters, offering her support; she was one of the first people to publicly denounce his assassination. Some Spanish anarchists carried out a criminal investigation of the killing, and identified an unnamed agent linked to the PSUC, but the investigation was forced to stop due to political repression. As no incontrovertible evidence has been found to establish who killed Berneri, multiple different hypotheses have been raised as to the identity and motive of the killers.

Anarcho-syndicalists who were sympathetic to Berneri, including Augustin Souchy, Vernon Richards and Rudolf Rocker, attributed his murder to the Stalinists, citing his repeated and vocal criticisms he had made against them. On 29 May, Il Grido del Popolo, the newspaper of the Italian Communist Party, printed an article celebrating Berneri's execution and claiming political responsibility for it, justifying it as an act of self-defense against a supporter of the anarchist uprising. In June 1937, the National Committee of the CNT blamed the uprising and the execution of Berneri on the Estat Català, a far-right Catalan nationalist party, who they claim to have killed him due to his extensive knowledge of Fascist Italy's operations in the Mediterranean. According to this narrative, it was members of the Estat Català, not the PSUC, who had disguised themselves as police and murdered Bresci on orders from the OVRA. Catalan anarchist Joan Garcia Oliver later remarked that, although anarchists were predisposed at the time to blame the Stalinists for the murder, he believed it was also possible that the OVRA had been involved. Garcia Oliver noted the similarities between Berneri's murder and that of the Roselli brothers, who were killed shortly after him by members of La Cagoule, acting under OVRA orders.

Historians largely hold either the Stalinists or Catalan nationalists to have been responsible for Berneri's execution, although alternate theories have also emerged. Uruguayan historian Carlos Rama believed Berneri was assassinated by a Francoist fifth column, under the direction of the OVRA, citing Berneri's anti-fascist publications, his surveillance by the OVRA, and his alleged involvement in a plot to assassinate Benito Mussolini. Following a conversation with Rama on the matter, Federica Montseny began to question her previous belief that Stalinists had killed Berneri, as both the fascists and communists had the motive and the means to kill him. In a letter to Burnett Bolloten, she stated that Berneri's death was likely to forever remain unsolved. Italian historians Roberto Gremmo and Saverio Pechar believe Berneri was killed by agents of the interior minister Ángel Galarza, after Italian anarchists had stolen a suitcase full of gold from him. According to this narrative, Galarza had ordered Berneri's assassination in order to prevent him from going public with evidence of the embezzlement of public funds. Intelligence linking Galarza to the killing was presented to ministers of the Spanish Socialist Workers' Party (PSOE), reporting that he had employed Italian anarchists to find and seize any incriminating documents possessed by Berneri. British historian Helen Graham suggests that these Italian anarchists may also have been agents of the OVRA.

== Political thought ==
=== Anarchism ===
Berneri was a strong supporter anarcho-syndicalism and a member of the Italian Syndicalist Union (USI). He believed that the best route to build the anarchist movement was through trade unions, although he distrusted and rejected union representatives. He also disliked individualist anarchism, which he believed held an outsized influence on the anarchist movement, relative to its small size. He nevertheless believed that a diversity of tactics was important, as it would allow anarchist groups to pursue their own goals while not interfering with the activities of others.

Like other members of the USI, Berneri praised the original conception of the Soviet as a workers' council, which he described as a model of self-governance capable of preparing people for autonomy. He claimed it to be wholly in accordance with anarchist ideals, distinguishing the workers' council from the bureaucratic and authoritarian socialism of the Bolsheviks. For this position, Berneri was criticised as "philo-Soviet" by the individualist anarchist Raffaele Schiavina.

Berneri developed an internationalist anarchist approach to geopolitics, which placed the globalisation of revolution in opposition to the rise of globalised totalitarianism. He called for anarchists to rid themselves of any a prioiri ideological convictions and to stop putting off discussions of tactics and goals until a later date. He worried that halting the progress of the revolutionary movement could present a danger to it, due to the inherent status quo bias of the majority of people. He also rejected any affiliation with political parties, which he believed maintained themselves at the expense of revolutionary action.

Berneri was harshly critical of abstention from electoral participation, which he believed had become a dogma which anarchists held to regardless of the circumstances. Berneri accepted democratic participation in certain contexts, particularly when it came to forms of direct democracy such as referendums. He based his opposition to abstentionism on previous works by Mikhail Bakunin and Errico Malatesta, and his views were supported by Luigi Bertoni and Gigi Damiani. Drawing from Peter Kropotkin's critiques of centralisation and the works of Carlo Cattaneo, Berneri advocated for federalism and municipalism as an alternative to statism. Citing Kropotkin and Malatesta, as well as Louise Michel and Pietro Gori, Berneri advocated for an anarchist form of humanism, although he maintained a position in favour of class conflict. Berneri rejected the idea of "the people" as a homogenous entity with a general will.

=== Anti-fascism ===
Berneri was part of a generation of Italian anarchists for whom anti-fascism defined their activism and political philosophy. From the moment street violence between fascists and anti-fascists began to accelerate in 1921, anti-fascism became a central part of Berneri's writings. Berneri developed a cultural and psychological analysis of fascism, to complement existing economistic understandings of it as a new phase of capitalism. He believed that the fascists, despite their perceived low intellectual capacities, had been able to defeat the Italian labour movement due to Benito Mussolini's performative and dramatic personality (comparing him to an actor).

Berneri fiercely criticised racism and antisemitism, which he depicted as a shared psychosis based in pseudoscience, and dismissed racial categorisations as a fiction designed to justify colonialism and totalitarianism. Sociologist Federico Ferretti argued that Berneri's anti-racist ideas presaged contemporary critical race theory.

Berneri also wrote about Jewish assimilation as a form of internalised antisemitism, for which he received praise from the French Zionist André Spire. He criticised Freemasonry for its "ambiguous form of anti-fascism", which he believed to act in the interests of the "bourgeoisie", and cautioned against anarchist participation in the Masonic movement.

== Legacy ==
=== Preservation of writings ===
Berneri's work is well known in Italian scholarship, having contributed to a number of contemporary philosophical and sociological debates, but most of his writings have not been translated into the English language. Many of Berneri's writings were preserved in his family archive in Emilia. Due to his short life, much of which was spent in exile, Berneri was never able to collect and systematise his ideas, which remained scattered throughout various different publications, notes and letters. When archivists and editors began to collect his works together into single volumes, they excised parts that conflicted with their own views and placed him in the position of an infallible martyr of the Italian anarchist movement. In 1973, the Iberian Liberation Movement clandestinely published new Spanish translations of Berneri's works. Frank Mintz subsequently translated them into French and, in 1978, they were translated into English by Cienfuegos Press.

=== Debate over unorthodox views ===
Italian liberal scholars have argued that Berneri's work represented a "heretical" deviation from anarchist orthodoxy. This characterisation of Berneri's views as "heretical" came from his conflict with the Galleanists of the anti-organisational tendency, his criticism of electoral abstention, his advocacy of federalism and his humanist philosophy. Although at the time they were a minority tendency in the Italian anarchist movement, later interpretations by liberal scholars Pietro Adamo and Carlo De Maria argued that the anti-organisationalists were themselves the "orthodox anarchists" and thus that Berneri was actually closer to liberalism than anarchism.

Gianni Carrozza and Federico Ferretti have rejected this characterisation, which they consider to be misleading and lacking in historical context. Ferretti argues that, although anarchism has always been too plural to have a single orthodoxy, the mainstream tendency during Berneri's time was that of pro-organisational anarchist communism. Ferretti pointed to the existence of possiblist tendencies in the anarchist movement, as well as the participation of the CNT in the 1936 Spanish general election, as examples of electoral participation by anarchists. He also highlighted the long history of Italian anarchists being influenced by federalists of the Risorgimento period, with Malatesta and Fabbri having been influenced by Giuseppe Garibaldi, Giuseppe Mazzini and Carlo Pisacane, among others. Ferretti concluded that, if any orthodoxy existed among the Italian anarchist movement of the time, then Berneri was a part of it.

== Selected works ==
- "Lenin is a-coming" (Il grido della rivolta, June 1920)
- "Regarding our critiques of Bolshevism" (Umanità Nova, June 1922)
- "Against the Racist Delirium" (Buenos Aires, February 1935)
- "Abstentionism and anarchism" (L'Adunata dei Refrattari, April 1936)
- "What Spanish anarchism must do to win" (Guerra di Classe, October 1936)
- "Beware, Dangerous Corner!" (Guerra di Classe, November 1936)
- "Between the war and the Revolution" (Guerra di Classe, December 1936)
- "Social democracy and communism betrays the revolution" (Guerra di Classe, February 1937)
- "War and Revolution" (Guerra di Classe, March 1937)
- "The anarchists in government in Spain" (Guerra di Classe, April 1937)
- "Counter-Revolution on the March" (Guerra di Classe, May 1937)
- "In Defence of the POUM" (Guerra di Classe, May 1937)
- "Non-intervention and international involvement in the Spanish Civil War" (Guerra di Classe, July 1937)

== Bibliography ==
- Alexander, Robert J. (1999). The Anarchists in the Spanish Civil War. London: Janus Publishing Company. ISBN 978-1-85756-400-6.
- Bolloten, Burnet (1991). The Spanish Civil War: Revolution and Counterrevolution. University of North Carolina Press. ISBN 0-8078-1906-9. LCCN 89-77911.
- Ferretti, Federico (2020). "Transnational Anarchism Against Fascisms: Subaltern geopolitics and spaces of exile in Camillo Berneri's work". In Braskén, Kasper; Copsey, Nigel; Featherstone, David J. (eds.). Anti-Fascism in a Global Perspective. Routledge. pp. 176–196. doi:10.4324/9780429058356-9. ISBN 9780429058356.
- Graham, Helen (2002). "The Barcelona May days and their consequences (February–August 1937)". The Spanish Republic at War, 1936–1939. Cambridge: Cambridge University Press. pp. 254–315. ISBN 0-521-45932-X. OCLC 464890766.
- Mintz, Frank (1978). "Camillo Berneri: a biography of an anarchist from Italy". Cienfuegos Press Anarchist Review (4): 47–48. ISSN 0309-7285.
- Shantz, Jeff (7 July 2024). "Camillo Berneri, Decolonization, and the Spanish Revolution". Libcom.org.
