= Eresia =

Eresia may refer to:

- Eresia, a journal edited by Enrico Arrigoni
- Eresia (butterfly), a genus of butterflies
