= Battle of Monte Pelado =

Battle of the Spanish Civil War

- Part of the Spanish Civil War
- Frontlines of the civil war, as of July 1936
| Date | 28 August 1936 |
| Location | Torre Lierta, Uesca, Aragon, Spain 42°05′42.78″N 0°30′14.78″W |
| Result | Italian anti-fascist victory |

Belligerents
| Italian anti-fascists | (Francoist Spain) Spanish Nationalists |

Commanders and leaders
| Mario Angeloni †; Giuseppe Bifolchi | Carlos Sanez |

Units involved
| Italian Column | Spanish Army |

Strength
| 100–130 volunteers | 600–650 soldiers; 6 armoured cars; 3 artillery cannons |

Casualties and losses
| ≥6 dead | >600 dead; Few taken prisoner |

The Battle of Monte Pelado (Spanish: Batalla de Monte Pelado; Italian: Battaglia del Monte Pelato) was an early engagement of the Spanish Civil War, which took place on 28 August 1936 in the province of Huesca. During the battle, roughly 100 Italian anti-fascist volunteers defended Torre Lierta (nicknamed Monte Pelato by the volunteers) from a trained and well-equipped Nationalist force several times its size. The Italians held out for four hours against a frontal assault and flanking maneuvers, before counterattacking. The anti-fascist victory in the battle opened the way for a further series of Republican offensives in Huesca.

== Background ==
Soon after the outbreak of the Spanish Civil War, many Italian anti-fascists went to revolutionary Catalonia to enlist in the anarchist militias. On 17 August, an Italian militia column was established by Camillo Berneri of the Italian Syndicalist Union, Carlo Rosselli of Giustizia e Libertà and Mario Angeloni of the Italian Republican Party, with funding from the Italian-American syndicalist Carlo Tresca. It was integrated into the Ascaso Column and went to fight on the Aragon front.

The Column arrived in the village of Bizién, in the province of Huesca, on 21 August. There they met with Domingo Ascaso, who suggested they take the peak of Torre Lierta, a strategically important hill in the Galocha Plateau, which overlooked the frontlines; situated between the cities of Almudébar and Uesca. Angeloni nicknamed it the Monte Pelato (English: Bald Mountain). On 25 August, riflemen led by Giuseppe Bifolchi and a machine-gun detachment led by Angeloni established a military camp on the mountain and immediately dug trenches around it, creating a highly defensible position.

== Battle ==
At 04:00, on 28 August, Nationalist forces attacked Monte Pelado in a frontal assault. The Nationalists outnumbered the Italians: between 600 and 650 highly-trained and well-equipped soldiers, with the backing of artillery cannons and a number of armoured vehicles, faced between 100 and 130 Italian volunteers. It was the Italian Column's first battle of the Spanish Civil War, and the first that Italian anti-fascists had fought in since the dissolution of the Arditi del Popolo.

During the first wave of the Nationalist attack, the first defender to die was an old Italian anarchist named Michele Centrone, who was killed by a bullet to the head. The Italians repelled the frontal assault, but the Nationalists then attempted to flank them. On the right flank, the anarchist journalist Fosco Falaschi was killed; while on the left flank, a Sardinian anti-fascist named Giuseppe Zuddas was killed and Mario Angeloni was mortally wounded while crossing open ground to throw grenades at an armoured vehicle. After four hours of fighting, at 08:00, the Italian Column counterattacked. While pursuing the retreating Nationalists, Attilio Papperotto and Andrea Colliva were both shot in the head after they had exposed themselves.

By the end of the battle, the Italian Column had killed most of the Nationalist attackers and taken only a few as prisoners of war. The bodies of the fallen anti-fascists were buried in Bizién. Mario Angeloni died at a field hospital in Balbastro and his funeral was held in Barcelona. Bifolchi subsequently took command of the column. Also among those who survived the battle were Carlo Rosselli and Camillo Berneri, as well as the artist Giandante X and the anarchist Alberto Meschi.

== Aftermath ==
The Italian Column's victory at Monte Pelado opened the way for a series of offensives in the province of Uesca, with the aim of surrounding the city of Huesca and cutting off the road between it and Zaragoza. It also received attention in the international press and inspired many more anti-fascists to come to Spain to fight. Meanwhile, members of the Italian Communist Party attempted to downplay the battle's significance and dismissed it as inconsequential. In November 1936, the Italian Column was reorganised into two battalions: the Matteotti Battalion, led by Rosselli; and the International Battalion, led by the anarchists. These battalions remained in the Ascaso Column.

== Bibliography ==
- Alexander, Robert J. (1999). The Anarchists in the Spanish Civil War. London: Janus Publishing Company. ISBN 978-1-85756-400-6. OCLC 43717219.
- Galimberti, Jacopo (2022). "Giandante X: An Artist for Gramsci and the International Brigades (1920–1941)". Artl@s Bulletin. 11 (1): 29–48. ISSN 2264-2668.
- Marzocchi, Umberto (2005). Remembering Spain: Italian anarchist volunteers in the Spanish Civil War. Translated by Sharkey, Paul (2nd ed.). Kate Sharpley Library. ISBN 9781873605981.
- Masulli, Marco (2022). "Italian Anarcho-syndicalism: Connections and Links between Spain and Argentina". In Dogliani, Patrizia; Fuentes Codera, Maximiliano (eds.). Continental Transfers: Cultural and Political Exchange among Spain, Italy and Argentina, 1914-1945. Berghahn Books. pp. 68–89. ISBN 9781800733404.
- Mintz, Frank (1978). "Camillo Berneri: a biography of an anarchist from Italy". Cienfuegos Press Anarchist Review (4): 47–48. ISSN 0309-7285.
- Mugnai, Bruno (2019). Foreign volunteers and International Brigades in the Spanish civil war (1936-39). Soldiershop. ISBN 9788893274524.
- Pernicone, Nunzio (2010). "Fascism on the March". Carlo Tresca. AK Press. pp. 217–226. ISBN 9781849350037.
- Pugliese, Stanislao G. (2007). "Revisiting an Assassination: The Death of Carlo Rosselli". In Gundle, S.; Rinaldi, L. (eds.). Assassinations and Murder in Modern Italy. Italian and Italian American Studies. Palgrave Macmillan. pp. 11–22. doi:10.1057/9780230606913_2. ISBN 978-1-4039-8391-6.
- Tremlett, Giles (2020). The International Brigades: Fascism, Freedom and the Spanish Civil War. Bloomsbury Publishing. pp. 55–63. ISBN 978-1-4088-5398-6.
- Zimmer, Kenyon (2016). "The Other Volunteers: American Anarchists and the Spanish Civil War, 1936–1939". Journal for the Study of Radicalism. 10 (2): 19–52. doi:10.14321/jstudradi.10.2.0019.
