= May Days =

Street battles in Barcelona during the Spanish Civil War (1937)

Barcelona May Days
- Part of the Spanish Revolution of 1936 during the Spanish Civil War
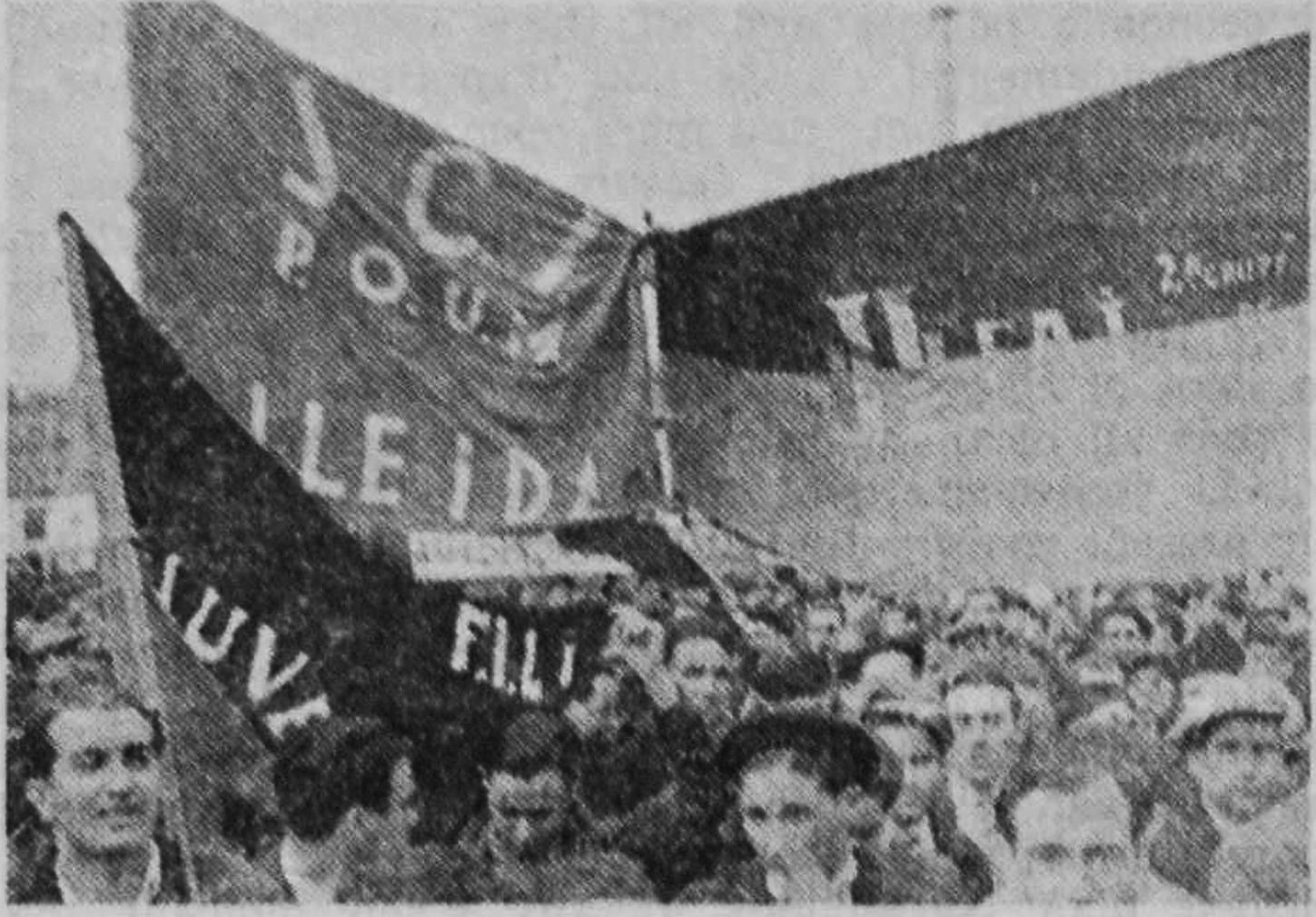
- A demonstration held by POUM and FAI in honor of formation of the "Revolutionary Front" between the two organizations, 1937
Date	3–8 May 1937
Location	Barcelona and wider Catalonia
Result	Government victory: Recovery of government control in Barcelona and Catalonia

Belligerents
Spanish Republic; Guardia de Asalto; Generalitat of Catalonia; Communist Party of Spain; Unified Socialist Party of Catalonia; Supported by: Soviet Union	CNT-FAI; FIJL; Friends of Durruti Group; POUM

Strength
Variable (Note: Three groups of the Guardia de Asalto (3,000 troops) were available for the security forces, to which must be added 1,000 troops of the Guardia Nacional Republicana (GNR) and other security forces like the Mossos d'Esquadra. Later, 4,000 Guardias de Asalto were sent as reinforcements. Meanwhile, the Navy sent the battleship Jaime I and two destroyers. The auxiliary forces of the PSUC, ERC and Estat Català should be noted.)	

Casualties and losses
- 500–1,000 dead 1,500 wounded

The May Days, sometimes also called May Events, were a series of clashes between 3 and 8 May 1937 during which factions on the Republican side of the Spanish Civil War engaged one another in street battles in various parts of Catalonia, centered on the city of Barcelona.

In those events, libertarian socialist supporters of the Spanish Revolution, such as the anarchist CNT and the anti-Stalinist POUM, which opposed a centralized government, faced others, such as the Republican government, Catalan government and the Communist Party of Spain, which believed in a strong central government.

The events were the culmination of the confrontation between prewar Republican legality and the Spanish Revolution, which had been in constant strife since the beginning of the Spanish Civil War.

== Background ==
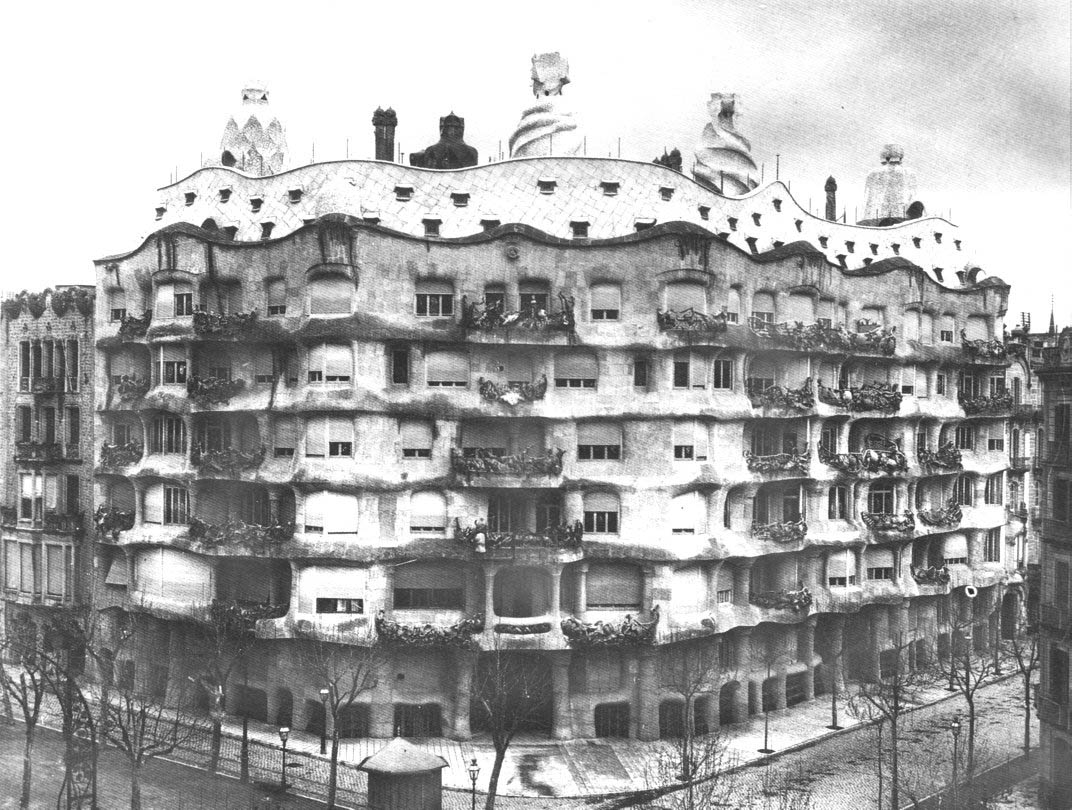
Casa Milà was seized by the United Socialist Party of Catalonia (PSUC) in 1936. During much of the civil war it housed the Catalan Ministry of the Economy and Agriculture

The Francoist military rebellion of July 1936 failed in Barcelona, and since then the city, as well as the rest of Catalonia, had been under the control of workers' militias, especially ones associated with the anarchist trade union Confederación Nacional del Trabajo (CNT-FAI) and the socialist trade union Unión General de Trabajadores (UGT). Just after taking the last rebelling barracks, the anarchist leaders met with the President of the Generalitat de Catalunya Lluís Companys. It resulted in the Central Committee of Antifascist Militias of Catalonia being established, the de facto government of Barcelona and Catalonia. It represented most parties from the Front d'Esquerres (the name of the Popular Front in Catalonia). The Generalitat and the central government had lost all freedom of action and assisted passively in the revolution that was taking place in Catalonia and extended to Aragon. The industries were collectivized, but there was always the same problem when the petitions of loans to the banks (collectivized but under control of communists and the government) were denied because those industries were not being supervised by the Generalitat. In October, the committee dissolved itself, and its members became councilors of the government of the Generalitat of Catalonia. However, the Patrullas de Control ("Control Patrols", a revolutionary body that had a repressive character and in which CNT-FAI had a relative majority) continued their activities freely because of the inability of the Catalan government to control them.

The climate of distrust and confrontation was present not only among republican institutions and workers' organizations but also between those organizations, especially of anarchists toward socialists, communists and Catalan nationalists. Even among the communists, there was much division. The Communist Party of Spain (PCE) and the Unified Socialist Party of Catalonia (PSUC) followed the official doctrine of the Soviet Union and supported the separate handling of war and revolution and defending the Second Spanish Republic. The PCE was the major communist party in the country, but the PSUC was the main communist organization in Catalonia. At the other extreme, the anti-authoritarian Workers' Party of Marxist Unification (POUM) of former Right and Left Opposition radically opposed Joseph Stalin and supported carrying out the revolution while the war was raging; the anarchists agreed on that point with the POUM.

Tension was rising because a chain of events that took place during the winter that heated the political climate and paved the way for what would take place later. The PCE's campaign against the POUM had begun in March during a political conference in Valencia. The POUM leaders were vilified and accused of being covert Nazi agents under a false revolutionary propaganda of being enemy agents infiltrated in the country. The POUM had come to propose an invitation for Leon Trotsky to reside in Catalonia, despite its differences with him. The POUM leaders were becoming increasingly wary during the spring of 1937. Tension in the streets of Barcelona was becoming evident of the arrival of a hot spring: the Patrullas de Control were led by José Asens and continued arbitrarily arresting and murdering in their infamous paseos. (Note: Paseo (literally 'take a walk') was a euphemism used during the Spanish Civil War to refer to executions by a firing squad. The victim would be "released" and later shot in the back while he walked away from his captors.) Other anarchist patrols practiced expropriations. Josep Tarradellas, as Companys' right hand, was determined to unify the security forces in Catalonia under one command and to finish with the Patrullas de Control. On 26 March, Tarradellas banned members of the police from having political affiliation and demanded all political organizations to hand over their weapons. Thus, anarchists withdrew from the government of the Generalitat of Catalonia. The open crisis forced Companys to give in to their demands, anarchists retained their weapons, and the Control Patrols remained in place.

On 25 April, a force of Carabineros forced patrols of CNT in Puigcerdà to hand over control of the customs house. Juan Negrín, the Finance Minister, had resolved to end the anomaly under which the CNT controlled that important border. Puigcerdá had become a center of espionage, falsification of passports and clandestine leakage. Its mayor, Antonio Martin, insisted on general collectivization but raised his own livestock. After a violent confrontation occurred, he and several of his men were killed. Negrín then found it easier to gain control over the other customs posts.

The Guardia Nacional Republicana and the Guardia de Asalto ("Assault Guards") were sent to Figueres and other cities in northern Catalonia to replace CNT patrols. In Barcelona, fear began of an outbreak of open warfare between the anarchists and the POUM against the government and the communists. Each side formed weapon caches and secretly fortified its buildings for fear that its rivals would attack it first.

The tense calm continued for one week. May Day, traditionally a day of celebration, was spent in silence, as the UGT and the CNT agreed to suspend their parades, which inevitably would have caused riots.

== Opposing sides ==
Three main political forces were involved in the events that led to the May Days. Although all parties had winning the war as their main objective, the CNT, the Libertarian Youth, and the POUM and other minor groups like the anarchist Friends of Durruti Group or the Trotskyist Bolshevik-Leninist Section of Spain had a clear revolutionary motivation. The participation of these groups in the war, which was decisive in the opening events of the war, was motivated by the defense of the revolution and not the Republic. The Unified Socialist Party of Catalonia (PSUC) considered a revolutionary approach inappropriate without winning the war first.

There were also groups with other political affiliations that were inclined to return to the Republican legality, the authorities of the Republican Government in Valencia and the Generalitat. They forged an alliance with the aforementioned PSUC and the Republican Left of Catalonia. A third sector was composed by the "possibilist" sector of the CNT, supporting an immediate termination of hostilities between both sides. Although the PSUC was not a bourgeois party, from the point of view of the Republican authorities it presented itself as an alternative to the revolutionary chaos, and it advocated for the strengthening of central government that would replace the local committees. To get this done, they proposed a centrally organized and instructed army, led by a single command. George Orwell summarized the PSUC-party line as follows:

Clinging on to the fragments of workers' control and parroting revolutionary aims is worse than useless: not only an obstacle but also counter-revolutionary, because it leads to divisions that fascists can use against us. At this stage we do not fight for the proletarian dictatorship [...].

— George Orwell

On the position of the POUM, shared by most of the more radical anarchists, like the Friends of Durruti, Orwell states:

The workers' militias and police-forces must be preserved in their present form and every effort to "bourgeoisify" them must be resisted. If the workers do not control the armed forces, the armed forces will control the workers. The war and the revolution are inseparable.

— George Orwell

== Chronology ==
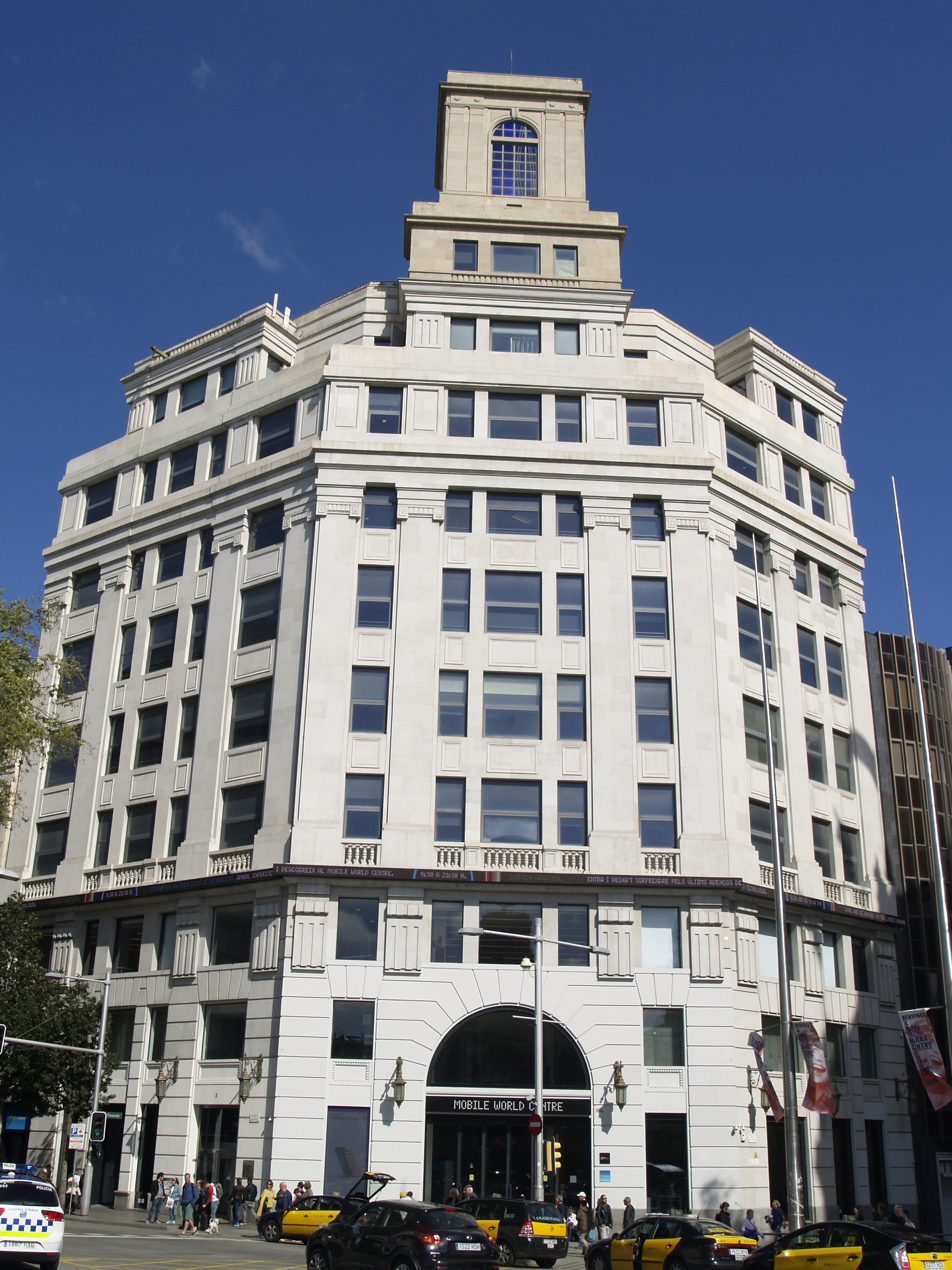
Telefónica building in Barcelona, which heralded the beginning of the May Events

=== Preliminary events ===
On 2 May, the Minister of the Navy and Air Force, Indalecio Prieto, telephoned the Generalitat from Valencia. An anarcho-syndicalist telephonist on the other side replied that in Barcelona there was no government, only a Defense Committee. The government was convinced that anarchists were recording their telephone conversations since they, of course, had the means to do so. The same day, there was a call from President Manuel Azaña to Companys, President of the Generalitat. During the conversation, it was cut by the operator, who said that the lines should be used for more important purposes than a mere talk between presidents.

=== 3 May ===
A force of 200 police officers, commanded by the Minister of Public Order of the Government of Catalonia, Eusebio Rodríguez Salas, went to the Telefónica central exchange and presented itself at the censorship department located on the second floor, with the intention of taking control of the building. The anarchists saw that as a provocation since Telefónica was legally occupied by an anarcho-syndicalist committee, according to a decree on collectivization from the Generalitat itself. Rodríguez Salas, on his part, had authorization from the head of internal affairs of the regional government, Artemi Aiguader i Miró. The anarchist workers opened fire from the second-floor landing of the censorship department. Salas phoned in for help, with a company of the National Republican Guard arriving along with two Control Patrols heads, Dionisio Eroles (of the anarchist police station) and José Asens (of the Control Patrols). Eroles persuaded the CNT workers to cease fire; although they resisted at first, they surrendered their weapons, not before shooting through the windows to empty their ammunition.

A crowd gathered in Plaça Catalunya, and at first it was believed that the anarchists had captured the head of the police. The POUM, the Friends of Durruti Group, the Bolshevik-Leninists and the Libertarian Youth took positions, and after a few hours all of the political parties had taken out the weapons that they had hidden and began building barricades. From that skirmish, battles began in various parts of the city. Several hundred barricades were built and police units occupied roofs and church towers.

The PSUC and the government controlled the urban sectors on the east side of the Ramblas. Anarchists dominated the western sectors and all the suburbs. In the city centre, where the headquarters of trade unions and political parties (installed in requisitioned buildings and hotels) were relatively close, shooting began, and cars circulating were machine-gunned. In the Telefónica building a truce was agreed and telephone communications, which were essential for war operations, were not interrupted. The police, installed on the first floor, even sent bocadillos to the anarchists, who occupied the upper floors. However grenades thrown from the rooftops blew up several police cars. Early in the evening the leaders of the POUM proposed to the Barcelona anarchist leaders the formation of an alliance against the communists and the government. The anarchists refused immediately.

=== 4 May ===
On 4 May, Barcelona was a city plunged into silence, interrupted only by the fire of rifles and machine guns. Shops and buildings were covered by barricades. Anarchist armed groups attacked the barracks of the Assault Guards and government buildings. The government and communist militias returned fire. Fears started over a Civil War inside the Civil War. At eleven o'clock, the delegates of the CNT met and agreed to do everything possible to restore calm. Meanwhile, the anarchists Joan García Oliver and Federica Montseny launched an appeal on the radio to ask their followers to lay down their weapons and return to their jobs. Jacinto Toryho, the director of the CNT newspaper Solidaridad Obrera, expressed the same sentiment. Anarchist ministers arrived in Barcelona, and with them were Mariano Rodríguez Vázquez "Marianet" (secretary of the national committee of the CNT), Pascual Tomás and Carlos Hernández (from the executive committee of the UGT). None of them wanted a confrontation with the communists, and President Francisco Largo Caballero had no desire to use force against the anarchists. Federica Montseny later said that the news of the riots had caught her and the other anarchist ministers totally unprepared.

On the Aragon front, units of the 26th Anarchist Division (former Durruti Column) under the command of Gregorio Jover, gathered in Barbastro to march on Barcelona. However, upon hearing the García Oliver radio broadcast, they remained in their positions. Meanwhile, the 28th Division (former Ascaso Column) and the 29th Division of the POUM, commanded by Rovira, didn't cancel their proposed march on Barcelona until the head of the Republican Air Force in the Aragon front, Alfonso Reyes, threatened to bomb them if they pressed on with their plan.

By five o'clock in the afternoon, several anarchists were killed by the police near the Via Durruti (current Via Laietana). The POUM began to support resistance publicly.

=== 5 May ===
Inside the Generalitat, Tarradellas, backed by Companys, still resisted the resignation of Artemi Ayguadé, which was demanded by the Anarchists. In the end, a solution was reached and Companys achieved a fragile truce between the different groups. To satisfy the anarchists' demands, the Catalan government would resign and form a new one without Ayguadé that would represent Anarchists, ERC, PSUC and Unió de Rabassaires. However, uncontrollable shootings still swept through the streets of Barcelona and caused the death of those who had ventured to leave their shelters. At 9:30 the Assault Guard attacked the seat of the doctors' trade union in Santa Ana Square, in central Barcelona, and the headquarters of the local FIJL. Anarchists denounced government complicity and Soviet interests in that attack on the social revolution in Catalonia. The Friends of Durruti Group published various leaflets demanding the release of Francisco Maroto del Ojo, an Andalusian anarchist who had recently been jailed, and asking people to resist. In one of them, it declared:

A Revolutionary Junta has been constituted in Barcelona. All the culprits of the coup d'etat, that operate under the protection of the government, will be executed. The POUM will be a member of the Junta because they support workers.

Nevertheless, both the CNT-FAI and the FIJL refused to take part in the initiative of that group. At about five o'clock, the anarchist authors Camillo Berneri and Francesco Barbieri were arrested by a group of twelve guards, six of them members of the local police and the rest from the PSUC. Both were murdered during their arrest. The climate of alarm worsened when British destroyers arrived at the port. The POUM feared that a bombardment would begin. (Note: George Orwell, who occupied a POUM post at the front line, shared this fear.) In fact, the British feared that anarchists would take control of the situation, and talks occurred on evacuating foreign subjects from the city. At night, Federica Montseny, Minister of Health and an important member of the CNT, arrived with the purpose of mediating between all of the parties. The Communist Antonio Sesé, General Secretary of the Catalan UGT and a member of the Generalitat's new provisional council, died in a gunfight on his way to receive his new appointment.

The same day, combat occurred in Tarragona and other coastal towns. There too, the Assault Guard proceeded to oust the CNT from the telephone exchanges they had occupied. Similar actions in Tortosa and Vic resulted in a final death toll of 30 anarchists in Tarragona and another 30 in Tortosa. At night, Lluís Companys and then Prime Minister Francisco Largo Caballero held a telephone conversation in which the Catalan President accepted the Spanish government's offer of assistance for restoring order.

=== 6 May ===
At dawn, the CNT once again asked the workers to return to their work to no avail although more out of fear than out of obstinacy. In the afternoon, however, combat resumed. Various members of the National Republican Guard died in a cinema after a shelling from a 75 mm artillery cannon, carried from the coast by some members of the Libertarian Youth.

A force of about 5,000, most of them Assault Guards, departed from Madrid and Valencia towards Barcelona. Two Republican destroyers and the battleship Jaime I, coming from Valencia, reached the port of Barcelona that night.

=== 7 May ===
At 8:20, the expedition of the Assault Guards reached Barcelona and occupied different points of the city. Some came by road from Valencia after they had suppressed the revolts in Tarragona and Reus. Local anarchists had bombed bridges, roads and railways to prevent the passage of the column. That day, the CNT called again for a return to work by proclaiming on the radio, "Down the barricades! Each citizen takes its paving stone! Let's return to normality!" The expeditionary forces that entered Barcelona were under the command of Lieutenant Colonel Emilio Torres, who enjoyed certain sympathy from anarchists. His assignment was proposed by the CNT to promote the return to normality. Assault Guards in Barcelona, Tarragona and many other cities proceeded to disarm and arrest numerous members of the CNT, FAI, Libertarian Youth and POUM who had taken part in the riots.

=== 8 May ===
The streets returned to normality despite some isolated incidents, and the suppression of barricades began. The unrest in Barcelona had finally finished. The contemporary press estimated the death toll of 500 dead and 1,000 injured.

== Casualties ==
There is little agreement as to the number of fatal casualties. The highest identified estimates point to "1,500 dead revolutionaries and barely a hundred 100 dead PSUC members and law enforcement", in total some 1,600 fatalities, provided by former Generalitat security councilor, Artemi Aiguader. The figure of "1,000 dead, and several thousand wounded" was coined in 1940 by an Anarchist exile Diego Abad de Santillán. The American historian Gabriel Jackson, writing in 1970, also notes "about 1,000 victims", though he cautiously admits that the figure might include also victims of later repression.

Numerous sources provide estimates which remain in the range of 400-600. On May 6, 1937, the Barcelona radio allegedly claimed 600 fatal victims. Reportedly "a contemporary press estimate of the casualties was 500 killed and 1,000 wounded", the figures somewhat endorsed in the global bestseller of Hugh Thomas (in all subsequent editions until 2012). In 1970 the Francoist scholar Ramón Salas Larrázabal noted cautiously "I'm inclined to think that there were about 498, although in reality it seems a very excessive figure", and the same year the anti-Francoist essayist Manuel Cruells i Pifarré wrote "es va donar oficialment la xifra de 400 morts; es va parlar, sense desmentir-ho, de 500". However, the figure is referred unconditionally ("confused struggle that eventually cost some 500 lives") in some latest works, e.g. by the British military historian Charles Esdaile (2019). The prestigious scholar Javier Tusell settled for a range when referring (1998) to "the clash, which had caused 400 or 500 deaths". The academic historian Julian Casanova in a compendium by a prestigious British publisher (2019) limits his narrative to noting that "the official casualty figures were 400 dead and 1,000 wounded"; the American patriarch hispanist Stanley G. Payne writes in another compendium (2012) that "possibly as many as 400 people were killed".

The lowest estimates point to 200-250 fatal casualties. Shortly afterwards, in mid-May 1937, the Barcelona daily newspaper La Vanguardia printed that "in total, the number of deaths caused by these events, according to the judicial proceedings, is 221". A very detailed examination, discussed in the monographic work by two Catalan academics Josep Solé i Sabaté and Joan Villarroya (1982), advances the figure of 235 and concludes: "en resum, la xifra total de víctimes a Barcelona és de 218, registrades, 4 de documentades per la premsa que no hem pogut localitzar, 1 documentada per la premsa i pel Registre del Diposit Judicial, i les 12 de Cerdanyola. És a dir, 235". Another monographic work on strength of conflicting sides and casualties by Manuel Aguilera (2013) opts for 218 and provides very detailed further breakdown. The independent researcher José Luis Garrot in one more monograph piece published a table with casualties broken down by day and political affiliation (2020); the total for Barcelona is 218.

== Aftermath ==
The May Days had profound and long consequences. They showed that anarchists would not act with a single voice, unlike on 18 July 1936. A gap opened between the anarchist ministers, who were absorbed with winning the war, and the anarchist youth, who were above all obsessed by the triumph of the revolution. Also, very influential personalities like Escorza or García Oliver had lost control over their own followers. The crisis showed that there could be no truce between Marxist–Leninists and the POUM. The Generalitat of Catalonia was restored to its old functions with the entry of one representative of the UGT (the communist Vidiella), one of the CNT (Valerio Mas) and one of ERC (again Tarradellas). Some of those responsible for the killings were tried later but only in Tarragona, and they were sentenced not to death but only to imprisonment.

The Generalitat of Catalonia, the Marxist–Leninists and the central government seemed willing to act together against extremists by force, if necessary. The new Director of Public Order in Barcelona, José Echevarria Novoa, soon restored normality in much of the judicial system, but in that way, the Marxist–Leninists could take more easily their crusade against the POUM. The republican authorities took no more measures against the CNT and the FAI because of their still-great power and their high level of popular support. The POUM situation was quite different, as the republican government soon outlawed the party, on 16 June, and arrested its main leaders, including Julián Gorkin and Andreu Nin. The POUM would disappear and the anarchists would never intervene in the war as before. Ultimately the internal disputes tore the republic apart and were a burden on its internal unity against the rebels.

Other consequences were the fall of the Government of the Victory, led by Largo Caballero, and the departure of the four anarchist ministers represented in it. It was also a clear victory of Marxist–Leninist influence and power in the Spanish Republicans.

== In popular culture ==
The May Days were mentioned in Ted Allan's 1939 novel This Time a Better Earth.

Films that portray the May Days events of Barcelona include Memorias del general Escobar (Memories of General Escobar), directed by José Luis Madrid and released in 1984, which tells the story of General Antonio Escobar Huertas and his role during the Spanish Civil War and the Barcelona Events, and the English film director Ken Loach's 1995 film Land and Freedom. George Orwell documented the May Days extensively in his book Homage to Catalonia, which details the event as a member of POUM.

The Spanish Netflix drama Cable Girls (2017) also portrays a dramatization of events of the May Days but is set in Madrid instead of Barcelona.

== Notable victims ==
- Andreu Nin
- Camillo Berneri
- Domingo Ascaso Abadía

== See also ==
- List of Spanish Republican military equipment of the Spanish Civil War
- Anarcho-syndicalism
