= Giandante X =

Italian painter, sculptor and anarchist (1899–1984)

- Born: Dante Pescò; 8 August 1899; Milan, Kingdom of Italy
- Died: 17 November 1984 (aged 85); Castelleone, Italy
- Known for: Painting, sculpture, illustration
- Movement: Expressionism, Constructivism

Dante Pescò (8 August 1899 – 17 November 1984), better known by his pseudonym Giandante X, was an Italian painter, sculptor, illustrator, anarchist, anti-fascist and partisan active in the artistic and political circles of Milan during the 1920s. His pseudonym combined his given name, Dante, with the Italian word viandante ("wanderer"), to which he added the letter X as a symbol of his rejection of his family identity. A contributor to the newspaper L'Unità, he participated in the Spanish Civil War, initially as an anti-fascist volunteer and subsequently as an artist involved in the propaganda activities of the International Brigades.

== Biography ==
=== Early life and artistic training ===
The son of Giovanni Pescò and Antonia Felicita Rossignoli, Pescò was born into a wealthy family of textile industrialists. From adolescence, he displayed an independent character and an inclination towards artistic pursuits, which brought him into conflict with his family. Beginning in October 1916, he distanced himself from his family and embarked on a life characterised by frequent travel and the rejection of his family's privileged economic circumstances, although he was still officially registered as residing with his parents in Milan until 1921.

He graduated in architecture in Bologna at the age of nineteen, having studied under Edoardo Collamarini, and obtained a degree in philosophy two years later. He subsequently began teaching architecture, although the details of his teaching appointments remain poorly documented. In 1920, he also organised one of his first solo exhibitions in Milan, where he was introduced by the sculptor Adolfo Wildt. The young Pescò's drawings and engravings reflected the influence of the European artistic avant-garde, Art Deco and Expressionism. His artistic practice soon evolved towards more personal forms of representation, as he sought to reconcile aesthetic experimentation with moral and social questions.

During this period, Pescò adopted the pseudonym Giandante X, which he would use to sign much of his artistic production.

=== Anti-fascist activism in the 1920s ===
During the Biennio Rosso, a period marked by social conflict and the emergence of Fascist squad violence in Italian politics, Giandante began frequenting Milanese revolutionary left-wing circles. By 1921, the authorities had identified him as a member of the Arditi del Popolo, an anti-fascist organisation also engaged in the armed defence of workers' and socialist organisations against Fascist attacks. Following the dissolution of the group, Giandante participated in the activities of the Gruppi segreti d'azione (Secret Action Groups), a clandestine network associated with Guido Picelli, to which he also contributed by procuring weapons. In late 1922, he established a group known as the Cappe Nere (Black Capes), which combined cultural activities, revolutionary aspirations and opposition to Fascism.

In 1922, Giandante published an article entitled Arte e Rivoluzione (Art and Revolution) in the periodical L'Avanguardia, arguing for the social and collective value of artistic creation and contributing to the debate involving Futurism, proletarian culture and the communist movement. That same year, he also published the pamphlet All'universale umanità. La fede (To Universal Humanity: Faith), in which he expressed his conception of art and society as founded on ideals of fraternity, human improvement and universalism. His anarchism was characterised by a strong moral and humanitarian component, linking social transformation to the ethical regeneration of the individual.

In April 1923, Giandante was arrested alongside other members of the Cappe Nere and imprisoned in San Vittore Prison. There he met Luigi Longo, with whom he subsequently maintained personal and political relations. After his release, Giandante remained under surveillance by the Fascist authorities, while continuing his artistic activities and maintaining contacts with Milanese left-wing cultural circles.

=== Exhibitions and collaboration with L'Unità ===
During the 1920s, Giandante participated in several exhibitions and artistic initiatives in Milan, establishing relationships with figures associated with the avant-garde and the Novecento Italiano movement, including Carlo Carrà, Mario Sironi, Aligi Sassu, Bruno Munari, Renato Birolli and Giacomo Manzù. He engaged with these artists through both intellectual exchanges and collective exhibitions. During this period, he also participated in the early editions of the Monza Biennale, presenting drawings, sculptures and architectural projects characterised by geometric forms, monumental figures and a stylistic approach influenced by Constructivism and Expressionism. In 1925, he designed an exhibition room dedicated to the Milanese community of artists and craftsmen, exhibiting under the collective name Nucleo architetti e scultori della comunità dell'arte (Group of Architects and Sculptors of the Art Community), thereby emphasising the collective nature of artistic creation.

During the same period, Giandante drew closer to communist circles and began contributing to periodicals associated with them, including L'Avanguardia and L'Unità, without permanently joining the Communist Party of Italy. His collaboration with the newspaper founded by Antonio Gramsci became one of the most significant experiences of his artistic and political career. Between December 1924 and mid-1926, he produced approximately seventy-five drawings for the newspaper, helping to develop a visual language intended to communicate with its readership of workers and peasants. His illustrations drew upon nineteenth-century graphic art and Russian Constructivism, featuring monumental architecture, geometric figures, symbols of the socialist and communist movements and large masses of workers. They differed from the traditional political caricatures of the period through their strongly allegorical representation of proletarian mobilisation and the revolutionary future.

In 1925, the newspaper's editorial staff organised a collective visit to his exhibition at the Monza Biennale for the paper's worker correspondents. Giandante's collaboration with L'Unità has been interpreted as evidence of the possibility of a relationship between Italian communist culture and the contemporary avant-garde, despite the ideological differences between the artists—in this case, an anarchist—and the political movement with which they collaborated.

=== Engagement with Futurism ===
During the 1920s, Giandante also engaged with Futurism, showing an interest in the movement's formal innovations while maintaining a profoundly different ideological and aesthetic position. In 1929, he publicly intervened during a lecture by Filippo Tommaso Marinetti at the Galleria Pesaro in Milan, describing himself as an "extra-Expressionist-Constructivist" and asserting an artistic conception distinct from both Futurism and the official tendencies of the Novecento movement.

Although he acknowledged Futurism's achievement in identifying the artistic possibilities offered by technological modernity, Giandante criticised its excessive emphasis on machines and the external aspects of contemporary life. He argued that a moral transformation of humanity was necessary and that artistic experimentation should be capable of expressing human interiority. During his intervention, Giandante also addressed political questions, contrasting Marinetti's belief in the emancipatory role of technology with his own anarchist outlook. The ensuing controversy was eventually brought under control through the intervention of Innocenzo Cappa, who was moderating the conference.

=== Exile in France ===
In October 1933, Giandante left Italy clandestinely because of the persistent and extensive political surveillance to which he was subjected. He escaped into Switzerland through the Valtellina before moving to France. This marked the beginning of three years characterised by financial hardship and a succession of arrests and expulsions that forced him to move repeatedly between France, Belgium and Luxembourg.

During his stay in Paris, Giandante established contacts with Italian anti-fascist exiles and the French left, while resuming his artistic activities. In 1934, he organised a solo exhibition and participated in political and cultural initiatives, also collaborating with communist activists in the Parisian suburbs. On 1 May 1934, he was arrested near Vincennes during the International Workers' Day celebrations and subsequently expelled from France. Giandante then fled to Brussels, where he was arrested again and later transferred to Luxembourg. After returning to French territory, he was imprisoned for violating the earlier expulsion order. Following these events, he attempted to regularise his legal status and support himself through artistic and professional work, without abandoning his contacts with European anti-fascist circles.

=== Spanish Civil War ===
Following the outbreak of the Spanish Civil War in July 1936, Giandante decided to travel to Spain to participate in the defence of the Republic against the Nationalist forces led by Francisco Franco. Arriving in Barcelona in August, he initially enlisted as a soldier at the Karl Marx Barracks before being assigned technical duties on account of his architectural expertise, including the conversion of a former convent into military barracks in the Barcelona district of Sarrià.

On 28 August 1936, he took part in the Battle of Monte Pelado as a volunteer in the Italian formation associated with Carlo Rosselli within the Ascaso Column. He was subsequently assigned to the 134th Mixed Brigade and was present during the fighting at Belchite in September 1937. During this period, he met Giuliano Pajetta, who helped arrange his transfer to the propaganda service of the International Brigades in Barcelona. Historical accounts differ regarding Pajetta's role, however, with other reconstructions attributing Giandante's transfer to Luigi Longo, who recommended him following a meeting in 1937.

Within the propaganda service, Giandante worked as a graphic artist, draughtsman and illustrator, producing posters, sketches, paintings and decorations intended for political and military mobilisation. This activity became increasingly important within the International Brigades' communication system, in which visual imagery was used to strengthen the morale of combatants and encourage international support for the Republican cause.

Among the works he produced during this period was the poster 19 Julio 1938 de independencia y libertad, created to commemorate the second anniversary of the beginning of Republican resistance. In another work, Giandante experimented with photomontage, combining images of soldiers, modern architecture and references to classical civilisation to represent the struggle against Fascism.

During this period, Giandante was a member of the Communist Party of Spain.

=== Internment in French camps ===
Following the fall of Catalonia in February 1939, Giandante left Spain alongside numerous anti-fascist volunteers and Republican refugees and sought refuge in France. He was initially interned at the Saint-Cyprien internment camp and subsequently at the Gurs internment camp, before being transferred to the Vernet internment camp, where he remained until June 1942. Even during his imprisonment, Giandante continued his artistic activities, producing hundreds of drawings and several sculptures using salvaged materials, which he left to dry in the sun to create structures resembling adobe bricks.

Among his most significant works from this period was a large sculpted head of Giuseppe Garibaldi, created at the Gurs camp in 1939. Intended for the celebrations of 14 July, the sculpture evoked the tradition of Garibaldian volunteerism and the participation of Italian anti-fascists in the Spanish Civil War. Through its reference to Garibaldi's military activities in France in 1870, it also conveyed a political message addressed to the French authorities. During his internment, Giandante also organised meetings and lectures on the history of Fascism, seeking to maintain cultural and political activity among the prisoners.

On 9 June 1942, he was handed over by the French authorities to their Italian counterparts at Menton, pursuant to measures concerning the repatriation of Italian anti-fascists detained in French camps.

=== Internal exile and the Italian Resistance ===
After being handed over to the Fascist authorities, Giandante was transferred to Milan's San Vittore Prison, where he underwent several interrogations. On 2 August 1942, he was sentenced to five years of internal exile (confino) on the island of Ustica. The following year, as Italy's political and military situation deteriorated, he was transferred to the Renicci internment camp, near Anghiari, from which he managed to escape on 14 September 1943, following the Armistice of Cassibile.

Giandante subsequently participated in the Italian resistance movement in northern Italy. His presence in Milan in the days preceding the Liberation is documented by a pass issued by a partisan formation associated with the Brigate Matteotti. It has been suggested that he served as a liaison between different groups within the Milanese Resistance, particularly those connected with the artistic and cultural movement Corrente, although the precise nature of the individual operations in which he participated cannot be reconstructed.

=== Postwar years and death ===
After the war, Giandante returned to Milan, where he briefly collaborated with the press and propaganda section of the Milanese federation of the Italian Communist Party. Nevertheless, he did not join any political organisation during the postwar period, maintaining a position of personal and ideological independence. Following his return to Milan, Giandante resumed his artistic career, devoting himself to painting, sculpture and graphic art, as well as poetry and philosophical reflection. His postwar works were characterised by a considerable variety of techniques and artistic languages, some of which had developed during his years of imprisonment and exile.

Throughout the 1950s, he exhibited repeatedly in various Milanese galleries, although these exhibitions did not bring him financial success, and he lived in increasingly precarious economic circumstances. His studio on Via Senato became the centre of an increasingly secluded existence, gradually developing into both artistic and social isolation. In 1963, an extensive catalogue of his artistic production, edited by Gino Traversi, was published, representing one of the last significant initiatives aimed at promoting Giandante's work during his lifetime.

On 7 November 1976, the Regional Council of Lombardy awarded him a gold medal on the occasion of the fortieth anniversary of the Spanish Civil War, in recognition of his participation in the anti-fascist struggle. In 1984, Giandante was found unconscious in the courtyard of his residence and admitted to the Policlinico of Milan with peritonitis. He was subsequently transferred to Castelleone, where he died on 17 November of that year. He was buried in the Cimitero Maggiore di Milano.

== Artistic career ==
=== Stylistic development ===
Giandante X's artistic production encompassed numerous movements and styles of twentieth-century art, ranging from Art Deco to Expressionism and from Constructivism to experiments associated with Futurism and Realism. His artistic practice was characterised above all by the search for forms capable of establishing a direct relationship with society and the public, overcoming the division between avant-garde experimentation and political communication.

During the 1920s, he developed a visual language dominated by monumental human figures, geometric architecture and strongly symbolic compositions, reflecting both his interest in technological modernity and his moral conception of art, which he believed should be directed towards the ideal of human emancipation.

His artistic approach subsequently took on more Expressionist characteristics, with greater attention to individual and collective suffering. His production ranged from painting and sculpture to drawing and illustration, as well as posters, decorative works and photomontages.

=== Art as a means of political communication ===
Giandante's collaboration with L'Unità represented one of the early Italian examples of the systematic application of avant-garde experimentation to political communication aimed at a mass audience. His illustrations for the newspaper were characterised by references to working-class culture, industrialisation and revolutionary mobilisation, while retaining an allegorical and monumental dimension distinct from traditional journalistic caricature. During the Spanish Civil War, Giandante further adapted his artistic language to the needs of anti-fascist propaganda, producing images intended for an international audience of combatants and supporters of the Republic.

Giandante's artistic and political activity has been described through the concept of a "partisan aesthetic", emphasising his attempt to combine artistic experimentation, political militancy and social communication without abandoning his ideological independence.

=== Critical reception ===
Giandante's work was appreciated by numerous contemporary artists and intellectuals, including Carlo Carrà, Mario Sironi, Aligi Sassu and Ernesto Treccani. Aligi Sassu regarded him as one of the creators of the Novecento style, recognising the originality of his artistic experimentation in painting and sculpture. Leonida Rèpaci also emphasised his intellectual complexity and political independence, describing him as a figure divided between anarchism and communism.

Rediscovered from the 1980s onwards, Giandante's work came to be interpreted as a point of convergence between the artistic avant-garde, revolutionary culture and Italian anti-fascism.

== Bibliography ==
- Galimberti, Jacopo (2022). "Giandante X: An Artist for Gramsci and the International Brigades (1920–1941)". Artl@s Bulletin. 11 (1): 29–48.
