= Confino =

Confino may refer to:

- A form of internal exile, or geographic "confinement", used as a punishment in Fascist Italy
- Alon Confino (1959–2024), Israeli historian
- Michael Confino (1926–2010), Bulgarian-Israeli historian
- 542888 Confino, a main-belt asteroid

== See also ==
- Konfino
