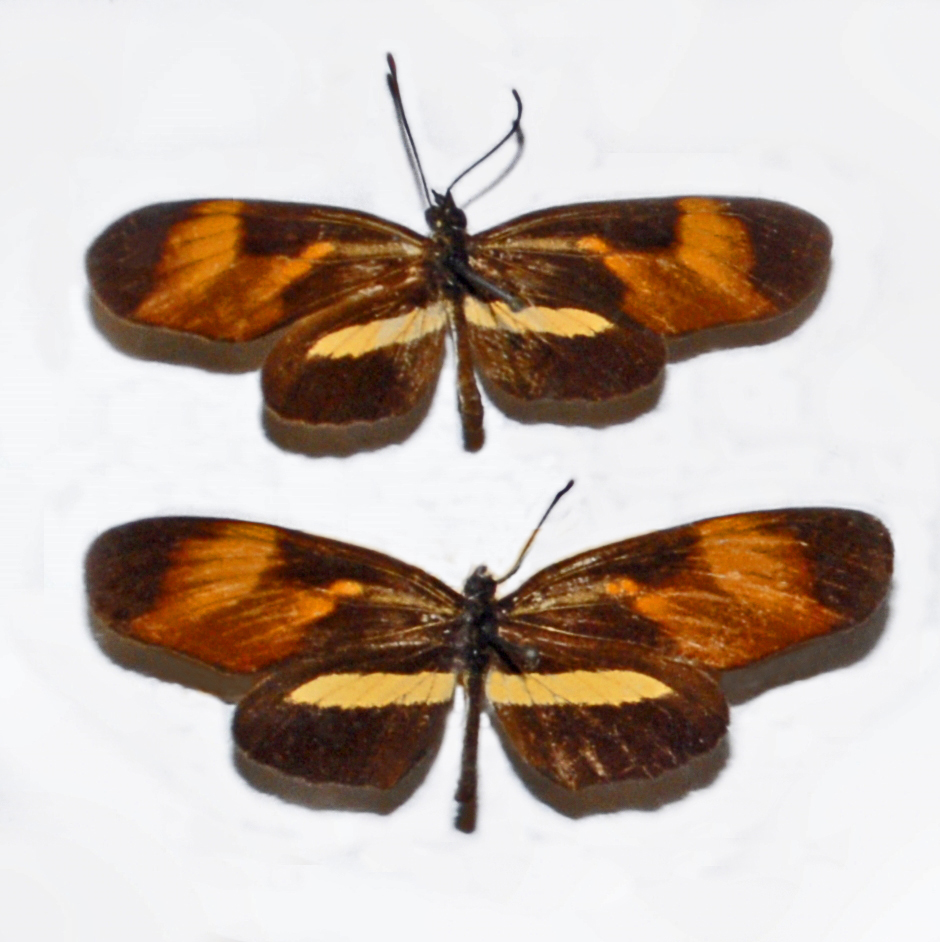
- Upperside, from Paraguay
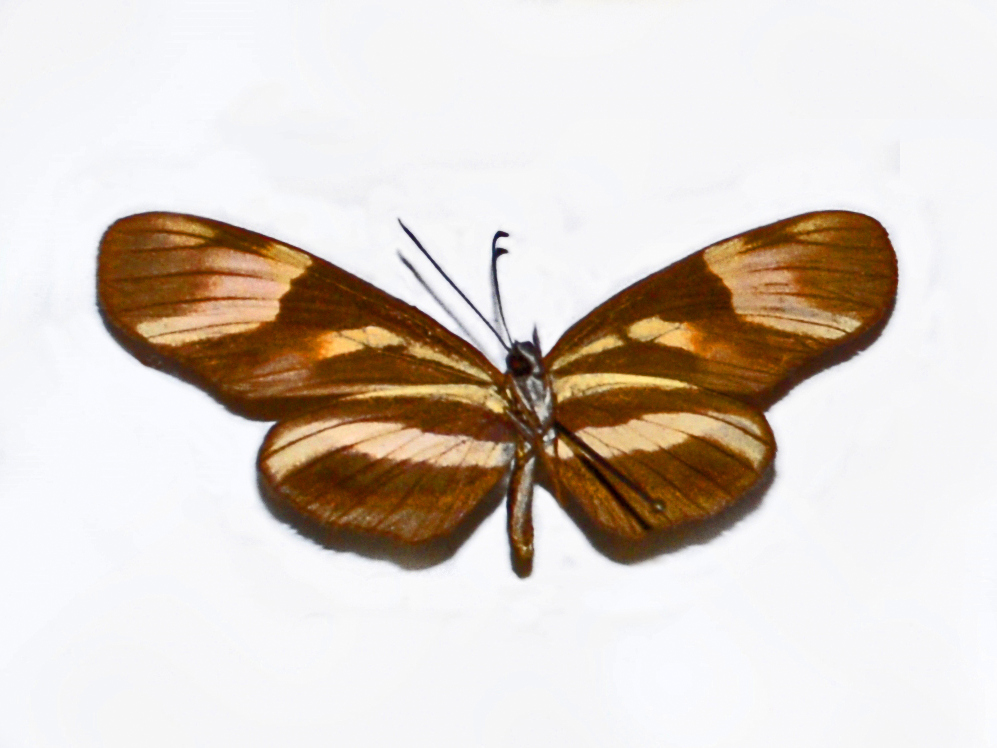
- Underside

Scientific classification
- Kingdom: Animalia
- Phylum: Arthropoda
- Class: Insecta
- Order: Lepidoptera
- Family: Nymphalidae
- Genus: Eresia
- Species: E. lansdorfi

Binomial name
- Eresia lansdorfi (Godart, 1819)

Synonyms
- Heliconia langsdorfii Hübner, 1823; Phyciodes jacinthica Röber, 1913; Phyciodes lansdorfi f. veternosa d'Almeida, 1922; Phyciodes lansdorfi f. sulphurata Zikán, 1937; Phyciodes lansdorfi Staudinger, 1885

= Eresia lansdorfi =

Species of butterfly

Eresia lansdorfi, the false erato or Lansdorf's crescent, is a butterfly of the family Nymphalidae.

== Description ==
Eresia lansdorfi has a wingspan of about 60 millimetres (2.4 in). The upperside of the wings is black. The forewings have a yellowish basal stripe, while the postdiscal area is light red brown, including the costal bar. The hindwings have a pale yellow transverse band.

This medium-sized species imitates (Batesian mimicry) two local subspecies of Heliconius erato (hence the common name) and Heliconius melpomene.

Larvae feed on Ruellia brevifolia.

== Distribution ==
This species can be found in Brazil, Northern Argentina, Paraguay, Uruguay and Peru.
