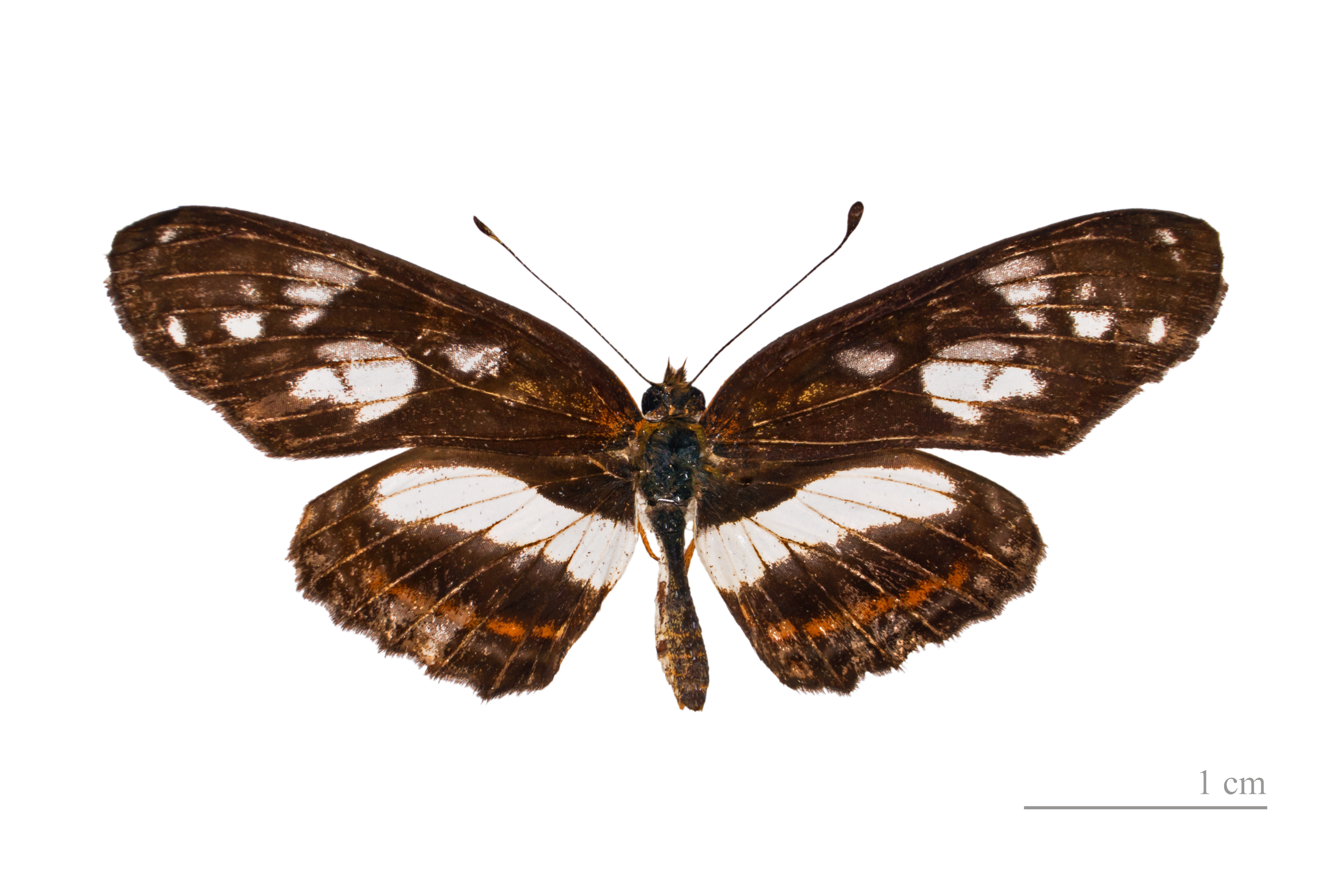
- Dorsal view
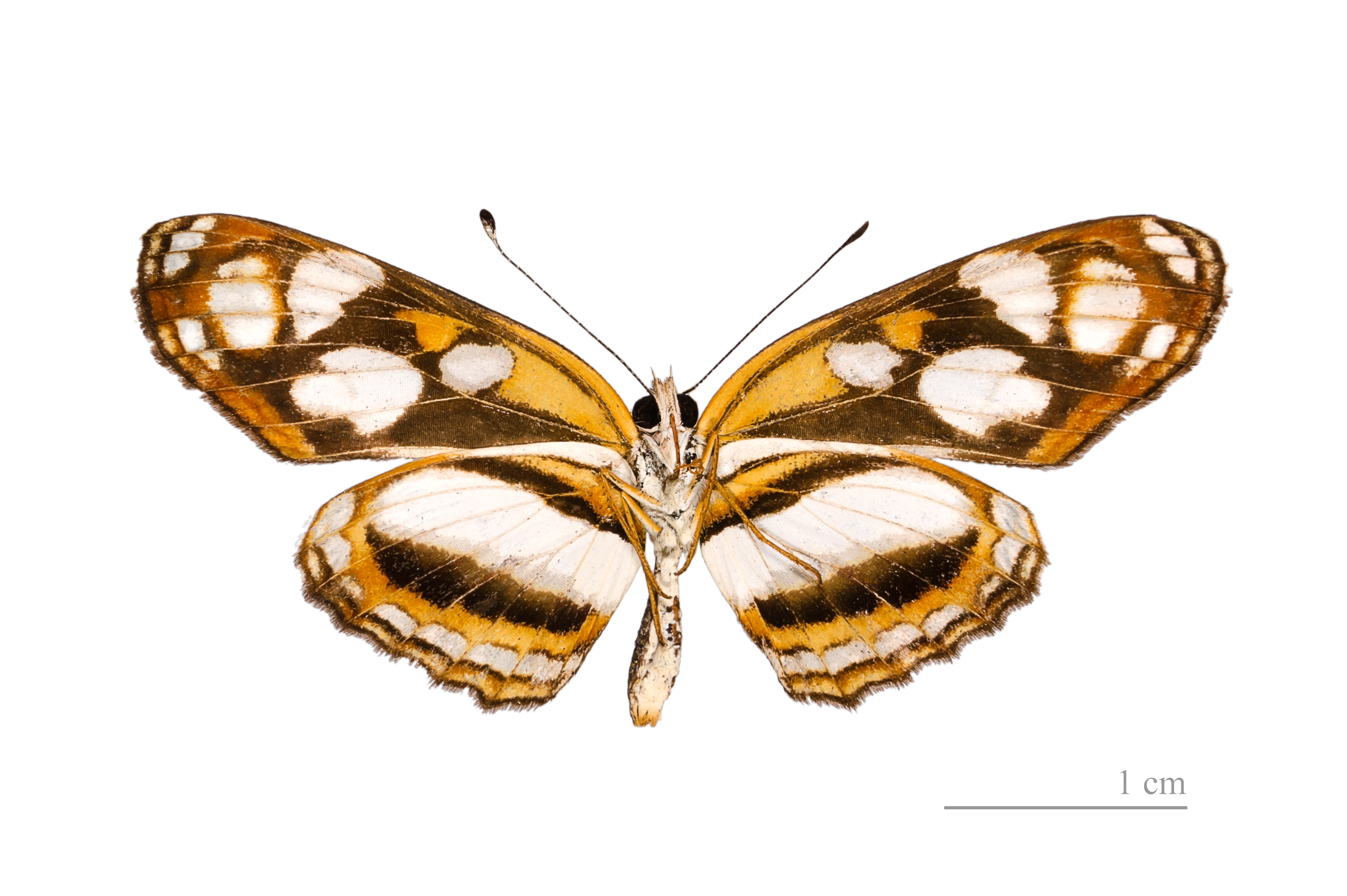
- Ventral view

Scientific classification
- Kingdom: Animalia
- Phylum: Arthropoda
- Class: Insecta
- Order: Lepidoptera
- Family: Nymphalidae
- Genus: Eresia
- Species: E. nauplius

Binomial name
- Eresia nauplius (Hewitson, 1852)

Synonyms
- Papilio nauplius Linnaeus, 1758; Phyciodes nauplia extensa Hall, 1929; Phyciodes nauplia plagiata Röber, 1913

= Eresia nauplius =

Species of butterfly

Eresia nauplius, the Peruvian crescent or Nauplius crescent, is a butterfly of the family Nymphalidae. It was described by William Chapman Hewitson in 1852. It is found in most of the Amazon region. The habitat consists of forest edges with low vegetation, including river banks, forest clearings, glades and roadsides.

The wingspan is about 45 mm.

== Subspecies ==
- Eresia nauplius nauplius (Guyanas, Brazil: Amazonas)
- Eresia nauplius extensa (Hall, 1929) (Brazil: Mato Grosso, lower Rio Madeira)
- Eresia nauplius plagiata (Röber, 1913) (Brazil, Colombia, Peru, Ecuador)
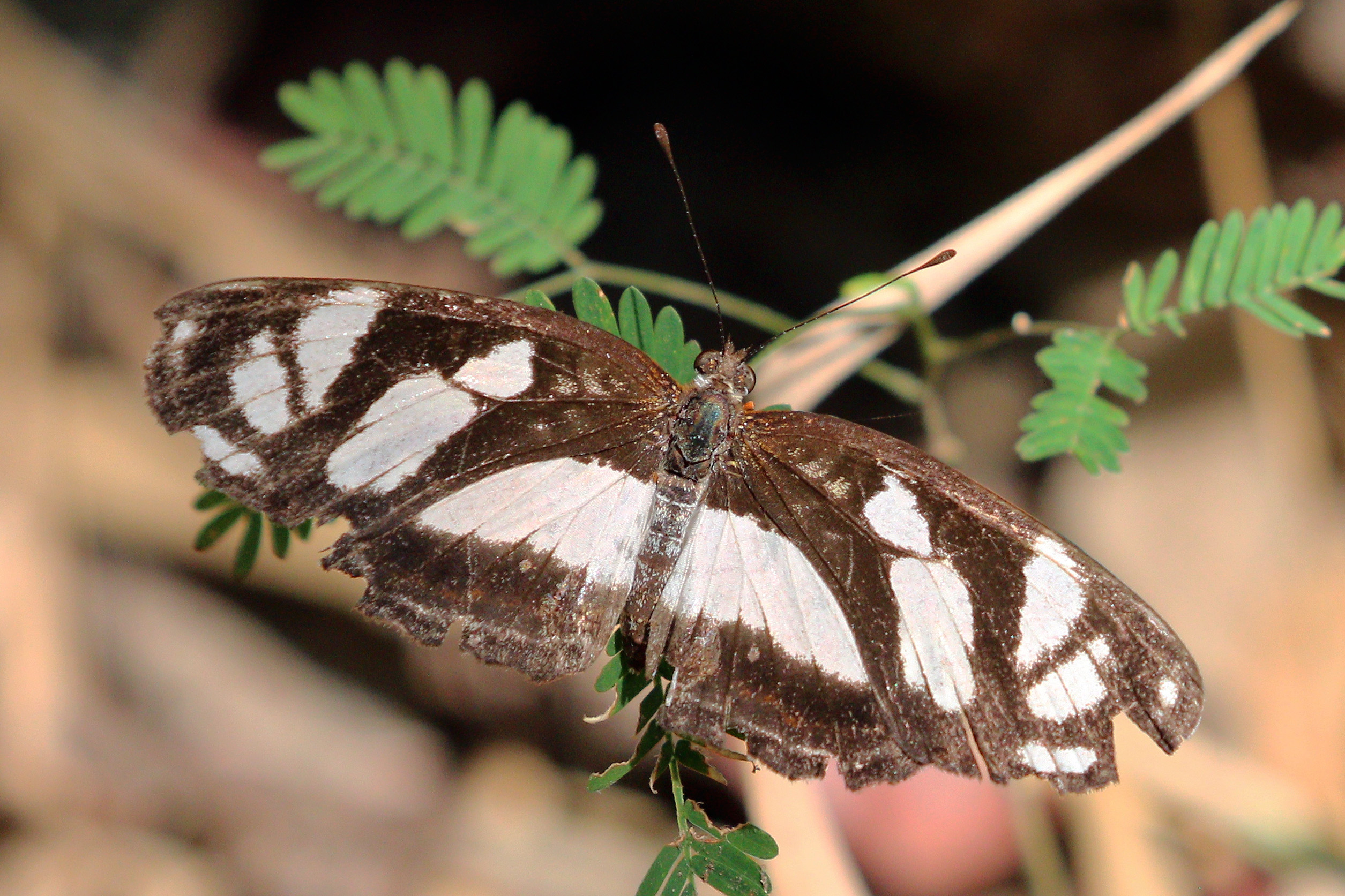
E. n. extensa
Southern Amazon, Brazil

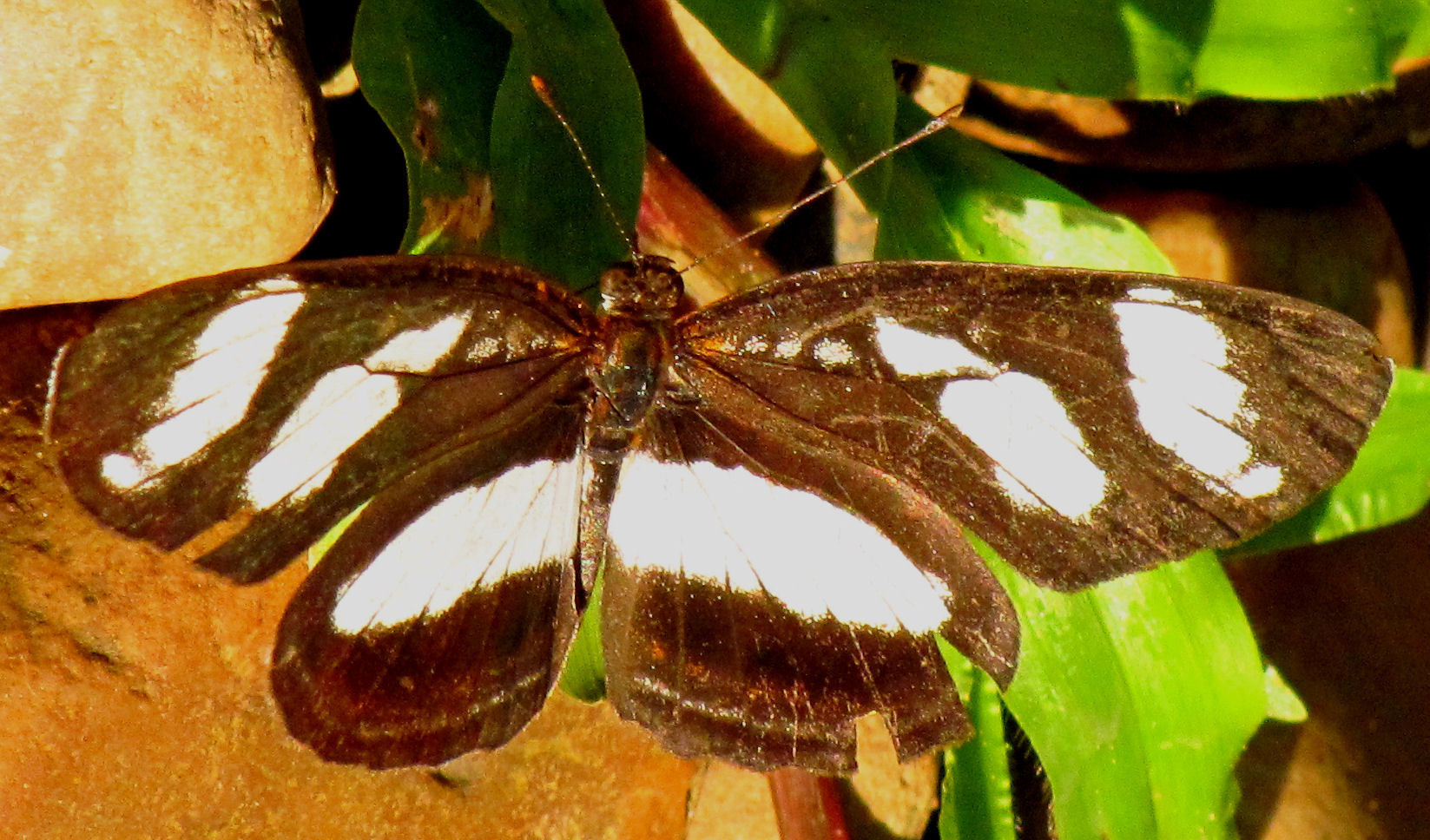
E. n. plagiata
Peruvian crescent
