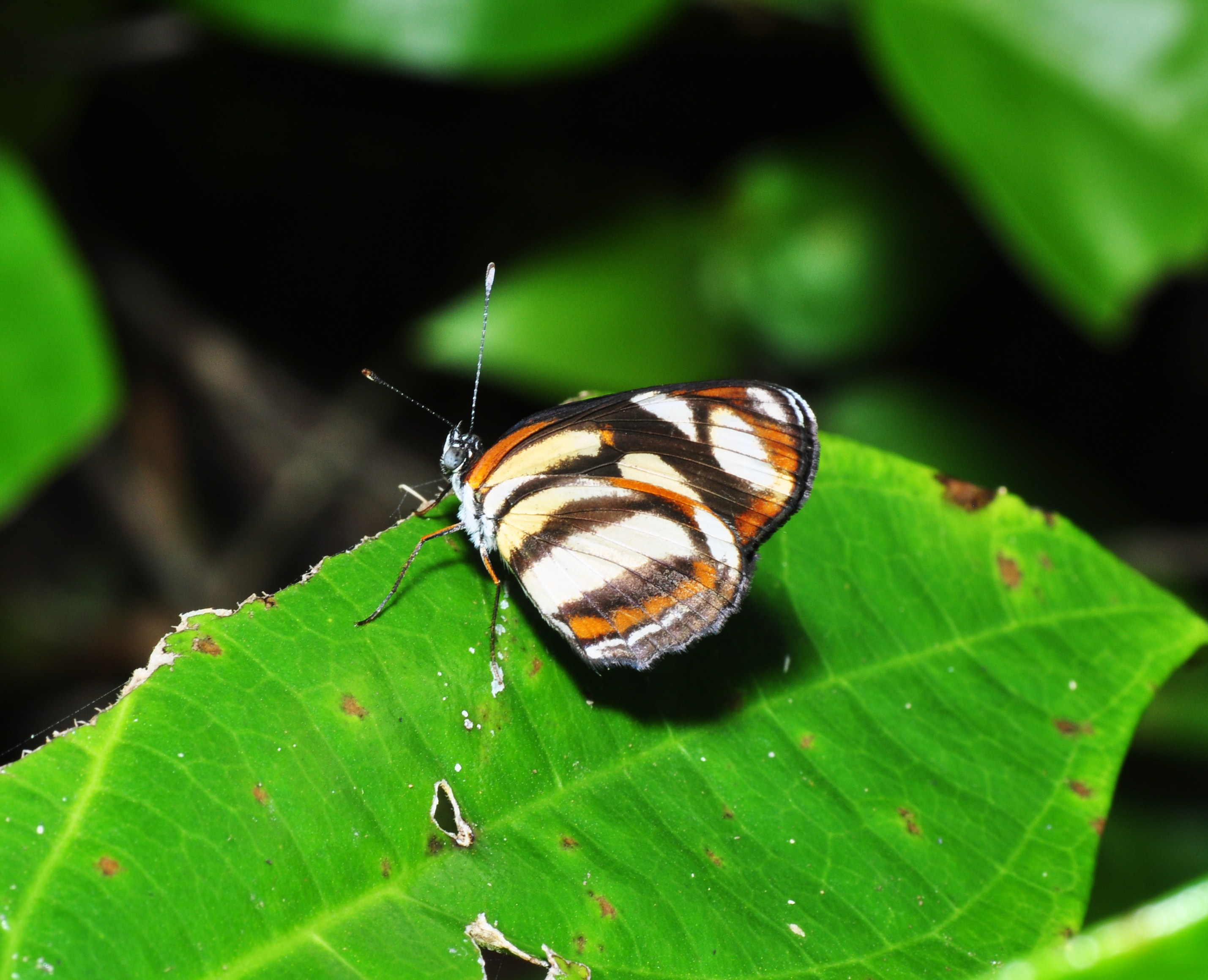

Scientific classification
- Kingdom: Animalia
- Phylum: Arthropoda
- Class: Insecta
- Order: Lepidoptera
- Family: Nymphalidae
- Genus: Eresia
- Species: E. clio

Binomial name
- Eresia clio (Linnaeus, 1758)

Synonyms
- Papilio clio Linnaeus, 1758; Eresia clara Bates, 1864; Phyciodes clio reducta Hall, 1929

= Eresia clio =

Species of butterfly

Eresia clio, the common crescent or Clio crescent, is a butterfly of the family Nymphalidae. It was described by Carl Linnaeus in 1758. It is found from southern Mexico to Peru, Bolivia, the Guyanas and Brazil (from Amazonas to Mato Grosso). The habitat consists of forest edges with low vegetation.

The wingspan is about 36 mm. Adults feed on flower nectar and males have been observed sucking up moisture from damp places.

== Subspecies ==
- Eresia clio clio (Central America to Brazil)
- Eresia clio reducta (Hall, 1929) (Ecuador)
