= Eresia erysice =

Scientific classification
- Domain: Eukaryota
- Kingdom: Animalia
- Phylum: Arthropoda
- Class: Insecta
- Order: Lepidoptera
- Family: Nymphalidae
- Genus: Eresia
- Species: E. erysice

Binomial name
- Eresia erysice (Geyer, 1832)

Synonyms
- Melinaea erysice Geyer, 1832; Phyciodes erysice etesiae Hall, 1929

Species of butterfly

Eresia erysice is a butterfly of the Nymphalinae family. It was described by Carl Geyer in 1832. It is found in French Guiana and Brazil.

== Subspecies ==
- Eresia erysice erysice
- Eresia erysice etesiae (Hall, 1929) (French Guiana, northern Brazil)
