= Aligi Sassu =

Italian painter and sculptor (1912–2000)

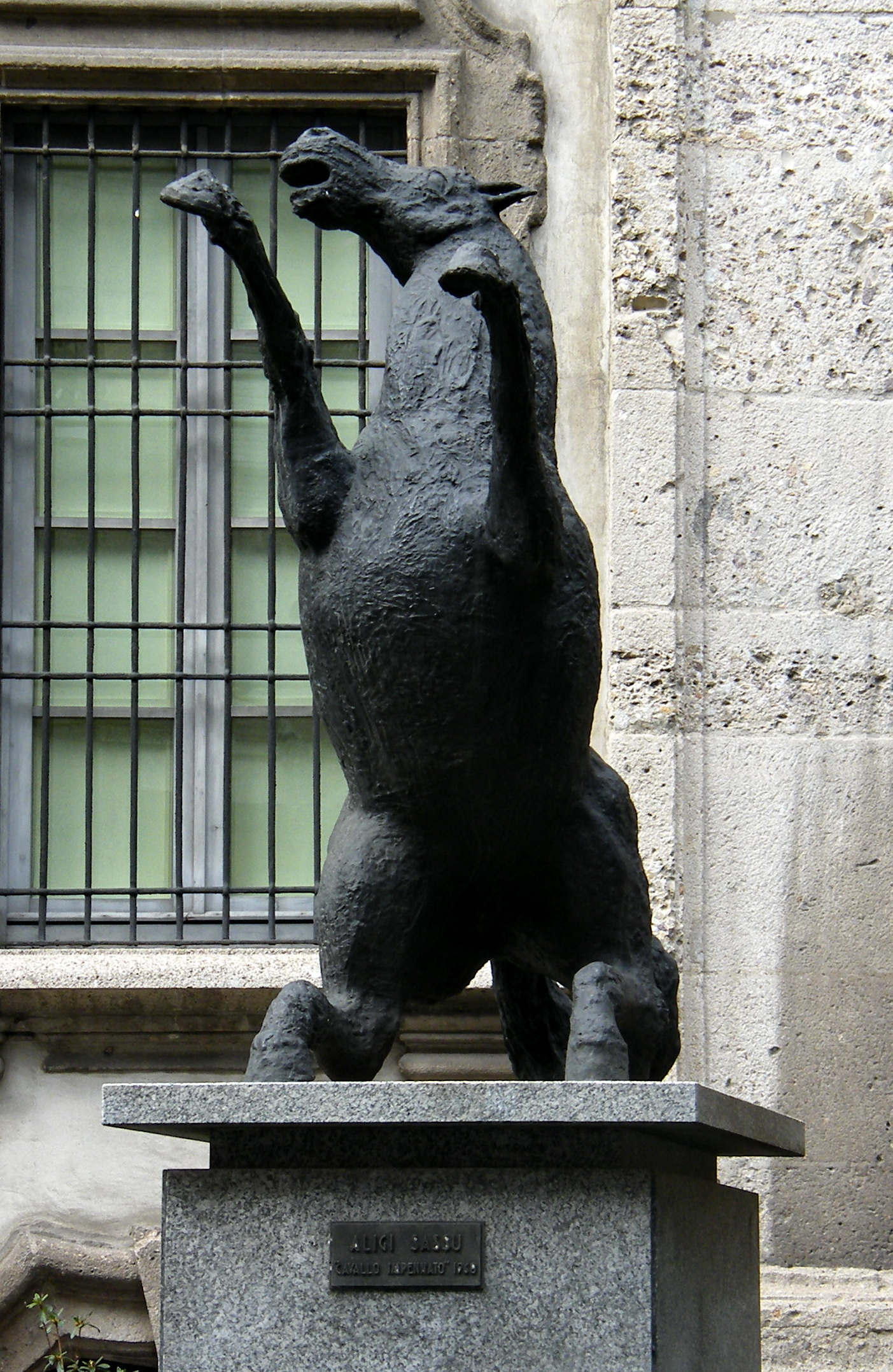
Cavallo Impennato, 1969, Milan

Aligi Sassu (17 July 1912 – 17 July 2000) was an Italian painter and sculptor.

== Biography ==
Aligi Sassu was born in Milan, Lombardy, the son of Lina Pedretti (from Parma, Emilia) and Antonio Sassu (from Sassari, Sardinia). His father was one of the founders of the Italian Socialist Party in Sassari in 1894, and had moved to Milan in 1896, where he married Pedretti in 1911. At the beginning of the 1920s, the Sassu family moved back to Sardinia to Thiesi, where Antonio opened a shop. After three years, the family returned to Milan, where Aligi got interested in art and enrolled to the Brera Academy of Fine Arts. Together with his friend and designer Bruno Munari, he decided to introduce himself to the Futurism leader, Filippo Tommaso Marinetti.

In 1928, he wrote, together with Munari, the Manifesto della Pittura (Painting Manifesto), taking as basic assumption the display of anti-naturalistic forms. He studied Diego Velázquez and the plastic nude. It was in this period that he painted L'Ultima cena, a painting destined to sum up Sassu's visual poetic. In the same year he was invited to participate to the Venice Biennale.

In 1930, in Milan, he met Giacomo Manzù, Giandante X (also known as Dante Perscò) and Giuseppe Gorgerino. In 1934, Sassu started studying Delacroix and the paintings of the Louvre in Paris. In this period he also painted his first horse, a theme that would be recurrent in his future work.

In 1935, he established the Gruppo Rosso with, among others, Nino Franchina and Vittorio Della Porta. In 1936, he finished one of his most known paintings, Il Caffè, as well as Fucilazione nelle Asturie, painted in favour of the Spanish resistance. He joined the anti-fascist cultural movement of Corrente di Vita in 1938.

After the Spanish Civil War, he started studying Vincent van Gogh and moved back to Sardinia for some time. During this period, he made several paintings dedicated to the Sardinian rural life. He also studied mural painting.

In 1963, he moved to Mallorca, first to Cala de Sant Vicent then to Palma, and finally to the village of Pollença. In 1967, the cycle Tauromachie was presented by the Spanish poet Rafael Alberti. Red became Sassu's favourite colour. In 1976, he worked on the frescoes of the Sant'Andrea Church in Pescara.

In 1964, Sassu's work mostly focused on bullfights and the landscapes of Mallorca. He would spend the rest of his life living between Mallorca and Monticello Brianza in Italy.

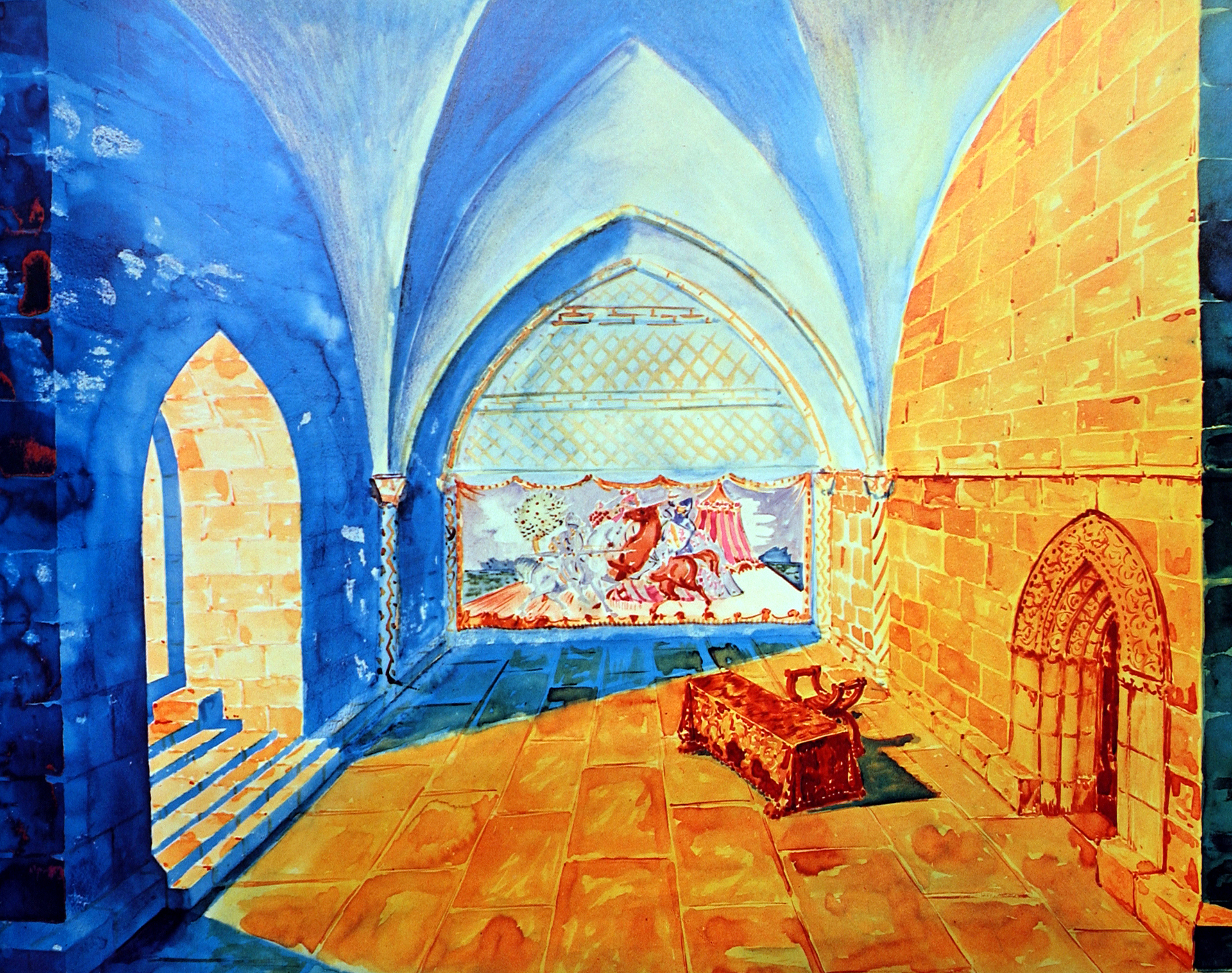
Sketch for the 1973 staging of I Vespri siciliani at the Teatro Regio in Turin

In 1973, he designed the scenes and costumes of Verdi's Opera the Sicilian Vespers for the reopening of the Teatro Regio in Turin. In the same year the Gallery of Modern Art in Vatican City dedicated a room to his work. In 1976 he completed two mosaics for the church of Sant'Andrea in Pescara.

In 1982, he presented 58 watercolours he had originally made in 1943 to illustrate Alessandro Manzoni's The Betrothed.

In 1986, he completed 113 works inspired by the Divine Comedy, three of which were purchased by the Pushkin Museum in Moscow.

In 1993, he completed "Miti del Mediterraneo", a 150 square meters mural for the new building of the European Parliament in Brussels. The following year he presented Manuscriptum, a series of engraves that were included in the itinerant exhibition "The Bridges by Leonardo".

In 1995, he exhibited at the Gallery of Modern and Contemporary Art in Bergamo and was nominated Cavaliere della Gran Croce by the Italian president. In 1996 he donated 362 works made between 1927 and 1996 to the city of Lugano. They are currently housed at the Aligi Sassu and Helenita Olivares Foundation in the city.

On 17 July 1999, the day of the artist's eighty-seventh birthday, a big retrospective on his work opened at Palazzo Strozzi in Florence.

In 2000 Sassu died on the day of his 88th birthday in Pollença.
