= Pascual Tomás =

Spanish socialist leader

Pascual Tomás Taengua (1893 – 4 May 1972) was a Spanish socialist leader. He was a main leader of the Spanish Socialist Workers' Party (PSOE) in Spain.

Born in Valencia, Pascual was the son of a worker who left school at the age of 8 and joined the Valencian Socialist Association at the age of 15 and the Unión General de Trabajadores (UGT) at the age of 21. After the Spanish Civil War he took refuge in France

Between the years of 1944 and 1968 he was General Secretary of the UGT and leader of the PSOE between 1964 and 1967. He resigned as a General Secretary of the UGT in 1968 due to health issues

Pascual died in Valencia on 4 May 1972.

Preceded by Vacant	President of Spanish Socialist Workers' Party (PSOE); 1964–1967	Succeeded by Ramón Rubial
