= Raffaele Schiavina =

Italian anarchist (1894–1987)

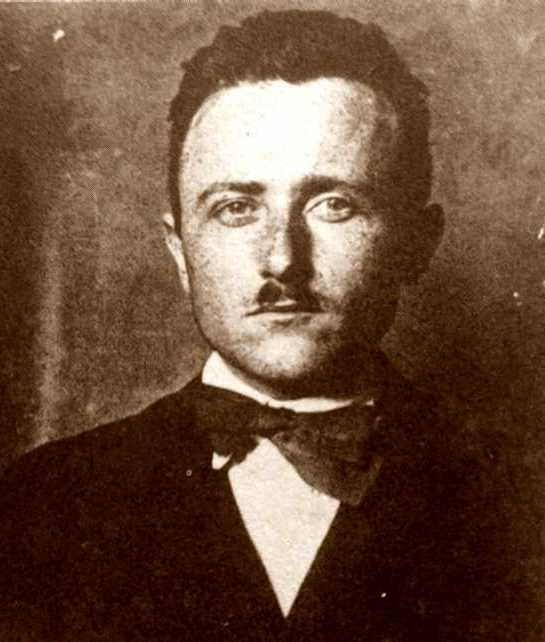
- Police photo of Schiavina following his deportation from the US to Italy in 1919
- Born: 8 April 1894; San Carlo, Ferrara, Italy
- Died: 23 November 1987 (aged 93); Salt Lake City, Utah, US
- Other names: Max Sartin; Bruno; Melchior Steele
- Occupations: Newspaper editor; Writer
- Movement: Anarchist; Anti-fascist
- Partner: Florence Rossi

Raffaele Schiavina (8 April 1894 – 23 November 1987) was an Italian anarchist newspaper editor and writer also known by the pseudonyms Max Sartin, and Bruno. From 1928 to 1970 he edited and wrote for the US-based Italian-language anarchist newspaper L’Adunata dei Refrattari.

== Biography ==
Schiavina was born in the village of San Carlo in Ferrara, Italy to Angelo and Albina Lodi. Having finished school, in 1912 he left Italy for the United States, settling in Brockton, Massachusetts. In 1914 he read Peter Kropotkin's Memoirs of a Revolutionist, subscribed to the Galleanista newspaper Cronaca Sovversiva, and soon converted to anarchism and became a close follower and friend of insurrectionary anarchist Luigi Galleani. In 1916 he became an administrator for Cronaca Sovversiva.

In 1917 Schiavina was arrested for refusing to register for conscription, spending 12 months in prison before being deported back to Italy in June 1919 along with Galleani. On arrival in Italy he was imprisoned for desertion before being released in September 1919 as part of a government amnesty. At the beginning of 1920 he moved to Turin where they resumed publishing Cronaca Sovversiva. In Fabriano in August 1921 Schiavina was arrested and accused of being a member of the militant antifascist group Arditi del Popolo, remaining in prison until acquitted in October 1922.

At the start of 1923, with Mussolini having come to power, Schiavina fled Italy to Paris where he worked as a weaver alongside writing for the newspapers La Difesa per Sacco e Vanzetti and Il Monito. He was active in the French anti-fascist movement and the campaign to free Nicola Sacco and Bartolomeo Vanzetti, authoring the 1927 book Sacco e Vanzetti.

In March 1928 he was smuggled into the United States under the pseudonym Max Sartin. He soon took over the editorship of the New York City based newspaper L’Adunata dei Refrattari, remaining editor until 1970. In 1931 he began a relationship with Florina Rossi, staying together for the rest of his life. The couple took in Clément Duval (1850-1935), the main founder of illegalism – now an elderly man crippled by arthritis who had escaped from French penal servitude. They affectionately called him 'Nonno' (grandpa), leading neighbors to assume he was Raffaele's father. In his final days, not wanting to jeopardize Schiavina's underground status, Duval left their home to stay with another companion who wasn't at risk of deportation, where he died two days later.

Schiavina wrote under various pseudonyms, and regularly used L’Adunata to fiercely criticise fellow anarchist Carlo Tresca, continuing even after Tresca's death. Schiavina died in Salt Lake City, Utah in 1987. Schiavina spent 59 years living under the false identity Max Sartin, fearing that the authorities would identify and deport him.

== Bibliography ==
- Avrich, Paul (2020). Sacco and Vanzetti: The Anarchist Background (3rd ed.). Princeton: Princeton University Press. ISBN 978-0-691-02604-6.
