= Žak Konfino =

Serbian physician and writer (1892–1975)

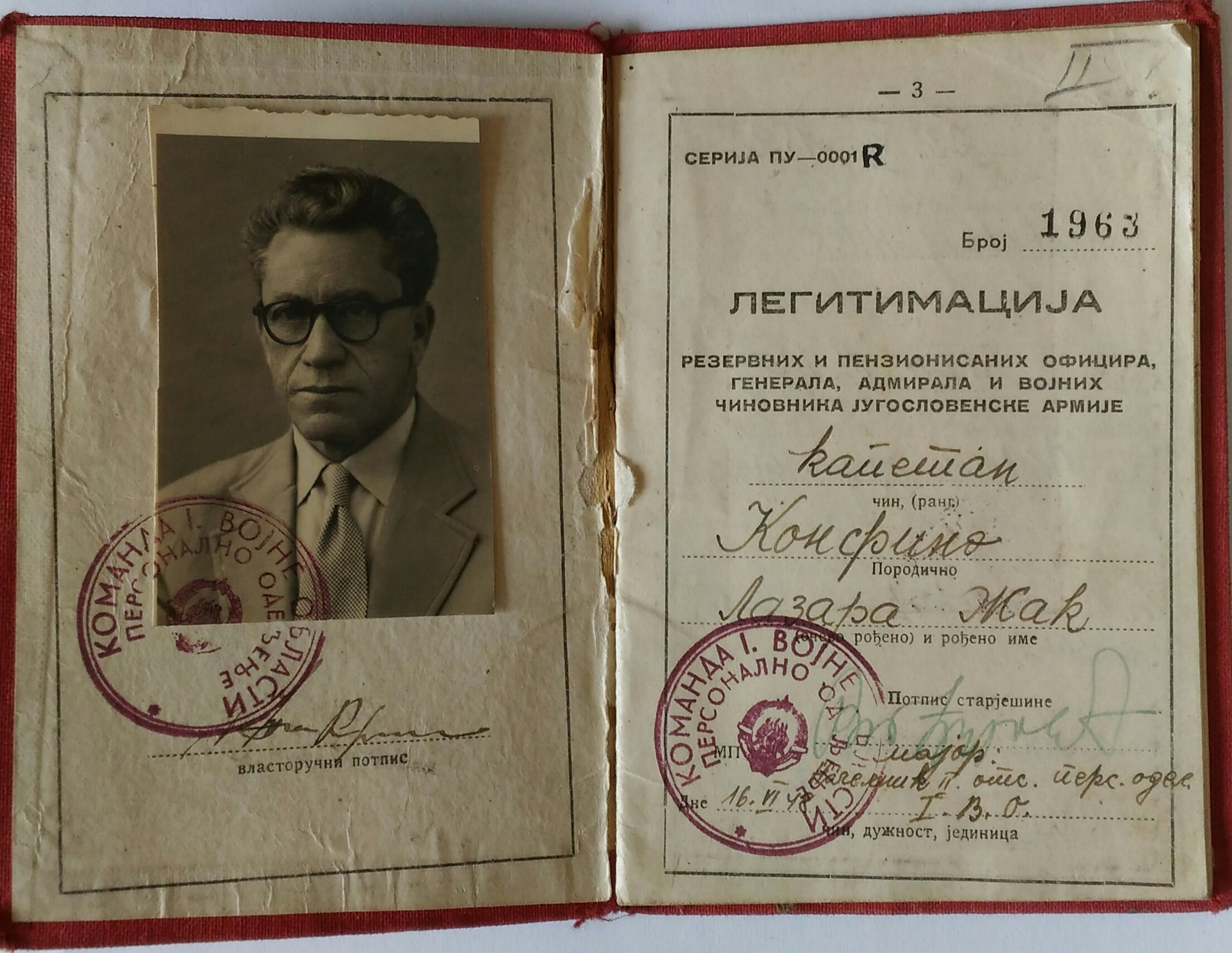
- Konfino's ID from 1948
- Born: 22 June 1892 Leskovac, Kingdom of Serbia
- Died: 16 August 1975 (aged 83) Belgrade, SR Serbia, Yugoslavia
- Occupation: Physician, writer
- Education: Belgrade Gymnasium

Žak Konfino (Serbian Cyrillic: Жак Конфино; 22 June 1892 – 16 August 1975) was a Serbian and Yugoslav physician and writer, publishing a dozen books and short stories throughout his career.

== Life ==
Konfino was born in Leskovac, and belonged to the Sephardic Jewish community that had earlier lived in Istanbul and Thessaloniki, among which part moved to towns in the central Balkans, such as Leskovac, in the late 18th- and early 19th century. His parents were poor, with his father Lazar being a tinsmith and his mother Klara a tailoress. He finished primary school and gymnasium in Leskovac, then was further educated at the Belgrade Gymnasium. He lived at the house of his relative Avram Baruhić. After graduation, he studied medicine at Bern and became a doctor. During World War I, he served as a medical assistant in Valjevo and Leskovac and ended up with the Serbian Army in Albania (the "Albanian Golgotha"). In 1920 he opened a private practice, and in 1926 was a co-organiser of the National Theatre in Leskovac. Konfino got the first X-ray machine in 1924 in Leskovac. In 1928 he and surgeon Dušan Deklev founded the Leskovac sanatorium. He began writing humorous short stories, and published his works in 1932, 1934, 1935, 1937. He then moved to Belgrade in 1936, where he opened a private practice as a specialist in the treatment of asthma and radiology. He was a reserve soldier in the Royal Yugoslav Army, and as such, was captured during the invasion of Yugoslavia by the Italian Army and was imprisoned in Fascist Italy until 1943, after which he lived in exile in Zürich, where he joined the Anti-Fascist Movement of Refugees of Yugoslavia. He worked in Yugoslavia in 1944 as part of the Swiss Aid delegation, and returned to Belgrade after the war. He worked at the Belgrade Military Hospital and also became the President of the Jewish Community of Belgrade organization.

== Work ==
Beginning in his forties, Konfino wrote stories, humorous, travel, and published them first in Leskovac Journal and then the Jewish Life, The South, Politics, the Serbian Literary Gazette, NIN, the Medical Gazette, Hedgehog and others. His works have been translated into Albanian, Czech, English, Hungarian, German, Polish, Portuguese, Slovak, Turkish, and he himself translated works from German and Italian, and understood French and Portuguese.

- Moji opstinari (1934), short stories
- Lica i nalicja (1936), short stories
- Moje jedince (1952), novel
- Lekareve price (1953), collection of short stories
- Siroto moje pametno dete (1957), play
- Nove humoreske (1960), collection of short stories
- Eksperiment (1962), play

== Sources ==
- Kostiæ, Žika. "Lekar, doktor za književnost". jevrejski-glas. Archived from the original on 27 November 2024 – via freeservers.com.
- Tajtacak, David. "Žak Konfino". Makabijada.
