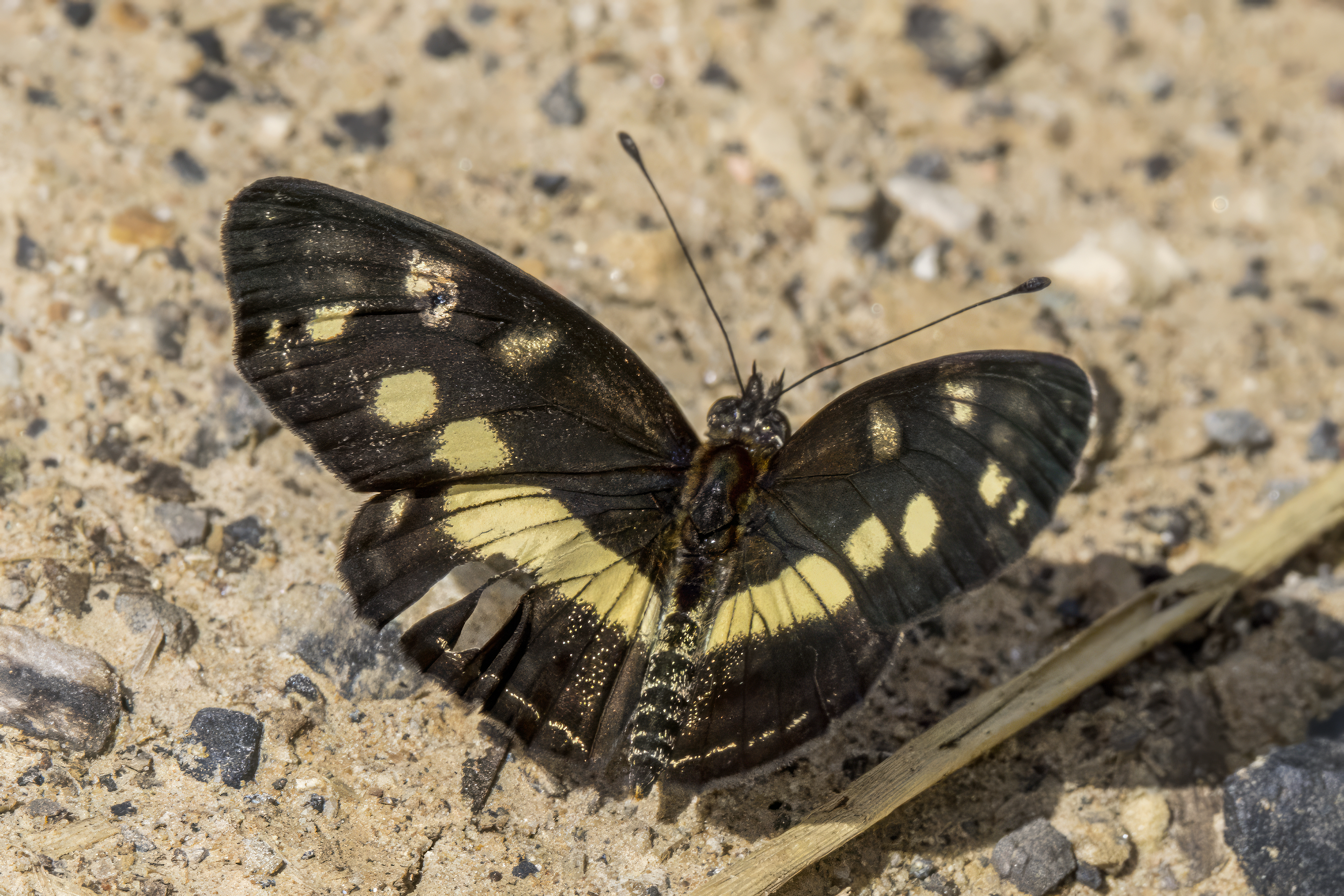
- Eresia polina, Colombia
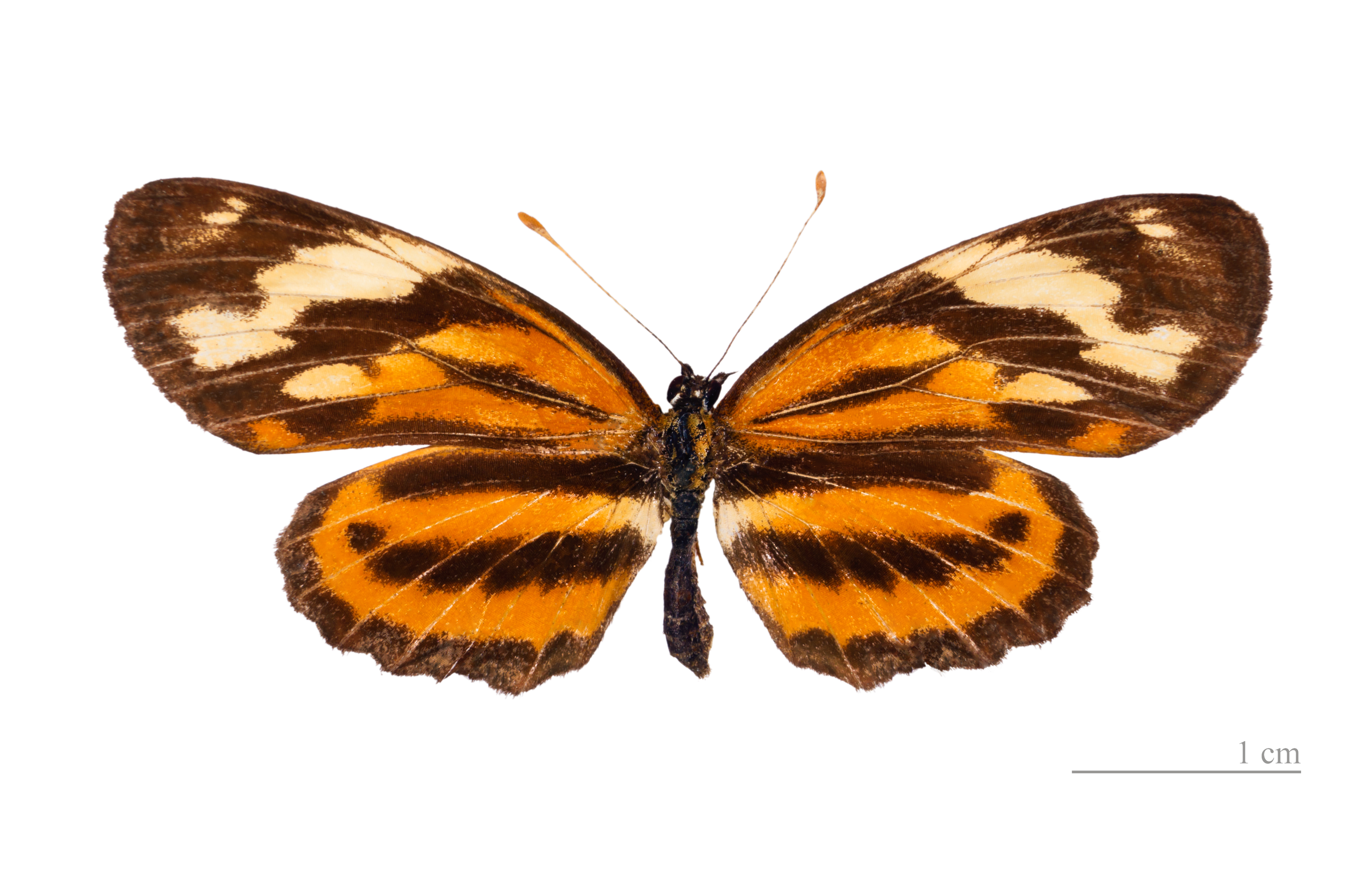
- Eresia eunice eunice - MHNT

Scientific classification
- Kingdom: Animalia
- Phylum: Arthropoda
- Clade: Pancrustacea
- Class: Insecta
- Order: Lepidoptera
- Family: Nymphalidae
- Subfamily: Nymphalinae
- Tribe: Melitaeini
- Subtribe: Phyciodina
- Genus: Eresia; Boisduval, [1836]

Synonyms
- Neptis [Illiger], 1807

= Eresia (butterfly) =

Genus of butterflies

Eresia is a genus of butterflies in the family Nymphalidae found from Mexico to South America. Eresia species(subfamily Nymphalinae) form complex mimicry rings with species of its sister subfamilies Heliconiinae and Ithomiinae.

== Species ==
Listed alphabetically:

- Eresia actinote Salvin, 1869
- Eresia carme Doubleday, [1847]
- Eresia casiphia Hewitson, 1869 – three-banded crescent
- Eresia clio (Linnaeus, 1758) – creamy crescent, Clio crescent, common crescent
- Eresia datis Hewitson, 1864 – Datis crescent, Hewitson's Mimic
- Eresia emerantia Hewitson, 1857 – Emerantia crescent
- Eresia erysice (Geyer, 1832)
- Eresia estebana (Hall, 1929)
- Eresia eunice (Hübner, [1807]) – Eunice crescent, tiger crescent (type for the genus)
- Eresia ithomioides Hewitson, 1864 – three-banded crescent, ithomioides crescent, variable crescent
- Eresia letitia Hewitson, 1869
- Eresia nauplius (Linnaeus, 1758) – Peruvian crescent, Nauplius crescent
- Eresia lansdorfi (Godart, 1819) – Lansdorf's crescent
- Eresia levina Hewitson, 1872
- Eresia olivencia Bates, 1864
- Eresia pelonia Hewitson, 1852 – mimic crescent, Polina crescent
- Eresia perna Hewitson, 1852
- Eresia phillyra Hewitson, 1852 – square-tipped crescent
- Eresia polina Hewitson, 1852 – Polina crescent
- Eresia sticta Schaus, 1913
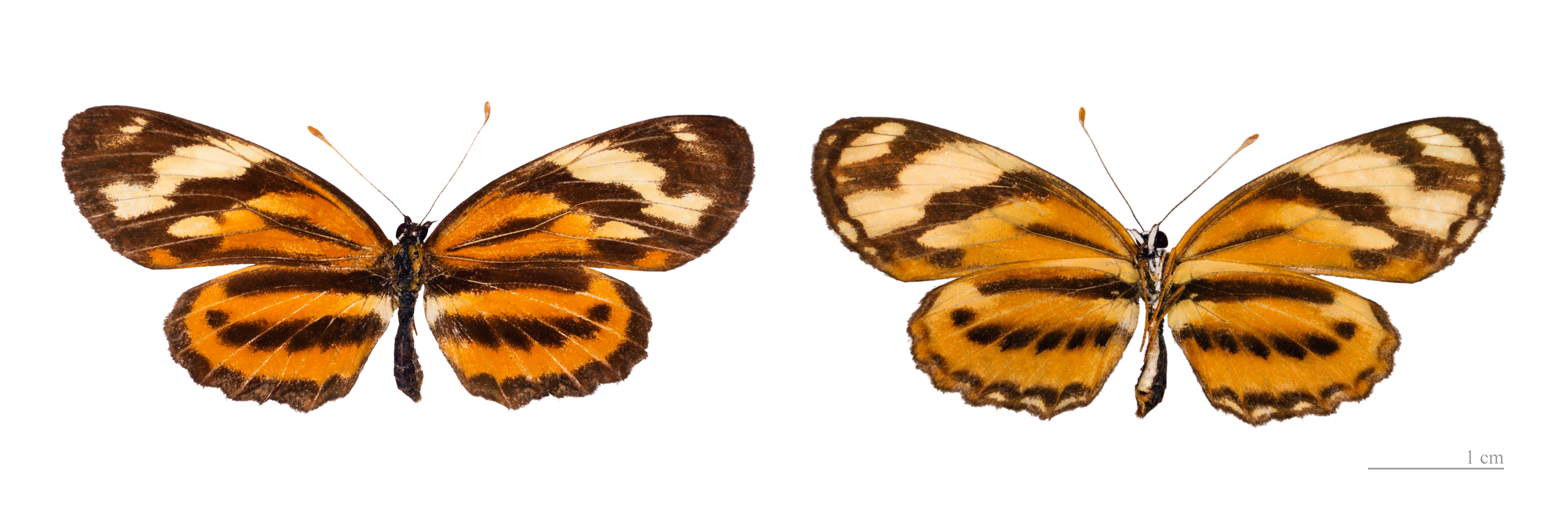
Eresia eunice - MHNT

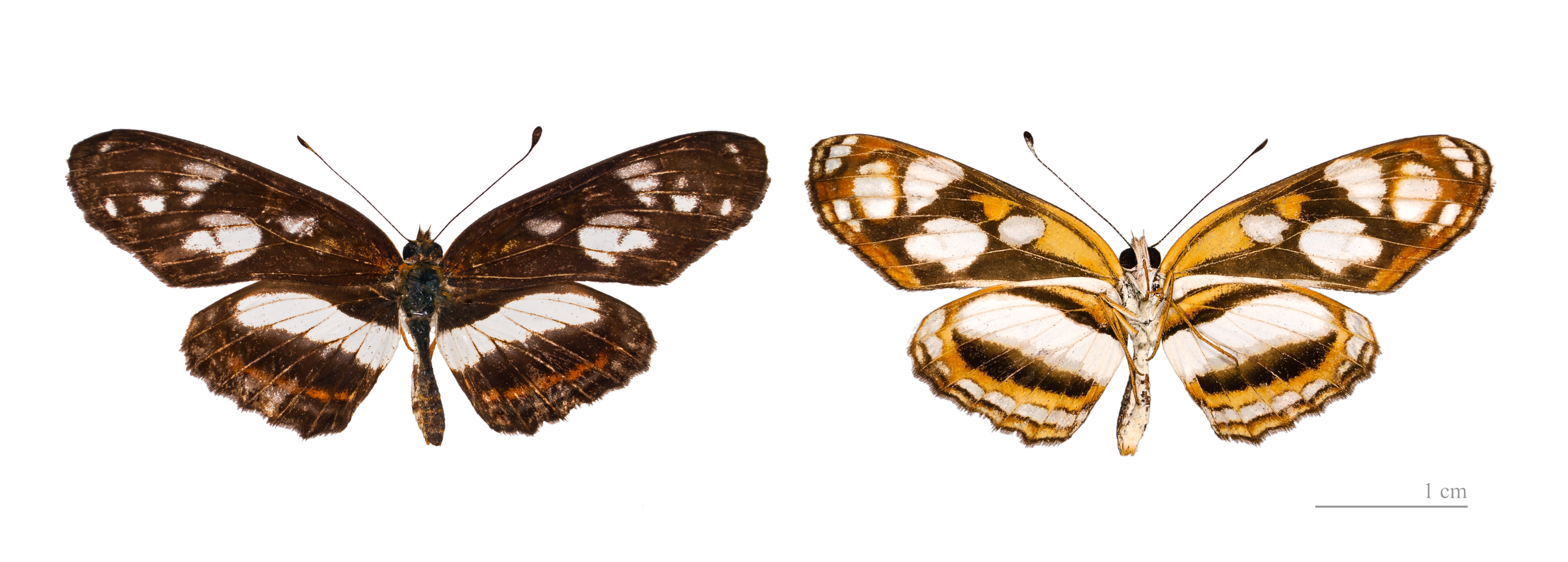
Eresia nauplius - MHNT
