= Ángel Galarza =

Spanish politician (1892–1966)

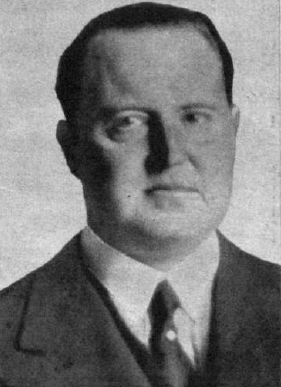

Minister of Interior
- In office 4 September 1936 – 17 May 1937
- President: Manuel Azaña
- Prime Minister: Francisco Largo Caballero
- Preceded by: Sebastián Pozas Perea
- Succeeded by: Julián Zugazagoitia

Personal details
- Born: Ángel Galarza Gago; 4 November 1892 Madrid, Spain
- Died: 25 July 1966 (aged 73) Paris, France
- Party: Spanish Socialist Workers' Party; Radical Socialist Republican Party
- Parent: Ángel Galarza Vidal (father)

Ángel Galarza (1892–1966) was a Spanish lawyer, journalist and politician who served as the minister of interior from 1936 to 1937. He left Spain following the civil war for Mexico. In 1946 he settled in Paris, France.

== Early life and education ==
Galarza was born in Madrid on 4 November 1892. His father was an engineer and politician, Ángel Galarza Vidal (1856-1940).

Galarza received a degree in law from the University of Madrid in 1919. He also obtained a PhD in 1921.

== Career ==
In June 1919 Galarza became a member of the Madrid Socialist Association which was attached to the Spanish Socialist Workers' Party. In 1920 he began to work for the newspaper El Sol and later, for La Voz. Galarza joined a Madrid-based freemason organization. Next year he was arrested for his participation in the opposition movement in Murcia against the dictatorship of Miguel Primo de Rivera. In the prison he met with Marcelino Domingo, Álvaro de Albornoz and Benito Artigas, with whom he established the Radical Socialist Republican Party in 1929. Due to his participation in the pro-republican movement in December 1930 he was again arrested and released from the prison in April 1931. He was elected as a deputy representing the Zamora province in June 1931 for the Radical Socialist Republican Party. When a provisional government was established during the Second Republic he was appointed first Prosecutor General of the Republic and then, director-general for security. He also served as the prosecutor general during this period. Later he was named as the undersecretary of the minister of communications which he held between December 1931 and January 1933. During this period he launched two newspapers in Zamora, La Mañana and La Tarde.

In February 1932, he was expelled from the Radical Socialist Republican Party. He joined the Spanish Socialist Workers Party in 1933. He was elected as a deputy representing Zamora in the elections for the party in February 1936. During the civil war Francisco Largo Caballero formed a cabinet on 4 September 1936, and Galarza was appointed minister of interior. Galarza's term ended in May 1937. He was appointed member of the Court of Civil Responsibilities in October 1937 which he held until February 1938.

== Later years and death ==
Galarza exiled into Mexico at the end of the civil war and was dismissed from the Spanish Socialist Workers' Party in 1946. The same year he settled in France and died in Paris on 25 July 1966. In 2008 Galarza's membership to the Spanish Socialist Workers' Party was rehabilitated in the party congress held in July 2008.
