= Enrico Arrigoni =

Italian-American anarchist (1894–1986)

Enrico Arrigoni (pseudonym: Frank Brand) (February 20, 1894 Pozzuolo Martesana, Province of Milan – December 7, 1986 New York City) was an Italian American individualist anarchist, a lathe operator, house painter, bricklayer, dramatist and political activist influenced by the work of Max Stirner.

== Life and activism ==
He took the pseudonym "Brand" from a fictional character in one of Henrik Ibsen´s plays. In the 1910s, he became involved in anarchist and anti-war activism around Milan. From the 1910s until the 1920s, he participated in anarchist activities and popular uprisings in various countries including Switzerland, Germany, Hungary, Argentina and Cuba.

He lived from the 1920s onwards in New York City, and there he edited the individualist anarchist eclectic journal Eresia in 1928. He also wrote for other American anarchist publications such as L' Adunata dei refrattari, Cultura Obrera, Controcorrente and Intessa Libertaria. During the Spanish Civil War, he went to fight with the anarchists but was imprisoned and was helped in his release by Emma Goldman. Afterwards, Arrigoni became a longtime member of the Libertarian Book Club in New York City. He lived in the US as an illegal immigrant.

During the 1960s, he helped Cuban anarchists who were suffering the repression of the recently established Fidel Castro´s Marxist-Leninist regime. Along with the exiled Cuban anarchist Manuel Ferro, they "began a campaign in Italy itself...They turned to the most important Italian anarchist periodical, Umanità Nova (“New Humanity”), the official publication of the Federazione Anarchica Italiana, with the idea of counterbalancing the undeniable influence of L’Adunata in the Italian-American anarchist community, and more especially of responding to a series of pro-Cuban Revolution articles published in that weekly by Armando Borghi. Umanità Nova refused to publish Ferro's articles (translated by Arrigoni), saying that they didn't want to create a polemic. At that point, Arrigoni accused them of being in the pay of the Communists, and they eventually published Ferro's responses to Borghi. A few months later, Borghi — ignoring the points raised by Ferro — published a new defense of Castroism in L’Adunata, but Umanità Nova refused to publish Ferro's response to it." Arrigoni also translated articles written by Ferro which were published in the anarchist press of France, Italy, Mexico, and Argentina. According to Ferro, “In the majority of our milieus [these articles] were received with displeasure,” owing to the “enthusiasm” with which the Cuban Revolution had been received in them. But in other cases, anarchists rallied to the Cuban libertarian cause. Reconstruir (“To Reconstruct”) in Buenos Aires, whose publishing house, Colectivo, fully identified with the Cuban anarchists, published all of Ferro's works."

He died in New York City when he was 92 years old on December 7, 1986.

American anarchist writer Hakim Bey in 1991 talked about Arrigoni in this way: "Like the Italian Stirnerites (who influenced us through our late friend Enrico Arrigoni) we support all anti-authoritarian currents, despite their apparent contradictions."

== Written works ==
- The totalitarian nightmare (1975)
- The lunacy of the Superman (1977)
- Adventures in the country of the monoliths (1981)
- Freedom: my dream First published by the Libertarian Book Club in 1937, reprinted by Western World Press in 1986, and LBC Books (Little Black Cart), March 2012.
