= L'Adunata dei refrattari =

American newspaper publication

L'Adunata dei refrattari (en: Call of the refractaires (unmanageable ones)) was an Italian American anarchist publication published between 1922 and 1971 in New York City. It was first edited by Osvaldo Maraviglia and later by Max Sartin (Raffaele Schiavina). It was illegally distributed in Italy during its fascist period. The theoretical line tended towards the tradition of Italian insurrectionary anti-organizationalism through the influence of Luigi Galleani who wrote for this publication. The editors of L' Adunata dei refrattari published a collection of Galleani's essays as a book called The End of Anarchism?.
