= Frank Mintz =

French historian (born 1941)

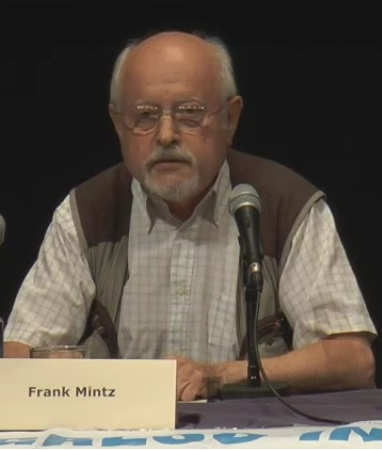
- Mintz, 2014
- Born: 1941 (age 83–84); Montpellier
- Occupation: Historian of anarchism

Frank Mintz (born 1941) is a historian of anarchism and a labor activist.

== Works ==
- Histoire de la mouvance anarchiste, 1789-2012, Éditions Noir & Rouge, 2013.
- Autogestion et anarcho-syndicalisme (analyse et critiques sur l’Espagne 1931-1990), Paris, éd. CNT-RP, 1999.
- Explosions de liberté, Espagne 36 - Hongrie 56, Mauléon, Acratie, 1986, ISBN 2-905691-05-0.
- La autogestión en la España revolucionaria, Madrid, La Piqueta, 1977.
- L'autogestion dans l'Espagne révolutionnaire, Paris, Bélibaste, 1970, Paris, Maspero, 1976.
- Los Amigos de Durruti, los trotsquistas y los sucesos de mayo, in collaboration with Miguel Peciña, 1978.
- (Co-author) Actualité de Bakounine 1814-2014, Éditions du Monde libertaire, 2014, ISBN 9782915514568.
