= Anarchist brigades in the Italian Resistance =

The anarchist brigades of the Italian Resistance were active during the Second World War, especially in central and northern Italy.

== Tuscany ==
=== Pistoia and neighboring areas ===
- The Silvano Fedi anarchist brigade was founded by Silvano Fedi, together with Egisto and Minos Gori, Tito and Mario Eschini, and Tiziano Palandri. It was made up of 53 militiamen, who fought in Pistoia. In addition to guerrilla warfare against the Nazis and Italian fascists, the brigade was also engaged in the supply of weapons for other partisan groups and in the liberation of captured comrades. After Fedi was captured in an ambush, he was replaced as leader by Enzo Capecchi. Fedi later received the Silver Medal of Military Valor. Later under the command of Artese Benesperi, the Silvano Fedi brigade was the first resistance unit to enter liberated Pistoia, raising the red and black anarchist flag on the bell tower of the cathedral, although it was replaced by a tricolor a few hours later.
- The autonomous brigade Manrico Ducceschi, largely made up of anarchists, operated in Lucca and Garfagnana. It captured around 8000 Nazis and Italian fascists, and lost about 300 men.

=== Carrarese and Lunigiana ===
A quote from the ANPI website clearly summarizes the situation in this area:

"The rebellious and anti-fascist spirit of the population could not be different because already in the Spanish anti-Franco war 40 Apuans, two of whom were women, had participated with arms in hand against the Spanish fascists. And what about the heroic commander of the "Elio" formation (Elio Wochiecevich), whom General Francesco Sacchetti, in his capacity as a former soldier of the CLN of Carrara judged: "a fighter for freedom, with courage pushed to the point of recklessness, the Commander who knew how to instill enthusiasm, trust and devotion in his followers by example"

In Lunigiana a well-known and militarily efficient anarchist formation the Lucetti Battalion (to which the song Dai monti di Sarzana refers). The Lucetti Battalion, cited in the book Il coraggio del pettirosso by Maurizio Maggiani, is one of the many anarchist groups on which historiography has given little information. According to Maggiani, not even the Nazis and Italian fascists managed to flush out the partisans of the Lucetti Battalion from the mountains, but only the carabinieri after the Liberation. Other groups were the Michele Schirru (or Lucetti 2) brigade, the Lunense division of the Garibaldi Brigades, the SAP (Squadre di Azione Patrioticca) R. Macchiarini, the SAP-Fai and the Elio Wochiecevich formation, whose deputy commander, Giovanni Mariga, was awarded the gold medal for Military Valor, but rejected it for consistency with the anarchist ideology. Belgrade Pedrini was also involved in the brigade.

== Lombardy ==
In Milan, in addition to some minor groups, the anarchist formation with the greatest operational weight was the Bruzzi-Malatesta brigade.

== Piedmont ==
In industrial Turin, with a training base within Fiat, the anarchist brigade 33rd battaglione SAP Pietro Ferrero fought against the Nazis and Italian fascists. Among the fallen of the brigade were Dario Cagno, shot as co-responsible for the killing of the high ranking fascist Domenico Giardina, and Ilio Baroni, who Torino honored with a plaque, formerly a fighter in the Arditi del Popolo in Piombino and who died during the insurrection in Piedmontese Ironworks.

== Emilia-Romagna ==
=== Bologna, Modena, Reggio Emilia ===
Primo Bassi from Imola, Vindice Rabitti, Ulisse Merli, Aladino Benetti and Attilio Diolaiti, shot in 1944 at the Certosa, operated in the areas of Bologna and Modena and are known for the number and importance of their military actions; Diolaiti is a particularly important figure as he organized and participated in the first partisan brigades of Imola, serving in the Garibaldi Brigade Alessandro Bianconcini, and was also present in Bologna with the Fratelli Bandiera formation and with the 7th GAP. In Reggio Emilia, the 26th Garibaldi Brigade was named after Enrico Zambonini, an anarchist partisan in contact with the Cervi brothers. Zambonini, captured together with Don Pasquino Borghi and other partisans, was sentenced to death by the Special Court of Reggio Emilia and shot. In front of the firing squad, as a sign of contempt and defiance of his executioners, he shouted: "Long live Anarchy!". In the town square of Villa Minozzo, his town of origin, a plaque was placed in his memory.

== Liguria ==
=== Background ===
Liguria already a few years before the Second World War had made a significant contribution to the anti-fascist struggle, with the participation of many anarchists in the Spanish Civil War. Among the anarchists that remained in Liguria, Wanda Lizzari and Giuseppe Lapi ended up in confinement on charges of carrying out illegal fundraising. After 8 September 1943, Ligurian anti-fascist militiamen veterans of the Spanish war, including those who ended up in French internment camps after the retreat of the Spanish republican forces, took part in the Resistance, whose preparations had already been going on since the previous year.

=== Genoa ===
One of the first moments of revolt against the Nazis and Italian fascists in Genoa had among its protagonists the anarchist Eugenio Maggi of Sestri Ponente. Anti-fascist sentiments were alive in the city, just as the memory of the Defense of the Chamber of Labor by the Arditi del Popolo and the proletarian defense formations in Genoa was still recent. After 8 September 1943, the people of Genoa started to collect weapons abandoned by the Germans. September 11 can be considered as the starting date of the Resistance in the city of Genoa, when a German unit, informed of the presence of an abandoned weapons depot in Andrea Costa street, rushed to take it but was intercepted by a team from Sestri including Maggi and his companions Vittorio Zecca and Giacomo Pittaluga. The anti-fascists surrounded the German unit and a fight began. The partisans managed to blow up the truck carrying the weapons but, although they were more than the Germans, they were worse armed and were therefore forced to retreat. Maggi took refuge inside the kiosk of a newsstand in Viale Canepa (on December 5, 2003, Maggi would suddenly die a few steps away from that newsstand that had saved him over half a century earlier). Maggi then became a militant of the SAP Errico Malatesta brigade, under the command of Antonio Dettori and an emanation of the Federation of Libertarian Communists. Vittorio Zecca joined the Langhe Autonomous Brigade while Giacomo Pittaluga served in the Garibaldi Coduri Division, which fought in Tigullio. In addition to the aforementioned anarchist formations, there was the SAP Crosa brigade of Genova Nervi, in which participated Lorenzo Parodi, who later, after a first experience in GAAP (Anarchist Action Proletarian Groups) became one of the most charismatic leaders of Lotta Comunista. Action teams of the Libertarian Communist Federation operated on the Genoa-Arenzano route. Individually, Marcello Bianconi (a member of the CLN of Pontedecimo), Emilio Grassini (of the SAP "Errico Malatesta" formation who worked in Sestri, Cornigliano, Sampierdarena), Caviglia, Sardini, Pittaluga are still remembered for their contribution in the anti-fascist struggle.

== Lazio ==
Based in the Monte Sacro district of Rome, Fantini was one of the organizers of the Resistance in the area. He was a militant of the socialist circle of Coppito in his youth and later he joined the anarchist movement active in the Aquila area. After emigrating to the US in 1910, where he met Sacco and Vanzetti, he returned to Italy and between 1921 and 1922 he organized support committees in favor of the two anarchists on trial in the US, which resulted to him being filled by the police. He then moved to the Marche and then to Rome where, in 1943, in the middle of the Resistance, he was captured by the Nazis due to a report and subsequently shot in Forte Bravetta.

The other formations in which the anarchists participated were mainly those of Justice and Freedom and of the Red Flag. The Justice and Freedom brigades were led by Vincenzo Baldazzi, a friend of Aldo Eluisi, a shareholder but ideologically very close to the anarchist movement. The two, linked by an old and deep friendship, had been founders of the Arditi del Popolo, both coming from the ranks of the Arditi. Baldazzi had been a pupil of Errico Malatesta. Anarchists such as Raffaele De Luca and Umberto Scattoni were active in the Red Flag brigades.

== Notable members ==
Gold Medal of Military Valour:

- Lanciotto Ballerini
- Mario Betto
- Giuseppe Bifolchi
- Pasquale Binazzi
- Armando Borghi
- Pietro Bruzzi
- Emilio Canzi
- Arrigo Cervetto

Silver Medal of Military Valor:

- Giovanni Domaschi
- Nardo Dunchi
- Alfonso Failla
- Augusta Farvo
- Silvano Fedi
- Gogliardo Fiaschi
- Gino Lucetti
- Eugenio Maggi
- Mario Mantovani
- Giovanni Mariga

Bronze Medal of Military Valor:

- Umberto Marzocchi
- Ugo Mazzucchelli
- Lorenzo Parodi
- Mario Orazio Perelli
- Umberto Scattoni
- Elio Wockievic
