= Ugo Mazzucchelli =

Italian partisan (1903–1997)

- Born: 5 June 1903; Carrara, Tuscany, Italy
- Died: 6 January 1997 (aged 93); Carrara, Tuscany, Italy
- Occupations: Marble quarryman Anarchist activist resistance activist Partisan leader
- Spouse: Giuseppina Michelini
- Children: Alfredo; Alvaro; Carlo; Manrica
- Parent(s): Ariodante Mazzucchelli; Lorè Amelia ______

Ugo Mazzucchelli (5 June 1903 – 6 January 1997) was an Italian anarchist, anti-fascist and wartime partisan leader. He is best remembered as the commander of the Lucetti Battalion which became known as a tough opponent for the German and Fascist forces, when Italy became a critical battleground between 1943 and 1945, following the arrest of Mussolini.

== Biography ==
=== Provenance and early years ===
Ugo Mazzucchelli was the second of his parents' five sons, born into a large working-class family in Tuscany at Carrara, a prosperous midsized town, well known for the marble quarries in the surrounding hills and, among the politically engaged, as a long-standing hotbed of anarchism. Ariodante Mazzucchelli, his father, was a quarryman and a powerful influence throughout and beyond his childhood. After completing his basic schooling, Ugo Mazzucchelli was sent to work in the quarries nearby. Italy became inveigled in the war during 1915, and in 1917 Mazzucchelli's family sent the boy to help behind the frontline, where he joined a "youth team" deployed to bury the bodies of dead fighting men after the slaughter at Caporetto. This would have meant one mouth fewer for the family to feed and a few more lire for the family budget.

On his return to Carrara, he resumed his work in the marble quarries. Around this time Mazzucchelli came into contact with the anarchist-philosopher and trades union activist Alberto Meschi, by whom he became and remained fascinated, and the local "Chamber of Labour" (Note: The "Camere del Lavoro" were locally or regionally based workers' organisations that had much in common with the trades unions emerging further to the north in Europe, but which tended to have closer links with the local communities in which they operated.) He would already have been conscious of the intensifying social and political conflicts of the immediate post-war period, since the marble quarries of Carrera had long been powerfully politicised: it is apparent that his political awareness was further raised through his contacts with Meschi. By the time he was eighteen, Mazzucchelli had moved with his family to Nazzano, which at that time was a separate municipality just outside Carrara (into which it has subsequently been subsumed). He became an eager reader of the left-wing "anarchist" leaflets passed to him by Natale Romiti, an old comrade from nearby Pontremoli, and of the periodical "Cavatore", published by the Carrara "Chamber of Labour". He also teamed up with a number of like-minded young men to set up "Né Dio né padrone" (loosely, "No God, No boss"), an anarchist youth group which can also be seen as a version of the Arditi del Popolo and other proletarian anti-fascist groups emerging across northern and central Italy in reaction (supporters and sympathisers assert) to the Fascist paramilitary organisation launched (in the first instance) in Milan in 1919 by Benito Mussolini.

=== Arrest and imprisonment ===
On the night of 19/20 June 1921, in the aftermath of the so-called "Biennio Rosso" ("two red years"), Ugo Mazzucchelli was one of approximately fifteen young men who became involved in a gunfight with a Carabinieri (armed police) unit. The incident ended in the arrest of Mazzucchelli and the other anarchist gunmen. The incident arose after the comrades had taken up positions around the offices of the local "Lega Cavatori e Segatori" (trades union organization) in order to defend the building from an anticipated attack by Fascist paramilitaries. Their plans were ruined when a unit of Carabinieri turned up in place of the expected Fascists. Six months later, the anarchist gunmen faced trial, and were each sentenced to twenty-six months and nineteen days. On top of that, there was a fine to pay of 150 lire and a supplementary statutory penalty (pena pecuniara) of 106 lire. In March 1922 an appeal court in Genoa reduced his prison sentence to one of nine months and fourteen days, while the total fine was reduced to 150 lire. Mazzucchelli served his sentence in a succession of prisons in Massa, Lucca, Pisa e Genoa.

=== Release and ostracism ===
On his release, he returned home to Nazzano. He found that during his absence Fascism had become more mainstream in the villages and towns around Carrara. The Fascist gangs had become powerful only after a succession of violent confrontations, but they had nevertheless managed to attract support from large numbers of manual workers, and particularly from among the non-unionized unemployed. Nazzano was now controlled by a fascist squastrista (later a government minister) called Renato Ricci, who was well aware of Mazzucchelli's record of antifascist activism, and had no intention of allowing such a man back into the Nazzano community. Forced out of Nazzano, Mazzucchelli tried to find quarry work in Seravezza, along the coast beyond Massa to the south, but there was no work to be had in Serravezza either, so he returned to Carrara. There he found the fascists as unforgiving as before. He later sought and found refuge with a cousin in Pianamaggio. It was here that he met Giuseppina Michelini, whose brother Arturo Michelini was an anarchist comrade treacherously killed by fascists. Ugo Mazzucchelli and Giuseppina "Peppa" Michelini teamed up during the early 1920s and subsequently married. It is not clear whether it was before or after meeting Giuseppina that in desperation Ugo Mazzucchelli tried to escape along the coast into France. However, he had evidently failed to obtain the necessary permits, since after someone betrayed him to the authorities, he was stopped and repatriated.

This was followed by a lengthy period of hiding, inland in the Apuan Alps. He lived with a number of other semi-outlaws in the countryside near the Lorano quarry. The Mussolini government had taken power in October 1922. Mazzucchelli's political record and continuing refusal to contemplate joining the party made him a "legitimate target" for discrimination and persecution. Sometimes there was casual work available at the quarry, generally restricted to the more off-beat or dangerous jobs, and despite a boycott by the quarry owners, who would not have considered formally employing a "left-wing subversive" who openly thought of May Day as a public holiday. From time to time, Mazzucchelli was able briefly to meet up with his wife and family. In the end, continuous police checks and searches drove him to move to La Spezia. Surveillance was not so relentless as to prevent him from keeping in touch with friends and numerous political allies. These comrades included Gino Lucetti, Gino Bibbi, Stefano Vatteroni and Pasquale Binazzi. Mazzucchelli's time as a semi-outlaw living in the mountains, and the extent of the antifascist network he was able to sustain through the Mussolini years, constituted excellent preparation for his subsequent role as a partisan leader after 1943.

=== Another war ===
During the later 1930s, official memories of Mazzucchelli's anti-fascist activism seem to have receded, and shortly before the outbreak of war in (from an Italian perspective) June 1940 he was able, after much difficulty and delay, to purchase the concession on a small marble quarry from the Carrara city authorities. As a quarry owner, Ugo Mazzucchelli's principal activities until 1943 involved excavating, processing and trading blocks of marble. The second half of 1942 was a time of military setbacks for Italy and its allies, both on account of the appearance of large numbers of Anglo-American forces in North Africa and because of the destruction of German armies at Stalingrad. In the Balkans and in Italy's African colonies, the news was less dramatic, but there was an absence of glorious military victories by Italian armies and their German allies: "collaboration on the ground" between the two armies was often far from smooth. The war was becoming unpopular with mainstream opinion, and during 1943, discussions began among anti-fascist about possible ways forward. Mazzucchelli retained links with comrades, but initially remained on the sidelines of the discussions, which may explain why at this stage he was still left alone by the security services. Later, during the summer of that year. a meeting was held at Mazzucchelli's home in the city's San Ceccardo quarter at which a "Citizens' Committee" ("Comitato civico") was established. That was followed by a succession of further initiatives over the next few weeks which, taken together, amounted to the formation of a local branch of what was launched in September 1943 as the "National Liberation Committee" ("Comitato di Liberazione Nazionale" / CLN). Additionally, Mazzucchelli was now welcoming various military deserters and others sought by the authorities to the "Lorano 2" quarry, over which he seems by this stage to have had some level of control. The place was hard to find and harder to reach, except by foot, which made it a suitable place for hiding men and for storing the weapons which comrades were by this time beginning to gather.

=== Anti-fascist resistance ===
==== In the city ====
News came through of Italy's military capitulation early in September 1943. During September and October 1943, across Italy, small anti-fascist armed groups were forming: these would form the nuclei of the first partisan units. Carrara anarchists, driven in part by the constant encouragement and inspiration coming from Romulado Del Papa and Onofrio Lodovici, were among the first to establish these armed groups. Importantly, they were also able to provide practical logistical support for the emerging CLN, which frequently convened in the so-called "Buco" (loosely, "[underground] hole") alongside the via Beccheria, which was virtually on a level with the little Carriona River, flowing in a channel round the centre of Carrara. The meeting location had numerous escape points, including a series of carefully concealed doorways installed by the anarchists.

On 8 September 1943, Mazzucchelli launched a little "flying patrol" ("Pattuglia volante") which developed into the "Mazzucchelli unit". Members at launch were Ugo Mazzucchelli, his sons Alvaro and Carlo, and the colourful Carrara anarchist Romualdo Del Papa. A few days after launch, acting in response to urgent rumours of German army plans to take over the facility from their Italian "allies" following the signing of the armistice on 3 September, the "flying patrol" linked up with other local groups to lead a successful assault on the Dogali barracks. The anti-fascist fighters succeeded in requisitioning the munitions that were stored at the barracks and set about urging the elite Alpini troops accommodated there to desert the government side and join the partisans. It was the first of many such missions. The weapons and those comrades persuaded to abandon their army posts were taken away to the relative safety of what would become known as the partisan mountain hide-out at the "Lorano 2" quarry.

==== In the mountains ====
During the first part of 1944, the little resistance groups based in and around Carrara became more closely networked. The "Mazzucchelli unit" co-ordinated, in particular, with the neighbouring group headed up by Ismaele Macchiarini. German forces were by now increasingly in control of the cities and major towns, and were aware of the accelerating proliferation of armed resistance cells out of town and for the most part out of sight. A succession of "sweeps" were undertaken to try to flush out and capture armed anti-fascists, but the mountainous character of the region and the Germans' lack of local knowledge of the terrain provided an ideal backdrop for guerrilla combat, complicating round-up operations undertaken by German and Italian forces operating in support of the newly installed "Social Republic" puppet administration in Rome. Nevertheless, during April 1944, Ugo Mazzucchelli was captured by men of the "Reichsführer SS" 16th SS Panzergrenadier Division, and taken with several others to the Malaspina prison in Massa. The circumstances and precise data of Mazzucchelli's capture are not known. According to at least one source, the anti-fascists detained in the prison at Massa during April and May 1944 were at constant risk of being shot without notice. Towards the end of May a partisan commando managed to kidnap the son of the director of the prison in which the arrested men were being detained. Mazzucchelli, after spending approximately two months in jail, was one of those released in exchange for the freedom of the partisans' hostage.

At around the time of Mazzucchelli's release, the secret CLN meetings in the riverside "Buco" basement room came to an end, due to the increasing risk of detection in the municipality. Mazzucchelli returned to the unit and took a lead in removing this and other groups with which they were networked out of the city and into the mountains on a more permanent basis. The mountains had also become less safe, however, due to the appearance of a German armoured division under the command of SS-Sturmbannführer Walter Reder, still aged only 28, and infamous after the war on account of his leadership role in various mass killings including, locally, the massacre of more than 500 villagers and refugees at Sant'Anna di Stazzema. (Note: Reder was found guilty of war crimes by a military tribunal convened at Bologna in 1951, and remained in prison till paroled in 1985.) Mazzucchelli now reorganised his unit and renamed it as the "formazione autonoma Lucetti" - more frequently identified more simply as the "Gino Lucetti brigade". The name was adopted to honour the recently deceased anti-fascist hero from Carrara, Gino Lucetti, who in 1926 had attempted to assassinate the leader using a roadside bomb by the Porta Pia in 1926. (Note: Lucetti had been freed from his prison cell on Santo Stefano Island by advancing Anglo-American forces in September 1943, but was killed in a German air attack on the island of Ischia on 17 September 1943.)

The Lucetti brigade now pursued a modest guerrilla war, possibly constrained by the still limited availability of weapons and munitions. Within the brigade, there was much discussion, given the massive imbalance of forces active in the field, on the advisability of carrying out individualised attacks on "Nazi", whether picked off individually or in small groups. There was a powerful need to try to avoid triggering brutal German reprisals. Mazzucchelli seems to have favoured a cautious approach, acutely aware of the number of "hostages" being held by the enemy. These included not only young people suspected of partisan activities, but also civilians with no obvious involvement in resistance activism. Mazzucchelli, whose strategic approach was generally followed, preferred a two-pronged approach which at once prioritized training and consolidation. while also providing support for the destitute, which included the families in the Carrara region of those who were being held by the government and their German backers. Funds were urgently needed both for the partisans' welfare priorities and in order to sustain and arm the activist groups in the mountains: Mazzucchelli became known among comrades for the extent of his focus on funding.

Some sources, in describing Mazzucchelli approach to fund raising, highlight the extensive use made of kidnapping members of Carrara's wealthiest families, who were made to pay out appropriately vast sums of money in order to pay for the needs of the local resistance. Others refer simply to the series of "negotiations" conducted by Mazzucchelli in the marble-walled offices of bank directors and other heads of industrial and commercial businesses. Small groups, made up of members of the city's haute-bourgeoisie, were escorted into the mountains, to areas controlled by the partisans, where they found themselves invited to subscribe money for the resistance effort. Reassuringly, some of the money was donated directly to local hospitals - where wounded local partisans were among the patients. But much of the money was used to fund local partisan activities, and some was used for supplies to be sent north beyond the Apennines, to Parma, where German military control was less precarious, and the military needs of partisan fighters were becoming more urgent than in Tuscany. Affluent Carrara citizens who displayed reluctance over donating large amounts of money to the resistance partisans were enabled to stay behind and share the mountain living conditions of the brigadists. Although much of what is known the Italian and wartime partisan movements remains undocumented or dependent on anecdotal reports, reflecting the necessary secrecy surrounding their actions, there was nothing secretive about Mazzucchelli's insistence on proper book-keeping when it came to the monies received from members of Carrara's haute-bourgeoisie. A written receipt was issued for each "donation" received, and a complete report of the amounts was submitted to the "National Liberation Committee" ("Comitato di Liberazione Nazionale" / CLN), the national oversight apparatus for the various Italian resistance movements which, following the liberation of Rome in June 1944, became the closest thing to a government that those parts of Italy already liberated from fascism had. From those accounting records it is known that in a fund raising campaign that ran between September 1944 and November 1944, Ugo Mazzucchelli and his Carrara region partisan comrades collected a remarkable 5 Million lire (or slightly more: sources differ) from the wealthy citizens of Carrara and the surrounding region. (Note: Five million Italian lire would have been worth approximately USD 263,000 in 1944, roughly equivalent to USD 3,870,000 in 2021. Major differences in spending patterns mean that such international and historical extrapolations can never be seen as anything more than distractingly rough approximations, however.)

==== Liberation of Carrara ====
During the summer of 1944, Mazzucchelli's Lucetti Battalion worked closely with other partisan units, notably the "Ugo Muccini" and "Gino Menconi" brigades. It is not clear whether anything so formal as a merger between the groupings ever occurred, but by November 1944, substantially strengthened by Mazzucchelli's training and fund raising, they were co-ordinating together as a single Carrara region "Garibaldi brigade". For many admirers, a highpoint in the story of Carrara's partisan brigades was the liberation of Carrara by partisan forces, following fierce fighting. This took place between 8 and 13 November 1944. Many were killed: large numbers of Germans were captured. For three or four days the operation could be seen as a major success. An urgent invitation to the "Allied Armies" that they should come and consolidate the partisans' remarkable military achievement was ignored. With the Germans expelled from Rome, the Americans and British were quietly diverting troops to France and saw no immediate need to push further north through the formidable German "Gothic Line" defences, at a season when the mountain terrain of Tuscany and Umbria would put them at a disadvantage when facing German, forces most of which were better accustomed to fighting though rain, snow and mountain terrain. Meanwhile, in Carrara, where the city streets provided opportunities for the partisans to achieve quick victories using guerrilla tactics, the Nazi-Fascist armies launched a counteroffensive. After four days, Carrara's partisan liberators were forced to retreat back up the mountains.

==== Lucca ====
A further set-back for the partisan units recorded at the start of December 1944 was a recommendation received a few days earlier from General Alexander, the newly appointed leader of the "Allied Armies", in which he recommended that the "partisan gangs" should be disbanded in recognition that winter was approaching. The allies' own offensive was deferred until the following spring, and while the Gothic line appeared to have become "stabilized" for several months. The partisan fighters were facing encirclement in the mountains and the prospect of a savage Nazi-Fascist round-up. They were also running short of supplies. Most of the partisan groups in the area are now disbanded. Mazzucchelli's Lucetti Battalion managed to break out, and during the second half of December 1944 Mazzucchelli himself managed, despite a succession of difficulties, to make his way through a gap in the German defensive Gothic line and take refuge in the countryside outside Lucca, joining the rest of his family and the children. Regional loyalties, always a powerful factor in Italy (as in Spain), had been intensified by the psychological pressures imposed by Fascism and war. Rivalry between Lucca and Carrara was a natural condition of life in the region, and as a high-profile Carrara activist, there is no reason to think Mazzucchelli was joking in later years when, on a number of occasions, he recalled that while living in Lucca during the early months of 1945 he had a distinct sensation of living his life in the gunsights of the so-called comrades from the shadowy local communist units.

==== The final days of the war in Tuscany ====
In March 1945, he returned to the Carrara area and, gathering a group of around twenty men, returned to the Apuan Alps above the city. They established a new fighting brigade, this time named after the Sardinian-American anarchist Michele Schirru who had been arrested in 1931 on strong suspicion of plotting to assassinate the leader, and executed in May following a brief trial rapidly organised and conducted earlier that month before the Special Tribunal for the Defence of the State. During March 1945 the Anglo-American armies finalised preparations for what proved to be the final assault on the German "Gothic line" defences. The 15th Army Group launched their attack on 6 April 1945. Massa was liberated on 10 April 1945. The next day it was the turn of Carrara. The invading armies arrived accompanied by several units of partisans from the mountains behind the city, including Mazzucchelli's. During the days following liberation approximately 710 German soldiers were captured by the partisans and handed over to the allied military authorities.

=== Post-war ===
During the immediate post-war years, Ugo Mazzucchelli participated in the activities of the "Federazione anarchica di Carrara" "Carrara Anarchist Federation". An important initiative in which he took a leading role was the establishment of the local "Partisan Consumer Co-operative" and the "Gino Lucetti Construction Co-operative". The former managed 25 grocery stores in the area, which offered low prices. The co-operatives provided work for several thousand workers - many of them former partisan fighters - and stimulated economic and social recovery in the face of what some sources recall as official inertia on the part of the city authorities. The construction co-operative soon ran into opposition from the locally powerful Montecatini company, however, which had been involved in marble extraction during the Fascist years and was concerned by developments which might suggest any "revolutionary" alternative to a future based on capitalism. It was not just local business leaders who viewed Mazzucchelli and his anarchist comrades with deep suspicion, and in the end the "Gino Lucetti Co-operative" experiment proved short-lived, blocked by a broad coalition of interests and concerns that included even the local Communist Party, which saw the anarchists as a threat to their own power over local government and institutions.

On the more directly political front, it seemed to many among the anarchists that the prominent role they had played in the partisan resistance between 1943 and 1945 should give the movement considerable influence over the future direction of the country. Due to internal disagreements and attitudes elsewhere along the political spectrum that would not happen quite in the way that the anarchist-libertarian movement's leaders might have hoped. An important initiative which took place during the week 15–19 September 1945 in Carrara was Italy's first post-war Anarchist Congress, which set a future direction for the movement nationally. The congress represented a coming together of comrades who had survived fascist repression, those who had fought fascism as partisans, brigadist veterans of the Spanish Civil War and youthful enthusiasms so young that they barely remembered any of those defining experiences. Together, they represented a powerful force to change society from outside any political mainstream. The Carrara anarchists, through their ingrained militancy and deep political roots in local communities, and through their decades of experience in respect of radical syndicalism-unionism, could play a central role in shaping the future.

=== Need for a plan? ===
Ugo Mazzucchelli was the leader of the Carrara anarchists in 1945, and would remain so for a long time, albeit not without a number of bitter conflicts with other senior comrades which led to some lacerating divisions inside the local libertarian movement. The need for "virtuous industriousness" and the urgent need for major reconstruction of everything from residential and industrial buildings, to social and political structures, after two decades of dictatorship and two years of bloody civil war, rendered more destructive by the intensive involvement of foreign armies, signalled a powerful need for leadership even in the anarchist movement, with its tradition of internal dissent. Mazzucchelli was able to formulate a strategy for a future based on "concrete, rational and reason-based anarchism" to be implemented progressively, which might transform workers' living and labour conditions. It is hard to ignore the extent to which, as he elaborated them, Ugo Mazzucchelli's plans revolved around Ugo Mazzucchelli. Carrara should become the national capital of Italian anarchism - which, from some perspectives, it already, informally, was - which would involve transferring all the movement's "most prepared comrades" to the "marble metropolis": the objective was to combine the determination and sensibilities already present in a substantial proportion of the city's population with modern libertarian thinking. In many respects, Mazzucchelli was very far from being a lone voice in highlighting the movement's need for a more focused strategy. The agreement to hold the anarchists' first national postwar congress in Carrara was an important early step in establishing the city's credentials as the centre of Italian anarchism. He took care to maximise the involvement in the congress of nationally well-known comrades, including Ugo Fedeli, Alfonso Failla, Umberto Marzocchi and Pier Carlo Masini. One influential comrade who backed Mazzucchelli's strategy was Alberto Meschi, originally from the north, but a man whose close links to Carrara nevertheless went back more than twenty years. There were other supporters. Most of the nationally well-known comrades remained at best equivocal, however. Someone who did not see merit in Mazzucchelli's plan was Romualdo Del Papa, who, in the judgement of some sources, had emerged in 1945 as co-leader of the Carrara anarchists, jointly with Mazzucchelli. Mazzucchelli would soon become exasperated with Del Papa's "pragmatic" approach to post-war Carrara politics. Del Papa was happy to accept as a political ally almost anyone who had identified with the antifascist resistance during the Mussolini years, and when forced to choose would even repudiate Communist Party allies in order to back Randolfo Pacciardi of the centre-left RPI. Differences in approach between Mazzucchelli and Romualdo Del Papa soon degenerated into an intense and lasting feud, fuelled both by political differences and by what one source terms the "strong personalities" of the two men.

=== Anarchist revival in the province ===
At the 1945 congress Mazzucchelli strongly supported the need for anarchism to become actively involved in the labour movement and to establish an anarchists' "Trades Union Committee" to co-ordinate the various groups involved. The congress was also a valuable opportunity both to meet up with comrades from the old days and to get to know new militants. Nor was this a mere networking exercise. He formed deep and lasting friendships with Ugo Fedeli, Alfonso Failla, Umberto Marzocchi, a veteran both of the Spanish Civil War and of the Résistance in France. For Mazzucchelli, it was a time for the movement to demonstrate a clear focus supported by a strong propaganda apparatus. With that in mind, he promoted many publications including the periodical "Il Cavatore" (1945–1956) and "Il’94" (1945–19149), for a number of editions of which he personally took responsibility as editor-in-chief. The later 1940s and early 1950s were a period of optimism and recovery for the Carrara anarchist movement. Dozens of new local groups were formed, and Ugo Mazzucchelli was a major driver of the new awakening. He was also an active participant in the anarchist movement nationally, attending all the major congresses and conferences, always as a representative of the Carrara federation. Alberto Meschi had returned to Italy in 1943 after escaping from a concentration camp in France. Following the liberation of Carrara, Mazzucchelli and Meschi both returned to the "Chamber of Labour", giving rise, briefly, to hopes that control of it might be recovered for the Carrara anarchist, but these were shattered by a fierce closing of ranks among Communist members and others hostile to anarchism.

As "normality" slowly returned to Italy accompanied, during the 1950s and 1960s by growing prosperity, it became apparent that old-fashioned trades union liaison was not among Mazzucchelli's central interests, and during this period he acquired more concessions for marble extraction which meant that - at least in theory - he might find himself on the opposite side of the table in discussions with local union leaders. The high ambitions for anarchism that comrades had entertained directly after the war had not been realised, and in Tuscany the movement had in many ways become marginalised. Mazzucchelli was himself diversifying his range of interests. One focus was on the welfare of the many exiled Spanish anti-Francoists living in the Carrara area. He took a particular interest in anarchist cultural initiatives, giving practical backing to the development of summer camps for children in need in Marina di Carrara. He increasingly displayed a preference for initiatives that would show the Carrara anarchists in a positive light for future generations of historians: this was reflected in contributions to magazines which displayed an awareness of the sense in which he had himself had been witness to a succession of important chapters in Italian history, as well as in his backing for the setting up of monuments and proper tombstones for the many dead heroes of anti-fascism and the partisan struggles.

=== FIAP ===
In 1963 Mazzucchelli founded a Carrara section of the "Italian Federation of Partisan Associations" ("Federazione italiana delle associazioni partigiane" / FIAP), of which he was already a member of the national ruling committee. The FIAP had been founded back in 1949 by Ferruccio Parri in order to try to bring together all the non-communist Italian partisan groups and members. In 1973 Mazzucchelli was still also a member of the national ruling committee of the "Italian Anarchist Federation" ("Federazione Anarchica Italiana" / FAI), and as far as Carrara were concerned the acronyms FIAP and FIA became almost interchangeable, both because of their similarity, and through the extent to which they both revolved around the still powerful reputation - based on his command of the wartime Lucetti and Schirru partisan battalions - and personality of Ugo Mazzucchelli.

=== The old campaigner ===
During the 1970s, Mazzucchelli joined with his friend Umberto Marzocchi and teamed up with the writer and longstanding pacifist Carlo Cassola and the "Lega per il Disarmo", which Cassola founded in 1977. Together they sought to reinvigorate anti-militarist commitment in Italy.

During the early 1980s, despite being well past the conventional retirement age, Ugo Mazzucchelli continued to exercise his formidable organisational and campaigning skills. Much of his energy was now devoted to the uses of marble, which in other cities might have been a niche concern, but in Carrara was at the core of the city's being. It was also the material on which Mazzucchelli himself principally depended for his livelihood. Nevertheless, it is apparent that during the last fifteen or so years of his life, Mazzucchelli's still considerable energies and leadership talents were no longer focussed principally on the mainstream concerns of the anarchist movement. He continued to campaign for appropriate memorials and headstones on tombs for men such as his old comrade Gino Lucetti, who had tried to assassinate Mussolini, and Giuseppe Spinelli whom circumstances had driven into Argentinian exile in 1945. Producing appropriately inscribed marble slabs was easy enough, but Mazzucchelli's heroes were not necessarily the heroes of the city's increasingly middle-class political establishment, and there was a myriad of bureaucratic and "technical" obstacles to be overcome. Mazzucchelli created a "Comitato giustizia per Franco Serantini" and led the campaign for a public memorial to celebrate Franco Serantini, a young anarchist who, following a rowdy anti-fascist demonstration, was killed - very many believed - by policemen in May 1972. (Note: The circumstances of Serantini's death remain unclear. The belief became widespread both within and far beyond the anarchist movement that he fell into a coma from which he never recovered. After being shot multiple times and/or savagely beaten by police.) A large stone memorial was eventually erected in Pisa's Piazza San Silvestro in 1982, but only on the basis of a sustained popular campaign by workers, students and the "angry housewives of proletarian Pisa", and after much angry debate.

Ugo Mazzucchelli was an octogenarian when he launched "the last great battle of his life". Gaetano Bresci was a Tuscan-born Italian-American anarchist from New Jersey who returned to Italy and assassinated the king in July 1901. It was not the first anarchist assassination attempt against Umberto I, but it was the first that succeeded. For many commentators, a particularly noteworthy aspect of the affair was that Bresci became identified as the first European convicted regicide offender not to be executed: capital punishment had been abolished in 1889. In June 1985, Mazzucchelli convened a meeting in Carrara of activists, interested citizens and well-regarded university professors, including the nationally known historians Enzo Santarelli (whose own political proclivities could in no way be construed as radical) and Pier Carlo Masini. They put together a cogent case for Bresci's historical importance, and therefore for erecting the proposed memorial to him by the entrance to the city's main cemetery. It was the first of many committee meetings over the next five years. Mazzucchelli's conspicuously long campaign for the placement of a memorial to Bresci was remarkable in the extent to which it succeeded in uniting the forces of the political right and the political centre - described by one commentator as an alliance between reactionary and respectable Italy - in opposition. Coming four decades after Italy had become a republic by means of an "institutional referendum", Mazzucchelli's campaign for a Bresci memorial nevertheless awakened a valuable debate on violence and terrorism at a delicate time in the country's history: the debate was enriched and broadened by extensive coverage in the print and broadcast media. During 1986 "Prime Minister" Cossiga himself intervened in the debate. At one stage a court case was even launched against Carrara's Communist mayor, the city councillors and members of the committee that, by authorizing the memorial, had "condoned the crime of attacking the head of state". However, the twenty-nine accused were all acquitted at the court of first instance and then acquitted again when the matter was appealed. Ugo Mazzucchelli faced trial in connection with his memorial campaign, but was acquitted in December 1993. Towards the end of a quiet evening early in May 1990, shortly after sunset, the memorial to Gaetano Bresci was finally set in its place by an entrance to the Turigliano Cemetery, a tribute both to the man who killed the king in 1901 and to the determination and campaigning flair of Ugo Mazzucchelli through the 1980s.

=== Tensions within the FIA ===
At the end of the 1980s, Ugo Mazzucchelli emerged as a voice from within of those keen to renew the national FAI. He was among those who believed that in order to gain wider support, Italian anarchism would need to move towards a position of greater political moderation. Inevitably, he received heavy criticism from the more "orthodox" hardliners in the leadership. Political strategies identified by Mazzucchelli as "more modern and more grown-up" could also be interpreted as an acceptance of democratic principles and a willingness to collaborate with discredited public institutions. Mazzucchelli, during his final decade, was moving away from the anarchist mainstream. Mutual alienation was intensified when he unambiguously supported the US conduct of the 1991 Gulf War. After 1995 he caused further consternation among anarchist comrades by suggesting they should vote in support of the newly launched centre-left the "Olive Tree" coalition in elections. Nor had he ever seen the need to learn the art of the gentle answer. An affectionate and broadly supportive obituary by his friend Paolo Finzi nevertheless recalls that during his final years, especially when engaged in discussion with comrades in Carrara, he did not hold back from arguing his case "harshly", in a way that in too many cases led to cooling or breakage of sometimes longstanding political and personal friendships". By the time he died, on 6 January 1997, Ugo Mazzucchelli's resignation from the FAI had been accepted.

== Old age and re-evaluation ==
Although a number of sources describe aspects of Mazzucchelli's evident divergence from mainstream anarchism during his final years, most appear to be at a loss to explain it. One commentator who rises to the challenge is Franco Bertolucci. He describes Mazzucchelli's gradual evolution away from the vision of anarchism that he held as a young man and during his middle years. Progressively, having himself become the owner of a quarrying concession, Mazzucchelli came to see anarchism as a blend of social doctrine and political action which should, without further procrastination, create the necessary conditions for a radical transformation of society based on equality and liberty. That gave the recipe for a society founded on "libertarian democracy" and an uncompromising abandonment of the revolutionary goal, at least if revolution were to be interpreted as a violent breaking apart of social and economic relationships. From this broadly coherent if somewhat homespun personal philosophy of anarchism, Mazzucchelli in his old age extrapolated the need for a clear separation from (and stigmatization of) that section of the movement that rejected his own evolving vision.

== See also ==
- Anti-Fascism In Italy
