= Friedrich Engel =

Friedrich Engel may refer to:

- Friedrich Engel (mathematician) (1861–1941), German mathematician
- Friedrich Engel (SS officer) (1909–2006), German SS officer

== See also ==
- Friedrich Engels (1820–1895), philosopher
- Friedrich Engelhorn (1821–1902), industrialist
