= Pietro Bruzzi =

Italian anarchist partisan (1888–1945)

- Born: 20 March 1888; Maleo, Lombardy, Kingdom of Italy
- Died: 19 February 1945 (aged 56); San Vittore Olona, Lombardy, Italian Social Republic
- Cause of death: Execution by shooting
- Resting place: Cimitero Maggiore di Milano; 45°30′10.46″N 9°7′7.7″E
- Occupation: Mechanic
- Movement: Anarcho-syndicalism, individualist anarchism, anti-fascism
- Opponents: Fascist Italy (1922–1943); Italian Social Republic (1943–1945)
- Military career
- Allegiance: Italian resistance movement
- Service: Partisan brigades
- Service years: 1943–1945
- Unit: Malatesta Brigade
- Conflicts: Italian Civil War

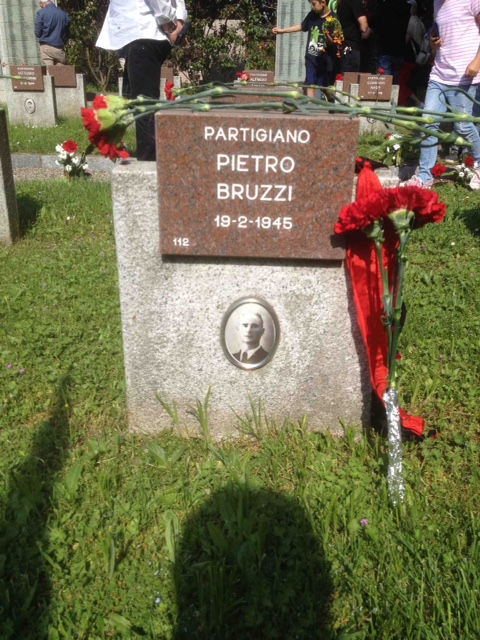
Gravestone of Bruzzi

Pietro Bruzzi (20 March 1888 – 19 February 1945) was an Italian mechanic, anarchist activist and partisan.

== Biography ==
Bruzzi was born on 20 March 1888, in the Lombard town of Maleo, where he was educated at a vocational school. After graduating, he moved to Milan, where he became involved with local socialist groups, before joining the Italian anarchist movement. In October 1909, he was made editor-in-chief of the newspaper La Protesta umana, but his radical articles soon made him a target for arrest, forcing him to flee into exile in France the following year. Stopping in Marseille, he briefly contributed to the newspaper La Rivolta, before heading on to Paris, where he arrived in July 1910 and joined up with the anarcho-syndicalists. In January 1911, he stayed in the United States, but had returned to Europe by April 1912.

Following the Italian entry into World War I, in 1916, he was arrested and repatriated to Italy, where he was conscripted into the Royal Italian Army. He quickly deserted and fled to neutral Switzerland, where he met up with a number of Milanese individualist anarchists that had taken refuge in Zürich. Bruzzi was soon arrested by the Swiss police, under suspicion of involvement in a bombing, who expelled him from the country. Back in Milan, he was sentenced to death for desertion, but he was granted amnesty after the war ended.

In post-war Milan, he joined the individualist movement as editor of the newspapers Individualista and Iconoclasta. In March 1921, he became a prime suspect of organising the Diana massacre. Together with Ugo Fedeli, he fled over the Swiss border in disguise as railway workers. He then went on to Berlin, where, with the support of the local anarchist communists and Rudolf Rocker, he was able to travel to Moscow, in Soviet Russia. He soon returned to Germany, and stayed briefly in Austria and Belgium, before returning to France. In April 1922, he settled in Courbevoie, where he worked as a mechanic for the rest of the 1920s. During this period, the Italian authorities weren't able to trace his movements.

Together with Ugo Fedeli and Mario Mantovani, he contributed articles to the magazine Eresia, and after the proclamation of the Second Spanish Republic in 1931, he moved to Barcelona, where he joined the libertarian correspondence office and collaborated on the magazine Il Risveglio anarchico. In June 1931, he attended an anti-fascist rally that protested the execution of Michele Schirru by the authorities of Fascist Italy. He worked as the secretary of the French anarcho-syndicalist Pierre Besnard and travelled around Spain, giving lectures and participating in anti-fascist activism, under the pseudonym "Pietro Bucci". He was expelled from the country in March 1933, but returned to Barcelona clandestinely. On 28 January 1935, he was extradited to Fascist Italy, which caused mass protests from the anarchist movement.

Following his repatriation, he was acquitted of the charges of conspiracy that had been on the books since the 1920s. Nevertheless, he was deported to the penal colony on Ponza, where he was imprisoned for five years. On 8 July 1940, he was released and decided to return to work in Milan. After the fall of the Fascist regime in Italy, in 1943, he linked up with his old anarchist comrades and joined the Italian resistance movement, establishing the Malatesta Brigade. He also covertly attempted to publish the newspaper L'Adunata dei libertari, but only a single issue was printed, on 18 July 1944. He was captured in Melegnano by the Nazis, who imprisoned him at San Vittore Olona. On 19 February 1945, he was shot by the Nazi Schutzstaffel (SS), in reprisal for the fascist losses in the Italian campaign. His comrades subsequently renamed their unit, in his honour, to the Bruzzi-Malatesta Brigade.

== Bibliography ==
- Coppari, Adriana, ed. (13 January 2023). "Pietro Bruzzi". ANPI (in Italian).
- Granata, Mattia (2004). "BRUZZI, Pietro". Dizionario biografico online degli anarchici italiani (in Italian). Biblioteca Franco Serantini. ISBN 9788886389860. OCLC 54662152.
