= Raimondo Ricci =

Italian politician and partisan

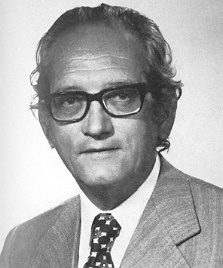
- Ricci in 1976.

President of ANPI
- In office 17 June 2009 – 16 April 2011
- Preceded by: Agostino "Tino" Casali
- Succeeded by: Carlo Smuraglia

Member of the Senate
- In office 12 July 1983 – 1 July 1987
- Constituency: Liguria

Member of the Chamber of Deputies
- In office 5 July 1976 – 11 July 1983
- Constituency: Genoa

Personal details
- Born: 13 April 1921 Rome, Italy
- Died: 26 November 2013 (aged 92) Genoa, Italy
- Party: Italian Communist Party
- Education: University of Genoa
- Occupation: Politician, lawyer

Raimondo Ricci (13 April 1921 – 26 November 2013) was an Italian politician and partisan, President of National Association of Italian Partisans from 2009 to 2011.

== Biography ==
In 1943, after the Armistice of Cassibile, Ricci decided to join the partisans, but after a few months he was arrested by the National Republican Guard, given to the Gestapo and imprisoned in the Mauthausen-Gusen concentration camp. He was freed on 5 May 1945.

Once he returned to Italy, Ricci graduated in Law and became a lawyer. He later became a city councilor in Genoa, elected with the Italian Communist Party and from 1969 he has been provincial President of ANPI in Genoa.

From 1976 to 1983, for two consecutive legislatures, Ricci has been a member of the Chamber of Deputies, elected with the PCI.

In June 2002, Ricci went to Hamburg to testify in the trial against Friedrich Engel, responsible for the Nazi massacres in Liguria when he was commander of the German police in Genoa.

After having been President of ANPI from 2009 to 2011, Ricci died in Genoa on 26 November 2013, at the age of 92.

== Electoral history ==
Election	House	Constituency	Party	Votes	Result
1976	Chamber of Deputies	Genoa–Imperia–La Spezia–Savona	PCI	21,242	Elected
1979	Chamber of Deputies	Genoa–Imperia–La Spezia–Savona	PCI	15,344	Elected
1983	Senate of the Republic	Liguria–Genoa II	PCI	49,931	Elected
