= Gino Bibbi =

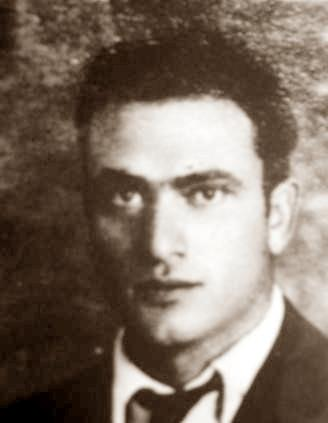
- Born: 5 February 1899; Avenza (Carrara), Tuscany, Italy
- Died: 8 August 1999 (aged 100); Carrara, Tuscany, Italy
- Education: "Istituto tecnico" Pisa "Politecnico di Milano"
- Occupations: Engineer; Anarcho-antifascist activist Spanish Civil war pilot
- Spouse: María de los Dolores Ausias "Lolita" Marata
- Children: 2
- Parents: Carlo Bibbi (father); Gioconda Paglini (mother)

Gino Bibbi (5 February 1899 - 8 August 1999) was an Italian engineer, political activist, anarchist, militant antifascist who participated in the Spanish Revolution of 1936 as a republican fighter pilot. Earlier, he had placed his engineering skills at the service of the causes for which he fought. He supplied the SIPE grenade-bomb which his cousin Gino Lucetti threw at Mussolini's car in Rome on 11 September 1926. The bomb exploded only after bouncing off the roof of the car containing its intended target: Mussolini was undamaged. Bibbi was arrested, but later escaped and fled abroad.

== Biography ==
=== Provenance and early years ===
Gino Bibbi was born at Avenza, a small town between the coast and Carrara, into which it has subsequently been subsumed. Carlo Bibbi, his father, is described variously as a timber merchant and an owner of lands and quarries (presumably of marble). In political terms, Carlo Bibbi would have been considered a liberal and a moderate. Gino Bibbi was born with at least one sibling, Marietta "Zingrina" Bibbi (1895–1993), who was four years older than he was. She trained as an elementary school teacher, but is not believed ever to have taught. The two would remain closely allied, after they grew up, in personal and political terms. Relatively little is recorded of his childhood, but he grew up in a city that was already well known for leftist militancy, and from something he later wrote it appears that the schoolboy Gino Bibbi already suffered from a guilt-driven social conscience: "I came close to crying when I saw my school friends did not even have shoes. I, being rich, was shamed by their poverty". (Note: "Mi veniva dapiangere - raccontava - a vederea scuola i miei compagniche non avevano neppure lescarpe. Mi vergognavo io, cheero ricco, per la loro povertà".)

=== Student, army conscript and antifascist activist ===
Bibbi studied at the "Istituto tecnico" (college) in Pisa, but his study was interrupted when he was conscripted for military service in February 1917. He attended a "junior officer" course at Parma, emerging with the rank of an infantry second lieutenant ("sottotenente"). From there he was sent to join the frontline fighting at Lagarina, near the Austrian frontier. He was sent back after a few months, badly sick with abdominal typhus. In October 1922 he was placed on what appears to have been some form of indefinite leave from the army and returned to his home at Carrara, He re-enrolled for a degree course in engineering at the Pisa "Istituto tecnico" (college), a relatively short distance along the coast to the south. However, at the end of 1922 he moved on to the "Politecnico di Milano", beyond the mountains to the north. There are indications that by this time he may already have "gravitated towards the anarchist movement". From other sources it would appear that when he first enrolled at Milan he would still have considered himself an "interventionist democrat" with republican leanings. In any case, it was while he was at Milan that his ideals and political choices matured and crystallised. It was probably during this period that he came to know the influential anarchist theorist, Camillo Berneri, with whom he would remain in touch until the latter's assassination in 1937. He also became friendly with the Molinari family, especially with two of Ettore's sons, Libero and Henry, an idealistically driven family of anarchist-scientists whose class background was not dissimilar from Bibbi's own.

Meanwhile, in October 1922, in Rome, the Mussolini government took power. Viewed through the retrospective prism supplied by Adolf Hitler in 1933 it becomes easy to see the slide towards one-party dictatorship in Italy as a relatively gradual transformation. Nevertheless, the systematic use of violence as a tool of political influence had already been on display for a number of years across Italy, and especially in Milan and the north more generally. Unlike many people at this stage, libertarian anarchists such as Bibbi and his circle were disinclined to give the fascists the benefit of the doubt. It seems to have been during 1923 that he spotted Renato Ricci in the centre of Carrara and thrust a handful of "subversive" (Note: An aspect of the political leaflets distributed by anarchists that was considered particularly subversive, in the eyes of Fascist loyalists, was the references they contained to "[il] tragico pagliaccio di Predappio" ("The tragic Clown of Predappio"). Benito Mussolini, a man not noted for self-mockery, was born at Predappio in 1883. The soubriquet endured.) political leaflets in the face of the man who was one of Carrara's leading (and as matters later turned out most politically astute) young fascist paramilitaries. Bibbi fled on his motorbike but was chased, pulled off his bike, and very badly beaten. His father's timber mill was later torched.

His commitment to antifascism undiminished by the assault, Bibbi continued as an active member of the anarchist circles in his home city and at Milan where, at this stage, he was still a student. Through his involvement with the USI (trades union) he came to know Alibrando Giovannetti: the two men worked together on distributing "Rassegna Sindacale" and other items of trades union propaganda. In 1924 Bibbi's name appears on a list of subscribers to Errico Malatesta's newly launched (and short-lived) anarchist review magazine "Pensiero e Volontà". Despite the brutal thuggery to which he had been subjected at Carrara after his encounter with Ricci in 1923, he continued to advertise his anarchist convictions, and the assault in 1923 turned out to be the first of several such incidents. Memorably, on 18 May 1924 he turned up in the centre of Carrara on horseback and then, switching to a motorbike, distributed antifascist leaflets all round the city in broad daylight. He was immediately arrested, but then released under an ad hoc amnesty (“assolto per amnistia”). A few years later, a file note dated 1928 in the prefecture at the adjacent municipality of Massa described Bibbi as a boy "of seemingly mild character, of good education, of average intelligence and good upbringing .... He professes to believe in anarcho-communist principles, and is viewed as a solitary somewhat dangerous idealist." (Note: un ragazzo "di carattere apparentemente mite, di buona educazione, di mediocre intelligenza ed ha discreta cultura ...... Professa principi comunisti anarchici, ed è considerato un idealista solitario alquanto pericoloso.")

In the Autumn/Fall of 1925 Bibbi was again badly beaten up by fascist thugs, probably by way of retribution following a gun fight between some fascists and his cousin Gino Lucetti which had taken place some time earlier. During this period Bibbi continued to sustain his contacts with Camillo Berneri and a number of other militant libertarians.

=== The assassination attempt ===
On 11 September 1926 Gino Lucetti attempted to assassinate Benito Mussolini in Rome by throwing a bomb at the car on which the dictator was travelling as it passed the Porta Pia. The car was moving slowly and the bomb hit its roof and/or windscreen of the car before bouncing off it and exploding on the adjacent pavement. No harm befell Mussolini as a result of the attack. The next day a number of the attacker's family members were arrested, including his cousin Gino Bibbi and his sister Maria. Details of Bibbi's own involvement were made public only in 1984, with the posthumous publication of detailed memories provided to two interviewers by one of Lucetti's small band of co-conspirators, Umberto Tommasini (1896–1980). Despite there being no separate source corroborating Tommasini's recollections, his reports of the affair were consistent with what was already known, and are generally accepted by later commentators. The bomb used was an SIPE grenade-bomb manufactured in Milan by the "Società Italiana Prodotti Esplodenti" an explosives products company located near the "Politecnico di Milano" where Bibbi was still registered as a student. (He seems never to have completed his degree course.) It was Bibbi who provided the closely knot of conspirators from Carrara with the bomb and with other unspecified weapons which might prove of use in the attack or its aftermath. The police made repeated attempts to implicate Bibbi in the plot, but were un able to find the necessary evidence. Whatever the conspirators knew, they remained silent, and most were eventually released without charge, including Adele Crudeli, the 67-year-old mother of Lucetti.

=== Detention ===
Meanwhile, in the absence of any trial, on 19 November 1926, the Provincial Commissioner condemned Bibbi to five years of "police confinement". On 30 July 1927 he reached the island of Ustica as one of a party of some thirty anarchists whom the authorities had determined "stood out on account of their restless [i.e. provocative and/or suspect] conduct". (Note: "...fanno notare per la loro condotta irrequieta".) Among those confined on the island were several who, according to information supplied in the 1980s by Tommasini, had indeed been part of the assassination plot, including not just Tommasini himself, but also Anselmo Preziosi and Spartaco Stagnetti. Although, during the fascist years, there were at times more than a thousand people confined on Ustica by the authorities, it would be incorrect to think of the island as a "conventional" prison in Anglo-American terms. Shortly after he arrived, Gino Bibbi was joined there, on a purely voluntary basis, by his elder sister (and fellow anti-government activist), Maria. While some sources insist she was driven to this by her deep affection for her brother, others indicate that she was motivated by a wish to avoid being arrested in Palermo, where she was living at the time. It was probably on Ustica that Bibbi came to know the family of Calogero Cirino, with members of which he would be closely involved during the early 1930s. Clara, the daughter of the family, shared much of Bibbi's period of confinement: the two would be romantically linked for some years, before separating in 1935.

In the aftermath of the bomb attack on an inaugural ceremony at the "Fiera Milano" (exhibition ground), which took place on 12 April 1928, causing the deaths of 20 people (though not of the king, who was assumed to have been the intended target), Gino Bibbi was one of several hundred "subversives" who fell under suspicion. He was removed from his island exile to the infamous "Regina Coeli" ("Queen of the Heavens") jail in Rome and from there, shortly afterwards, to Milan, together with Libero Molinari. The police believed that Bibbi and Molinari, along with Nella Giacomelli and Libero's brother, Henry, were part of a "terrorist plot" devised by Camillo Berneri. It was one of a number of attempted police framings to which Bibbi would fall victim. As matters turned out, when they faced trial before the "Special Court" on 5 September 1928, Bibbi and Libro Molinari were acquitted on all counts, while the prosecution's investigations into the supposed complicity of Henry Mollinari and Nella Giacomelli were terminated, and the two suspects released, almost immediately, without matters progressing to any sort of court trial. During October 1928 Bibbi was returned to his island confinement, this time on Lipari, another of the islands a short distance to the north of Sicily, and somewhat larger than Ustica, the island on which he had previously been detained.

Confinement on Lipari provided him with the opportunity to get to know Carlo Rosselli, Emilio Lussu and Fausto Nitti, all three of them prominent among those who, after 1943, would be celebrated for their opposition to Mussolini's violence-based one-party dictatorship. In June 1929 Bibbi was the subject of another denunciation and he was taken back to Milan to face another trial. Accursed, along with others, of re-instating "a subversive organisation and propaganda", (Note: “organizzazione e propaganda sovversiva”) most of those accused were charged, apparently for lack of evidence, though three comrades received two-year jail terms, considered relatively lenient in view of the charges they had faced. By September 1929 Bibbi had been returned to Lipari where, between undergoing interrogation sessions and worse "fascist infamies on those accursed islands", he was involved in further networking with fellow anarchists and anti-fascists.

=== Back to college? ===
In January 1930 Gino Bibbi secured authorisation from the appropriate government ministry to enrol at the Engineering School at the University of Palermo, in order to complete his engineering degree. That meant moving to Palermo. According to one source he was accommodated at the city's Ucciardone Jail, while elsewhere it is recorded that he was able to lodge at the family home of Calogero Cirino. Towards the end of April 1930 he made a brief return visit to Avenza where his father was terminally ill. Carlo Bibbi died on 3 May 1930. Bibbi returned south and was returned to "confinement" on 10 May 1930. He resolved to escape at the first opportunity. Opportunity presented itself soon, and on 20 July 1930 he left Palermo. According to police reports of the matter he was helped by the Cirino family and by a Palermo anarchist called Giovanni Comella, identified as an expert on escapes abroad. Bibbi was a passenger on board a steam ship called "The Argentina" which took him to Tunisia. By 26 July 1930 he was in Paris.

The "Bollettino delle ricerche" gazette produced by the Homeland Security division of the Interior Ministry included, in its supplement no.194 on 24 August 1930 a photo-portrait of Bibbi accompanied by a biographical note under the headline "scomparso da arrestare" - in effect, a government "wanted" notice. Meanwhile, on 31 July 1930, Bernardo Cremonini, otherwise identified as trusted operative No. 6 of the "OVRA" ("Italian security services"), submitted the first of many lengthy reports to the ministry on which he confirmed that he had taken the necessary steps to collect intelligence on Bibbi's arrival in Paris. Cremonini was among the most skilful members of the government security service, and infiltrating informants into groups of exiled anti-government activists was central to his role. His reports were no doubt of great interest to Italian government agencies, just as they have subsequently become for historians. For Bibbi his arrival in Paris marked the start of a period of intense activity and keeping constantly on the move between France, Switzerland and, perhaps most critically, Spain.

=== Active exile ===
In France he sustained friendly links with various enemies of the Mussolini government who had by this time been driven abroad, including Carlo Rosselli, Randolfo Pacciardi, Giobbe Giopp and his old friend Camillo Berneri. According to police records, in Paris Bibbi became a member of the "Unione Comunista-Anarchica dei profughi italiani" (loosely, "Anarchist Communist Union of Italian Refugees"), the Italian "Anarchico Autonomo" group in Paris and the "Anarchist Committee for Political Victims". All through this time, Cremonini was able to keep him under close surveillance, even providing the ministry with reports on the target's "state of mind", which he assessed as "dangerous", because Bibbi was constantly looking for projects that might be capable of scoring a "deep hit" against fascism. A confidential memorandum dated 14 February 1931 was issued by the Interior Ministry to prefects across the Kingdom of Italy: it listed the nation's most dangerous anarchist terrorists, with instructions that they should be arrested. There were 37 names listed. One of those was" Gino Bibbi". At the same time Arturo Bocchini, the government's long-standing Chief of Police, unleashed a number of additional homeland security officers for intensified surveillance duties in respect of the anarchists in Avenza (Carrara). This was based on Bocchini's conviction that Bibbi was co-ordinating with other known individuals on the intellectual-political end of the anarchist spectrum, including Alberto Tarchiani, Alberto Cianca, Emilio Lussu, Randolfo Pacciardi and Carlo Rosselli, to prepare another attack on the leader. Several of these, like Bibbi, were already living in relative safety outside Italy. Two middle-ranking activists were nevertheless located and arrested during January/February 1931, and forced to disclose information on the "plans of the Paris group". Bibbi was one of those denounced, along with a large number of alleged participants, condemned variously as militants, anarchists and republicans, in the anti-fascist "Giustizia e Libertà" group. The accusations, in summary, were that those named were engaging in "anti-fascist activity" and "attempted massacre" ("“tentata strage"). However, on 25 July the "Special Court" established by the government back in 1926 to deal with "political crimes" struck out these and other cases, presumably on evidential grounds.

The Italian security services also became convinced that Bibbi, in partnership with Emidio Recchioni, who by this time was living in London was masterminding a project to launch an air raid on Italy and bombard the country not with anything involving real bombs, but with "antifascist manifestos", inciting rebellion against the government or even a further attack against the leader. Remarkably, there was a germ of reality in this largely fantastical vision. During the summer of 1931 Gino Bibbi quietly made his way from France to Spain, together with Assunto Zamboni, who had also managed to leave Italy and was living in London. They were helped by Aurelio Natoli. In Spain Bibbi and Zamboni enrolled in a training programme for flight pilots. The enterprise was wrecked by a shortage of funding and a succession of fallings out between those involved. Assunto Zamboni fell victim to a network of OVRA agents from Italy and in the end was "persuaded" to become an informant. Nevertheless, Bibbi remained in Spain for some months, during which he seems to have avoided the attentions of the Italian government representatives and, as matters turned out, learned to fly a plane. In Spain he worked closely with Gigi Damiani, a larger than life figure among the exiled Italian anarchists during this time. They worked with others on a bold scheme to use an aeroplane to liberate and extract from Italy the seriously sick anarcho-socialist journalist Errico Malatesta, who had been kidnapped in Rome by fascist paramilitaries. Funding was obtained from sections in the CNT (Spanish Trades Union Confederation). However, this plan too was thwarted by a lack of discipline on the part of comrades who breached their secrecy instructions by discussing it with Ángel Pestaña, a Spanish anarchist. Pestaña blew the whistle, writing in the union newspaper "Solidaridad obrera" ("Workers' solidarity"), after becoming convinced that the Italian gang in their midst had plans for the funds provided by the Spanish trades unionists that were very much less noble than claimed.

Meanwhile, Bibbi resumed his wanderings, motivated by the need to find work, but still unremitting in his political engagement. By the end of 1931 he was in North Africa where he remained until he first part of 1934. In Algeria he found a job with a company from which it appears that he had at some point managed to complete his engineering training. He spent longer in Tunisia, where he was joined by Clara Cirino. In every report of his activities during this period, he is reported to have been surrounded by "implacable antifascists", identified as "republicans" or "giellisti", and the accompanying (Italian) government spies.

Among the anarchist with whom he engaged most frequently in Tunis, observers identified Vincenzo Mazzoni, Giulio Barresi, Nicolò Converti, Antonino Casubolo and Luigi "Gigi" Damiani. It was with Damiani that he would team up to produce the short-lived periodical "I Domani" ("Tomorros") during the summer of 1935. Two other men deserving a mention in this context are Modestino Guerriero and Francesco Castellana, also identified as trusted operatives Nos. 489 and 467 alias "Carlo" and "Averardo" of the OVRA, without whose regular reports to the Chief of Police back in Rome, this information on Bibbi's movements and contacts during his time in North Africa would probably have gone largely unremarked by subsequent researchers. On 22 July 1932 the colonial authorities, probably in response to pressure from the Italian government, sent out a decree expelling Bibbi from the colonial territory, which eventually found its way to the anarchist from Carrara slightly more than a year later, on 18 August 1933, while he was at Blida (Algeria). When the news of the expulsion decree became known, antifascist opinion quickly rallied in opposition to it. The move was condemned by Bibbi's political allies in contributions to Tunisia's francophone press, leading to the suspension of the expulsion decree.

=== Spain ===
In 1934 Bibbi returned to Spain with his friend Baldassare Londero, whom he had known since 1929 when they had both been confined on the Island of Lipari. They set up a little canning factory for agricultural produce and concentrates on behalf of a French industrialist in Gandia, just outside Valencia. The local Italian consul accused them of using the facilities to manufacture weapons for anarchists. The Italian police, possibly taking their lead from the Italian consul on the spot, became convinced that Bibbi and Londero were working on new plans to attack the leader, for which the entrepreneurial activity at the canning factory was simply a front organisation. Beyond the sources based on Italian government informants there is no surviving evidence in support of such suspicions, however: other sources insist that Bibbi's principal preoccupation at this stage was on remaining solvent.

=== Lolita ===
By 1936 Bibby's partnership with Clara Cirino was over, and in March 1936 he married María de los Dolores Ausias "Lolita" Marata, described in one source as "a local girl". In May 1936, after a long separation, his sister Maria came to stay with them and write a report of her visit to her brother and his new wife. She was able to report back to their uncle Domenico, who was struggling to sustain what remained of the family business in Avenza, notwithstanding harassment by the authorities and local fascist thugs. She wrote that her brother was less than satisfied with his working conditions at the little packaging factory, but there was reason to believe that things would improve over time. She also reported back to others in Italy. While her brother undertook his factory work, during her stay she was able to help Lolita run the house and look after "the hens, the dogs, the pigeons and the goat" (which, apart from the dogs, were presumably kept as food sources). There were frequent visitors to the house, and passionate discussions on contemporary politics. Clearly Bibbi and his visitors were well informed on the latest developments in respect of resurgent Italian imperialism and of Germany where "Hitler was putting in place systems to eliminate all those whom he considered subhuman: that is to say Jews, Slavs, homosexuals, the handicapped, communists and Jehovah's witnesses". The marriage was followed by the births of the couple's two children, Marco and Camilla.

=== Spanish Civil War ===
Revolution broke out in Spain in July 1936, marking what quickly came to be seen as the outbreak of the Spanish Civil War. Thanks to his engineering skills and training Bibbi was initially involved in the urgent tasks around reconfiguring and reorganising a range of production facilities in the industrial areas surrounding Valencia. The timelines in the sources become somewhat blurred in respect of his activities during the Civil War years between 1936 and 1939. There are references to his having used his piloting skills, for instance in terms of "flying reconnaissance flights", but having moved on quite soon after finding that the republican air force had come under the control of "Stalinist" elements. His activities during the Civil War evidently also involved him in frequent travel between Valencia and Barcelona and further afield, notably to Paris. It was in Paris that on 13 October 1936 Bibbi was suddenly arrested and sentenced to an eight-day prison sentence in respect of a new "infringement of a decree of expulsion". Back in Spain, it appears that he was keen to enlist as an aviator, to judge by a surviving message dated 3 November 1936, and sent from the Italian consulate in Tunis to the Interior Ministry in Rome, though the message in question is not entirely clear on the point. In December 1936 he was arrested by the local (republican) police and narrowly avoided being lynched by a crowd that quickly gathered round and accused him of being a "Mussolini spy". His life was saved only through the intervention of the Valencia regional CNT (trades union confederation) and the local council from Gandia, the nearby village in which he was still living with his family. During this part of the civil war he seems to have engaged in "unseen warfare", engaged in sabotage actions behind the frontlines, and in "arms procurement and smuggling" on behalf of republican fighters. Bibbi was nevertheless hampered in his effectiveness not just by the surveillance squads monitoring the role of Italian exiled anarchists in the fighting, but also by the constant attentions of Togliatti's "secret police". Togliatti's first loyalty was not to any Italian party but to Stalin, whom many across Europe on the non-anarchist political left continued to view as the best hope for a non-fascist future. It was Togliatti who is believed to have ordered and choreographed the deaths of Berneri and Francesco Barnieri during May 1937.

One relatively well recorded episode concerns Bibbi's involvement in the mission planned by his friend Giobbe Giopp to undertake an attack on nationalist ships anchored at the port of Ceuta (a Spanish coastal enclave surrounded in its landward sides by Morocco). The operation was authorized by Indalecio Prieto, the government minister responsible for the navy and the air force, but something went wrong and the group, consisting of Tommasini, Giopp, Fontana and Cimadori (the informant for the Italian security services), were all arrested on 20 February 1937 by the republican police service of Alicante or by the "Stalinist Guardia de Asalto" (surviving perspectives differ) while making their way along the road to Altea. They were imprisoned for several weeks in Valencia, to where they had been taken, on suspicion of "activities for on behalf of enemy" ("attività al servizio del nemico"). They were interrogated, threatened and beaten Bibbi was arrested a few days later than the others. Tommasini managed to escape. For the others, it was only after several high-profile Italian exiled anti-fascists and CNT comrades had interceded with the Juan García Oliver, the Minister of Justice in the republican government, and the man who had already agreed the Ceuta escapade on behalf of central government, that pressure from Madrid on the authorities in Valencia secured release for the Italian detainees. Nor was this the last incident of its kind. On 12 April 1937 three of the Italian political exiled comrades were arrested at Valencia by the government police service of Alicante (also identified as the local "Stalinist Guardia de Asalto").

=== The killing of Baldassare Londero ===
In their dealings with him during 1937/38 the Valencia police, became greatly preoccupied with persistent reports that Bibbi had some sort of "direct responsibility for the death of Londero in Barcelona". It is generally accepted that Baldassare Londero died - almost certainly that he was killed - during the first half of November 1936, but the precise date, location and other circumstances of the killing are not yet established. More detailed rumours concerning Bibbi's involvement in the killing of his former business partner were bizarrely specific and persistent, but they were never proven, and Bibbi himself would always deny that he had any involvement in Londero's death. The Italian security services and sources based on their records, presumably taking their lead from the republican police reports in Spain, came to believe that Bibbi had "ordered the killing of Londero over a question of money" ("... a ordinare l’uccisione di Londero per una questione di denaro"). Shortly after being released following his arrest in Valencia, Bibbi escaped to France and made his way to Paris. In France he remained under surveillance by Bernardo Cremonini and/or his agents of the Italian security services. According to a report submitted by Cremonini on 19 November 1938, Bibbi was also followed into France by two men from Spain "who accused him of having stolen items of great value" in Spain, and were under orders to eliminate him. It remains unclear where responsibilities lay in respect of the "Londero affair". The most plausible version indicates that Londero met his end in 7 November, or at least at some point between November and 9 November 1938. He was killed either at El Prat de Llobregat (near the site currently occupied by Barcelona airport) or at a location close to the Franco-Spanish border. The killers were either a firing squad drawn from the "Patrullas de control", a semi-autonomous anti-fascist police force that operated in Catalonia during the Civil War years, or else, perhaps, a Valencian anarchist rival known by the name "Francisco Bellver". There is less uncertainty as to motive. The intention of the killers was almost certainly to relieve Londero of a large quantity of jewellery and precious stones that had gone missing in Madrid and that their victim was in the process of trying to expatriate to France. Bibbi's own explanation for his former friend's killing was provided only many years later, and is not necessarily incompatible with these subsequently distilled versions of what happened: "he was a smuggler and a dodgy businessman, involved in the robbery of money and jewels in collusion with the Minister of the Interior, Ángel Galarza. He was killed, I believe on the French border, as he left the country, loaded with all manner of precious things. People accused me, but I was completely uninvolved".

=== South America ===
Sources differ over Bibbi's movements and whereabout between 1938 and 1948. Believing that the French authorities might, in response to pressure from the Italian government, expel him from the country and so hand him over to the Italian police, and sensing that his life was in any case danger both from Stalinist elements and from fascist elements taking their orders from Italy, at some stage Bibby escaped with his family to South America, but it is unclear whether his took place in 1938, during the early 1940s, or only after 1945. Two of the more persuasive sources state that it was in 1938 that he took the decision to emigrate to Brazil, and having accepted a job offer from the "Compagnie Internationale des Minerals et Métaux" successfully applied for a standard Italian passport at the Italian embassy in Paris, before undertaking the journey from Marseille to South America on the steam ship "Florida". He settled in São Paulo and found work. He stayed out of politics, although he sustained contacts with other Italian political exiles and continued to correspond with several comrades from his days as an anarchist activist in Europe. In South America he found numerous opportunities to travel outside Brazil. He corresponded particularly frequently with Giovanna Berneri, the widow of his murdered friend Camillo Berneri, and with their daughter Giliana. Another close friendship is evidenced by his war-time correspondence with Giobbe Giopp, who had found his own refuge from Italian fascism in Mexico. Bibbi also supported Giopp with a heartfelt defence many years later, after returning to Italy, when Giopp faced lingering accusations from communist opponents that he had been "an ambiguous character" and an informant for the Italian security services during the Mussolini years.

=== Final fifty years ===
Gino Bibby lived out the second half of his life in relative obscurity. In 1948 he returned with his wife and two sons to his homebase in the Carrara region, resuming friendships with some of the surviving comrades to whom he had been close before being driven into exile. His experiences in Italy and Spain during the 1930s had left him implacably hostile to "international communism", seen by many after 1945 across western and central Europe as a poorly disguised surrogate for Stalin's still unquenched imperial ambitions. Bibbi's priorities were both his work as an engineer and political work behind the scenes in the anarchist movement. He was deeply critical of the Carrara branch of the Italian Anarchist Federation, believing them to have become bizarrely subordinated to the policies of the PCI (Italian Communist Party). Many years later an interview was made public in which Bibbi recalled his return to Europe in 1948: "... I was surprised that Italy had been turned communist. What was considered as 'red fascism' had taken over in Italy". (Note: “Sono arrivato e ho avuto la sorpresa che l’Italia era comunistizzata. Quello che noi consideravamo il fascismo rosso era diventato padrone dell’Italia.”)

During the second week in December 1950 Bibbi took part in the FAI congress at Ancona as part of a three-man delegation from the Carrara branch. The other two were Ugo Mazzucchelli and a man called Giuseppe Raffaelli. He was in attendance again in May 1951 at the National Convention for Political Victims at Bologna. The early 1950s was a period during which he re-embraced some of the most powerful friendships he had made in Spain, notably with Romualdo Del Papa and Randolfo Pacciardi. Pacciardi, who was a member of the post-war Italian government between 1948 and 1953, was something of a political soulmate. In particular, their experiences in Spain had left them with an enduring shared mistrust of the Italy's well-funded and unfailingly slick Communist Party.

By 1960, despite still defining himself as an anarchist, Bibbi was moving away from mainstream Italian anarchism. He became a member of Pacciardi's "New Republic" group, combining his traditionalist anarchism with the politics of the anti-communist "Fronte Unico". His willingness implicitly to embrace the presidential tendencies of Pacciardi's movement, set in tandem with his continuing adherence to old-fashioned anarchist principals, gave rise to contradictions to which commentators have been happy to draw attention, but of which Bibbi gave every indication of being unaware. His positions nevertheless led to hostility if intensifying harshness between Bibbi and certain of his anarchist former comrades such as, in particular Failla, Mazzucchelli and Marzocchi which led, by the end of that decade, to Bibbi's irreversible breach with mainstream anarchism. His point of no return may have arisen in September 1968 when he attended the International Convention of Anarchist Federations, conveniently held on that occasion in Carrara. A fellow delegate was Daniel Cohn-Bendit who, slightly improbably, had joined the French Anarchist Federation the previous year. Bibbi was withering: "They have come to propose a united front of the left! This stuff is fifty years old. Suicidal!". (Note: Sono venuti a proporre il fronte unito delle sinistre! Roba di cinquant'anni fa. Un suicidio!) Stalin had been dead for fifteen years, but for Bibbi and other anarchists with long memories, the danger was undiminished.

The presidential system and plurality voting were two defining aspirations of the "New Republic" party which never found favour with either the Christian Democrats or the Communists, the two parties which created the political weather. The way in which Pacciardi, as the leader of new "New Republic", took so much of his political inspiration from Charles de Gaulle also attracted suspicion from mainstream political liberalism and the centre-left, both of which were better represented among the media commentariat than in the country's political hierarchies. Increasingly "New Republic" came to be labelled as "neo-fascist". Gino Bibbi, as both a close friend of Pacciardi and one of the movement's best known members, fell foul of this development. He himself faced trial at Lucca in connection with his alleged associations with the anti-communist "Movimento di Azione Rivoluzionaria", a fringe terrorist grouping founded by Carlo Fumagalli which had also attracted the neo-fascist label. It remains not entirely clear whether Bibbi ever had contacts with the terrorist group, but in terms of the matters alleged before the court in Tuscany he was acquitted on all charges.

After these experiences Bibbi spent the final quarter century of his life, still resolutely identifying himself as an old-fashioned anarchist, and still completely estranged from the contemporary institutions of anarchism and their leaders. After he died on 8 August 1999, slightly more than six months after his one hundredth birthday, Gino Bibbi's mortal remains were sent for cremation with the red and black anarchist scarf fastened securely around the neck.
