= Agostino Casali =

Italian politician (1920–2015)

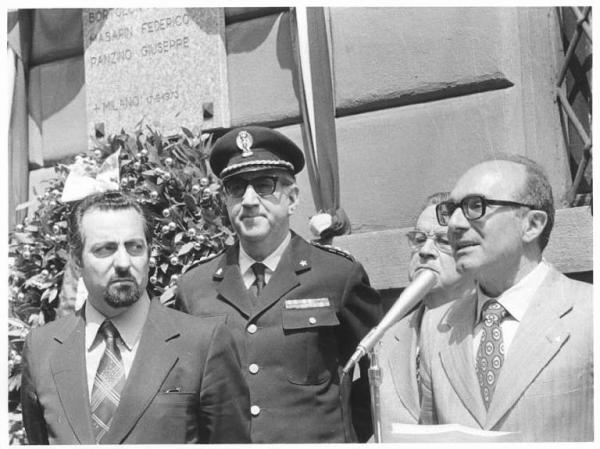
- Casali (right) during a ceremony in 1975

President of ANPI
- In office 5 February 2006 – 17 June 2009
- Preceded by: Arrigo Boldrini
- Succeeded by: Raimondo Ricci

Personal details
- Born: 25 April 1920 Milan, Italy
- Died: 29 October 2015 (aged 95) Milan, Italy
- Party: Italian Communist Party
- Occupation: Politician

Agostino Casali known as Tino (25 April 1920 – 29 October 2015) was an Italian politician and partisan. From 2006 to 2009, he was President of National Association of Italian Partisans.

== Biography ==
When the Armistice of Cassibile was signed in 1943, Casali was in France where, under the pseudonym of Auguste Colombani, fought against Nazists in Collobrières. Casali returned to Italy and collaborated in the organization of the Patriotic Action Groups in Milan, with the nickname of Tino. He played a leading role in the general insurrection that led to the liberation of Milan from the Nazi-fascist troops.

After the war, Casali became one of the founders of the National Association of Italian Partisans and has been for many years a city councilor in Milan, elected with the Italian Communist Party. In 1969 he promoted the establishment of the "Anti-Fascist Standing Committee against Terrorism for the Defense of the Republican Order".

In 2006, after the resignation of Arrigo Boldrini, Casali was elected national president of ANPI, which he directed with operational roles until 2009.

He died on 29 October 2015, at the age of 95.
