= Carlo Smuraglia =

Italian politician (1923–2022)

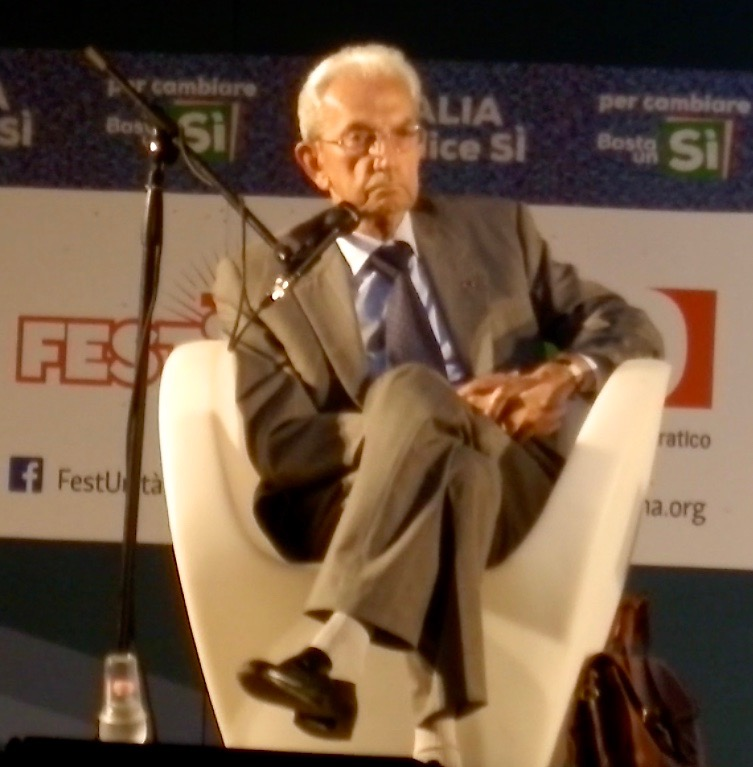
- Smuraglia during the debate against Matteo Renzi before the 2016 constitutional referendum

President of ANPI
- In office 16 April 2011 – 3 November 2017
- Preceded by: Raimondo Ricci
- Succeeded by: Carla Federica Nespolo

Member of the Senate
- In office 23 April 1992 – 29 May 2001
- Constituency: Rho (1992–1994); Rozzano (1994–2001)

Personal details
- Born: 12 August 1923 Ancona, Italy
- Died: 30 May 2022 (aged 98) Milan, Italy
- Party: PCI (until 1991); PDS (1991–1998); DS (1998–2007)
- Education: Sant'Anna School of Advanced Studies; University of Pisa
- Occupation: Politician, academic, lawyer

Carlo Smuraglia (12 August 1923 – 30 May 2022) was an Italian politician and partisan who served as President of National Association of Italian Partisans from 2011 to 2017.

== During the Resistance ==
Smuraglia began studying law in Pisa, when in 1943, with the Armistice of Cassibile, he left the university. He refused to join the Italian Social Republic and took part instead in the Italian resistance movement joining the "Cremona" Combat Group, with which he fought against nazi-fascists from Marche to Venice, until the Surrender of Caserta in 1945.

== After the War ==
Smuraglia returned to University and graduated at the Sant'Anna School of Advanced Studies and at the University of Pisa, beginning his political career as provincial councilor for Justice at the Province of Pisa.

He taught Labor Law in the University of Milan and the University of Pavia and was later elected regional councilor in Lombardy and appointed President of the Regional Assembly from 1978 to 1980.

From 1986 to 1990, Smuraglia has been a member of the High Council of the Judiciary, then led by President Francesco Cossiga.

From 1992 to 2001, Smuraglia has been elected to the Senate with the Democratic Party of the Left and was at the head of the Labour Committee of the Senate from 1994 to 2001.

== President of ANPI ==
From April 2011 to November 2017, Smuraglia was elected President of the National Association of Italian Partisans. In 2016, he said that ANPI would have supported "No" in occasion of the 2016 constitutional referendum proposed by Prime Minister Matteo Renzi.

== Death ==
Smuraglia died in Milan on 30 May 2022, at the age of 98.

== Electoral history ==
Election	House	Constituency	Party	Votes	Result
1970	Regional Council of Lombardy	Milan	PCI	4,770	Elected
1975	Regional Council of Lombardy	Milan	PCI	35,215	Elected
1980	Regional Council of Lombardy	Milan	PCI	20,069	Elected
1992	Senate of the Republic	Rho	PDS	68,443	Elected
1994	Senate of the Republic	Rozzano	PDS	52,721	Elected
1996	Senate of the Republic	Rozzano	PDS	67,359	Elected
