= Gianfranco Pagliarulo =

Italian politician (born 1949)

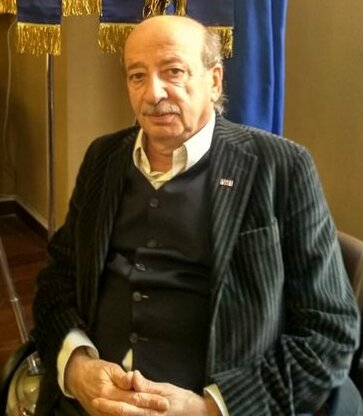

President of ANPI
- Incumbent
- Assumed office 30 October 2020
- Preceded by: Carla Federica Nespolo

Member of the Senate
- In office 30 May 2001 – 27 April 2006
- Constituency: Lombardy

Personal details
- Born: 16 September 1949 (age 76) Bari, Italy
- Party: PCI (until 1991); PRC (1991–1998); PdCI (1998–2005); SD (2007); PD (2007–2008)
- Occupation: Politician, journalist

Gianfranco Pagliarulo (born 16 September 1949) is an Italian politician, President of National Association of Italian Partisans since 2020.

== Biography ==
Pagliarulo has been elected Senator at the 2001 Italian political election, being one of the two MP elected with the Party of Italian Communists that year.

In November 2017, Pagliarulo was appointed Vicepresident of the National Association of Italian Partisans, under the guidance of Carla Nespolo. In October 2020, after Nespolo's death, Pagliarulo was elected President of ANPI.
