= Italian partisan brigades =

Anti-fascist resistance units (1943–45)

Flag of the Italian resistance movement

The Italian partisan brigades were armed formations involved in the Italian resistance during the World War II.

They were formed on voluntary base by irregular soldiers and sometimes were organized by former army members who served in the Italian occupied territories. Those formations had been active between the 8 September 1943 (with the Badoglio Proclamation) and the end of the war on 6 May 1945.

== History ==
During the WWII, groups of partisans were formed after the Badoglio Proclamation by former members of the Royal Italian Army located in the north centre of Italy and in the territories occupied by the Kingdom like those of the Balkans. The former soldiers were then flanked by anti-fascists, exiles and expatriates.

In the autumn of 1943, the Direction of the Italian Communist Party suggested the formation of organized structures and promoted the creation of the Garibaldi battalions. These groups were conceived as assault brigades because they had to be immediately active but the organization would be formed during their activity.

=== Components ===
During the war, new formations were continuously created until April 1945, and an important event was the creation of the General Command of Corpo Volontari della Libertà (CVL, "Corps of Freedom Volunteers") on 9 June 1944 in Milan, where the headquarters of main partisan organizations were located. The CVL represented the partisan movement among Allies and the Italian government and it had the purpose of coordinate brigades and local National Liberation Committees.

According to the communist members, the brigade formation implied a military-like model of organization with a hierarchy formed by General Command, divisions, brigades, battalions, companies, squads and groups. It was also introduced the charge of the "political commissar" according to the experiences of the October Revolution and the International Brigades during the Spanish Civil War. This kind of organization would be realized only in summer 1944, when also the other parties adopted the military-political structure, with or without "commissars" representing the party of reference.

Brigades of army-men were formed mainly abroad by former soldiers and officers who did not submit to be humiliated and imprisoned by the Nazis. After the Armistice of Cassibile, Allies allowed the Kingdom to reorganize the remaining army forces which were initially left without any order but most soldiers decided to join the resistance brigades already active.

According to the newspaper Avvenire, catholic formations were often in contrast with the other ones of different political sides, but during the liberation war there was still a collaboration from both the sides. Catholics who actively took part to the Resistance were 65,000 - 80,000 out of about 200,000 partisans.

During the Resistance various formations merged and subdivided according to the situations of the operative areas, with different criteria and sizes. For example, some Garibaldi groups had a pyramidal structure:

- The Squad (Squadra), which was the lowest unit which was formed by 10-20 combatants
- Three Squads formed a Company (Compagnia) or Detachment (Distaccamento), with 30-60 combatants
- Three Companies or Detachment formed a Battalion (Battaglione) of 90-180 combatants
- Three Battalions formed a Brigade (Brigata) of 270-540 combatants
- Three Brigades formed a Division (Divisione) of 810-1620 combatants

=== Political affiliations ===
Within the Corpo volontari della libertà there were the following political affiliations:

- Brigate Garibaldi, GAP and SAP were related to the Italian Communist Party (PCI)
- Brigate Giustizia e Libertà, led by Ferruccio Parri, were related to the Action Party (PdA)
- Brigate Matteotti were related to the Italian Socialist Party of Proletarian Unity (the name of the Italian Socialist Party at the time) led by Sandro Pertini and Giuseppe Saragat.
- Brigate del popolo, Brigate Fiamme Verdi and Brigate Osoppo were related to the Christian Democracy (DC) and the catholic religion in general.
- Brigate Mazzini were related to the Italian Republican Party (PRI).
- The formations called badogliane (also known as azzurre or autonome) were mainly formed by those with liberal or conservative ideals, united by their loyalty towards the Monarchy. Born among the divisions of the Royal Army, they were affiliated with the House of Savoy and recognized Raffaele Cadorna as their military leader. The azzurre formations maintained their hierarchical structure and they could give to the Resistance their war expertise and relations with the Allied Forces, essential for supplies and aids.
- Organizzazione Franchi of Edgardo Sogno represented the Italian Liberal Party and the monarchicals.
- There were also Trotskyist organizations, like the Movimento Comunista d'Italia, and anarchic formations like Brigate Bruzzi Malatesta of Milan.

Sometimes names were not closely linked to the relative parties: for example, the Osoppo Brigades of Friuli, which were born with an important contributions of PdA, accepted their dependence on DC and the Friulian clergy. The Brigate Fiamme Verdi diversified themselves in the territory: the Lombard ones, formed by catholic intellectuals, became exclusive military formations with a liberal orientation; the ones of Reggio Emilia, instead, were directly led by DC as the Brigate del Popolo. The Mazzini Brigades in Veneto did not have a close relationship with PRI as the Lombard ones.

== Partisan mountain formations in April 1945 ==
=== In Italy ===
The following is a list of Division and Brigade Commands of partisan formations which operated in the mountains of centre-north Italy in April 1945, classified by partisan and historian Roberto Battaglia.

There were:

- 46 Garibaldi formations
- 33 GL (Giustizia e Libertà)
- 12 Matteotti
- 4 Fiamme Verdi
- 15 autonomous formations

No.	Operative areas	Formations	Notes
1	Milan	Comando generale CVL Corpo volontari della libertà	
2	Ossola	Divisione Garibaldi Redi	
3	Ossola	Divisione Valtoce	
4	Ossola	Divisione Flaim	
5	Ossola	Divisione Beltrami	
6	Varese	Divisione Alto Milanese	
7	Varese	Brigata Greppi	
8	Varese	Brigata Passerini	
9	Varese	1ª Brigata Loto	
10	Varese	Divisione Garibaldi Fratelli Varalli	
11	Varese	Divisione Garibaldi Pajetta	
12	II Aosta Valley	C 1ª Brigata Autonoma. Valle d'Aosta	
13	II Aosta Valley	Divisione Matteotti Aosta	
14	II Aosta Valley	7ª Divisione Garibaldi Piemonte Elter	
15	II Aosta Valley	2ª Divisione Alpina GL Ferriera	
16	II Aosta Valley	Brigata Autonoma GL Leone	
17	I Biellese	5ª Divisione Garibaldi R. Maffei	
18	I Biellese	12ª Divisione Garibaldi Piemonte Nedo	
19	III Canavesan Lanzo	8ª Divisione Autonoma Giovane Piemonte	
20	III Canavesan Lanzo	Raggruppamento Brigata Matteotti Davito	
21	III Canavesan Lanzo	7ª Divisione Garibaldi GL Canavesana	
22	III Canavesan Lanzo	Colonna GL R.Giua	
23	III Canavesan Lanzo	2ª e 4ª Divisione Garibaldi Piemonte Unificate	
24	IV Susa - Chisone	Brigata Matteotti Martorelli	
25	IV Susa - Chisone	4ª Divisione Alpina GL Stellina	
26	IV Susa - Chisone	3ª Divisione Garibaldi P.Deo	
27	IV Susa - Chisone	10ª Divisione Autonoma Val Chisone	
28	IV Susa - Chisone	13ª Divisione Garibaldi Pietrorame	
29	IV Susa - Chisone	9ª Divisione Autonoma De Vitis	
30	IV Susa - Chisone	Divisione GL Campana	
31	IV Susa - Chisone	5ª Divisione Alpina GL S.Tosa	
32	IV Susa - Chisone	Divisione GL Torino	
33	IV Susa - Chisone	Divisione Matteotti Giachino	
33a	V Sangone Valley	Divisione Autonoma Valsangone	
34	VI Monferrat Langhe	5ª Divisione Autonoma. Monferrato	
35	VI Monferrat Langhe	GMO GL	
36	VI Monferrat Langhe	Divisione Matteotti Rossi	
37	VI Monferrat Langhe	6ª Divisione Autonoma. Alpi	
38	VI Monferrat Langhe	9ª Divisione GL Ferreira	
39	VI Monferrat Langhe	I Divisione Garibaldi Piemonte Lanfranco	
40	VI Monferrat Langhe	Divisione Matteotti Cattaneo	
41	VI Monferrat Langhe	8ª Divisione Garibaldi Piemonte Asti	
42	VI Monregalese Langhe	9ª Divisione Garibaldi Piemonte Imerito	
43	VI Monregalese Langhe	C IV Brigata Autonoma. Brà	
44	VI Monregalese Langhe	3ª Divisione GL Langhe	
45	VI Monregalese Langhe	11º Garibaldi Piemonte Langhe	
46	Left plain of Tanaro	103ª Brigata Autonoma Amendola	Colonel commander Renato Gancia
47	VI Monregalese Langhe	14ª Divisione Garibaldi Piemonte Capriolo	
48	VI Monregalese Langhe	2ª Divisione Autonoma. Langhe	Piero Balbo - Enrico Martini general commander
49	VI Monregalese Langhe	1ª Divisione Autonoma. Langhe	
50	VI Monregalese Langhe	4ª Divisione Autonoma. Alpina	
51	V West Cuneo	Divisione Matteotti Lungense	
52	V West Cuneo	2ª Divisione Alpina GL	
53	V West Cuneo	10ª Divisione GL	
54	V West Cuneo	11ª Divisione Garibaldi Piemonte Cuneo	
55	V West Cuneo	XXV ª Brigata GL Bellano	
56	V West Cuneo	XXI ª Brigata GL Paglieri	
57	V West Cuneo	1ª Divisione Alpina GL	
58	V West Cuneo	3 ª Divisione Autonoma. Alpi	
59	Imperia	Divisione Garibaldi Cascione	
60	Imperia	Divisione Garibaldi Bonfante	
61	II Savona	Divisione Bevilacqua	
62	II Savona	Divisione Panevino	
63	II Savona	Divisione Fumagalli	
64	VII Alessandria	2ª Divisione Autonoma. Patria	
65	VII Alessandria	10 ª Divisione Garibaldi Piemonte Italia	
66	VII Alessandria	8 ª Divisione GL.	
67	VII Alessandria	16 ª Divisione Garibaldi Piemonte Viganò	
68	VII Alessandria	Divisione Matteotti Marengo	
69	Oltrepò Pavese	Divisione Matteotti Barni	
70	Oltrepò Pavese	4 ª Divisione Garibaldi Lombardia Gramsci	
71	Oltrepò Pavese	2 ª Divisione GL Masia	
72	Oltrepò Pavese	3 ª Divisione Garibaldi Lombardia Aliotta	
73	VI Zone (between Alessandria and Genoa)	Divisione Garibaldi Pinan Cichero	
74	VI Zone (between Alessandria and Genoa)	Divisione Garibaldi Cichero	
75	VI Zone (between Alessandria and Genoa)	Brigata Caio	
76	VI Zone (between Alessandria and Genoa)	Divisione GL Matteotti	
77	VI Zone (between Alessandria and Genoa)	Divisione Garibaldi Coduri	Eraldo Fico
78	XIII Piacenza	1ª Divisione GL Piacenza	
79	XIII Piacenza	Divisione Garibaldi Bersani Val d'Arda	
80	XIII Piacenza	Divisione Valnure	
81	East-West Cisa Parma	Divisione Valceno	
82	East-West Cisa Parma	Divisione Valtaro	
83	East-West Cisa Parma	Divisione Garibaldi Monte Orsaro	
84	East-West Cisa Parma	Divisione Cisa	
85	East-West Cisa Parma	Divisione Garibaldi Ricci	
86	IV La Spezia	Divisione Garibaldi Picchiara	
87	IV La Spezia	Brigata Borrini	
88	IV La Spezia	Divisione Garibaldi Centocroci	
89	IV La Spezia	Brigata Muccini	
90	IV La Spezia	Brigata Giustizia e Libertà	
90	Reggio Emilia	Brigata Fiamme Verdi (RE)	
91	Reggio Emilia	1ª Divisione Garibaldi Reggiana	
92	Modena	Divisione Modena Pianura	
93	Modena	Divisione Modena Armando	
94	Modena	Divisione Modena Montagna.	
95	Bologna	Divisione Bologna Pianura.	
96	Bologna	Divisione Bologna Montagna	
97	Forlì	Divisione Leggera Forlì	
98	Ravenna	Divisione Leggera Ravenna	
99	Ferrara	Brigata Ferrara	
100	Rovigo	Brigata Tasso	
101	Rovigo	Brigata Bonato	
102	Plain of Verona	Brigata "Verona"	Commander "Redi" (Renato Tisato)
103	Plain of Verona	Brigata "Anita"	Commander "Gallo" (Cesare Albertini)
104	Plain of Verona	Brigata "Stella Rossa"	Commander "Spartaco" (Armando Plazzi)
105	Plain of Verona	Brigata "Adige"	Commander "Romeo" (Di Lorenzo Francesco)
106	Plain of Verona	Brigata "Scaligera"	Commander "Cambrone" (Giovanni Ballarotto)
107	Plain of Verona	Brigata "Italia"	Commander "Enzo" (Fiorenzo Olivieri)
108	Plain of Verona	Brigata "Stella Pianura"	Commander "Siva" (Marcello Perazzolo)
109	Plain of Verona	Brigata "Carlo Montanari"	Commander "Ettore" (Enzo Falcetta)
110	Vicenza	Brigata Vicenza	Giacomo Prandina
111	Padua	Brigata Damiano Chiesa	Vito Olivetti
112	Padua	Brigata Silvio Trentin	
113	Padua	Brigata Garibaldi (PD)	
114	Padua	Brigata Lubian GL	
115	Padua	Brigata Negri	
116	Padua	Brigata Pierobon	
117	Padua	Brigata Rutoli	
118	Venezia Mestre	Brigata Ruspo	
119	Venezia Mestre	Brigata Pellegrini	Antonio Pellegirini "Carlo"
120	Venezia Mestre	Brigata Piave (VE)	
121	Venezia Mestre	Brigata Erminio Ferretto	
122	Venezia Mestre	Brigata Iberati	
123	Venezia Mestre	Brigata Gramsci (VE)	
124	Venezia Mestre	Brigata Conti	
125	Friuli	5ª Divisione Garibaldi Osoppo Friuli	
126	Friuli	Divisione Carnia	
127	Friuli	Divisione Sinistra Tagliamento	
128	Friuli	Divisione Destra Tagliamento	
129	Friuli	Divisione Sud Arzino	
130	Friuli	Brigata Rosselli (Friuli).	
131	Friuli	Brigata Picelli	
132	Friuli	3ª Divisione Garibaldi Osoppo Friuli	
133	Friuli	1ª Divisione Garibaldi Osoppo Friuli	
134	Friuli	Divisione Udine	
135	Friuli	2ª Divisione Garibaldi Osoppo Friuli	
136	Friuli	4ª Divisione Garibaldi Osoppo Friuli	
137	Treviso	Brigata Bortolato.	
138	Treviso	Brigata Tito Speri	
139	Treviso	Brigata Furlan	Antonio Furlan
140	Treviso	Brigata Orerto	
141	Padua - Treviso	Divisione Garibaldi Sabatucci	
142	Treviso	Brigata Zancanaro	
143	Treviso	Brigata Badini	
144	Treviso	Brigata Treviso	
145	Piave (Belluno)	Brigata 7º Alpini.	
146	Piave (Belluno)	Brigata Val Cordevole	
147	Piave (Belluno)	Divisione Garibaldi Belluno	
148	Piave (Belluno)	Brigata Fulmine	
149	Piave (Belluno)	Divisione Garibaldi N. Nannetti	Francesco Pesce
150	Piave (Belluno)	Brigata Piave	
151	Monte Grappa	Divisione Monte Grappa	
152	Mount Ortigara (Asiago plateau)	Divisione Monte Ortigara	Commander Giacomo Chilesotti
153	Bolzano	Divisione Val dell'Adige	
154	Trento	Divisione Garibaldi "Ateo Garemi"	Commander "Alberto" (Nello Boscagli)
155	Verona (Lessini)	Brigata "Luciano Manara"	Commander "Paolo" (Luciano Dal Cero)
156	Verona (Lessini)	Brigata "Pierobon"	Commander "Elvio" (Bortolo Antonio Deganello)
157	Verona (Lessini)	Brigata "Avesani"	Commander "Gianni" (Gianpietro Marini)
158	Sondrio	1ª Divisione Alpina GL Valtellina.	Commander "Camillo" (Giuseppe Motta)
159	Brescia	L 4ª Brigata Garibaldi Belotti	
160	Brescia	Divisione Fiamme Verdi Tito Speri	
161	Brescia	Brigata GL Monte Suello	
162	Brescia	7ª Brigata Matteotti	
163	Brescia	C 22ª Brigata Garibaldi (BS)	
164	Brescia	Divisione Fiamme Verdi Lunardi	
165	Brescia	Brigata GL Barnaba	
166	Brescia	Gruppo Brigata Apolitiche - III settore.	
167	Brescia	Formazione Chiari - V settore.	
168	Bergamo	Divisione Garibaldi (BG)	
169	Bergamo	Divisione GL Orobica	
170	Bergamo	Divisione Fiamme Verdi (BG)	
171	Como Lecco	1ª Divisione Garibaldi Lombardia.	
172	Como Lecco	2ª Divisione Garibaldi Lombardia	
173	Como Lecco	16ª Divisione GL	
174	Como Lecco	Divisione Puecher	
175	Como Lecco	Brigata Piazza (Como)	
176	Como Lecco	Brigata Benetta	
177	Como Lecco	C 4ª Brigata Citterio	
178	VI Zone (between Alessandria and Genoa)	Divisione Garibaldi Mingo	

== Other partisan formations ==
The following are the Divisional and Brigade commands of partisan formations which operated during the Resistance and had not been classified by Battaglia.

No.	Operative areas	Formations	Notes
1	VI Zone (between Alessandria and Genoa)	Battaglioni Matteotti Valbisagno	
2	Como- Lecco	55ª Brigata F.lli Rosselli	See No. 172 of the previous table
3	Umbria	Brigata Garibaldi "Antonio Gramsci"	
4	Rome	Bandiera Rossa	
5	Marzabotto	Brigata Partigiana Stella Rossa	
6	Venice	Brigata partigiana Martiri di Mirano	
7	Massa	Battaglione Lucetti	
8	Friuli	Brigata Osoppo	See No. 125,132,133,135,136 of the previous table
9	Apuan Alps	Divisione partigiana Lunense	
10	Ravenna (plain)	28ª Brigata Garibaldi "Mario Gordini"	Arrigo Boldrini
11	Umbria	Brigata Risorgimento	
12	Pistoia	XI Zona Patrioti	
13	Tigullio	Divisione "Coduri"	Eraldo Fico
14	...	Gruppo Patrioti della Maiella (Brigata Maiella)	Ettore Troilo
15	Romagna	8ª Brigata Garibaldi Romagna	
16	VI Zone (La Spezia)	Battaglione Val di Vara (Brigata Giustizia e Libertà)	Commander Daniele "Dany" Bucchioni
17	Trentino (Tesino and Valsugana)	Battaglione Gherlenda (Brigata Gramsci)	Commander Isidoro Giacomin "Fumo"

=== Notes about other formations ===
The Brigate Osoppo were coordinated for a period of 1944 by unified military command of division together with the Brigate Garibaldi while having the organizational autonomy. An example of this was during the government of the partisan Free Republic of Carnia.

== Partisan formations abroad ==
Partisan formations abroad were significant and were formed by militars of former divisions of the Royal Italian Army located outside the current national borders at 8 September 1943, in the Balkans. Soldiers decided voluntarily to reorganize themselves in order to avoid the imprisonment by Nazis and to collaborate with local groups. Among the formations, there were:

No.	Operative area	Formation
1	Kingdom of Yugoslavia	Divisione Italia
2	Italian occupation of Montenegro	Divisione italiana partigiana Garibaldi (Montenegro)
3	Kingdom of Yugoslavia	Italia Brigade
4	Italian protectorate of Albania	Antonio Gramsci Battalion

== See also ==
- National Liberation Committee
- Italian Resistance Movement
- ANPI

== Bibliography ==
- Battaglia, Roberto (1964). Storia della Resistenza Italiana (seconda edizione ed.). Turin: Einaudi.
- Oliva, Gianni (2002). Foibe: le stragi negate degli italiani della resistenza delle Venezia Giulia e dell'Istria. Milan: Arnoldo Mondadori Editore.
- Longo, Luigi (1947). Un popolo alla macchia. Milan: Mondadori.
- Secchia, Pietro; Frassati, Filippo (1962). La Resistenza e gli alleati. Milan: Feltrinelli.
- Secchia, Pietro (1971). Il Partito comunista italiano e la guerra di liberazione 1943-1945: ricordi, documenti inediti e testimonianze. Milan: Feltrinelli.
- Bianco, Dante Livio (1979). Le brigate Garibaldi nella Resistenza. Milan: Feltrinelli.
- Forni, Irnerio (1992). Alpini garibaldini: Ricordi di un medico nel Montenegro dopo l'8 settembre. Milan: Mursia.
- Il Veneto nella Resistenza, contributi per la storia di liberazione nel 50º anniversario della Costituzione. Venice: Associazione degli ex consiglieri della Regione Veneto. 1997.
- Sittoni, Giuseppe (2005). Uomini e fatti del Gherlenda. Strigno, Trento: Ed. Croxarie.
