= Carla Federica Nespolo =

Italian politician (1943–2020)

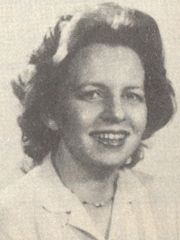

President of ANPI
- In office 3 November 2017 – 4 October 2020
- Preceded by: Carlo Smuraglia
- Succeeded by: Gianfranco Pagliarulo

Member of the Senate
- In office 11 July 1983 – 22 April 1992
- Constituency: Acqui Terme–Novi Ligure

Member of the Chamber of Deputies
- In office 5 July 1976 – 11 July 1983
- Constituency: Cuneo

Personal details
- Born: 4 March 1943 Novara, Italy
- Died: 4 October 2020 (aged 77) Alessandria, Italy
- Party: Italian Communist Party
- Occupation: Politician

Carla Federica Nespolo (4 March 1943 – 4 October 2020) was an Italian politician, President of National Association of Italian Partisans from 2017 until her death.

== Biography ==
Nespolo was born in Novara on 4 March 1943. After she graduated in philosophy, Nespolo joined the Italian Communist Party, becoming the first communist woman from Piedmont to be elected to the Italian Parliament.

She spent six years, from 1970 to 1976, in the provincial council of Alessandria, before getting elected to the Chamber of Deputies. She kept her seat in the Palazzo Montecitorio until 1983 when she was elected to the Senate. During her term in Parliament, Nespolo was rapporteur of the law for the reform of upper secondary school, member of the RAI Supervisory Committee and rapporteur for several proposals for the law on women's rights. She served on the special commission for the law of equality between men and women in work.

From 2011 to 2017, Nespolo was Vice President of the National Association of Italian Partisans under the guidance of Carlo Smuraglia.

In November 2017, Nespolo was elected President of the National Association of Italian Partisans, becoming the first woman to be elected president and the first who didn't take part in the Italian resistance movement, since she was too young.

Nespolo died on 4 October 2020, at the age of 77, after a long illness.

== Electoral history ==
Election	House	Constituency	Party	Votes	Result
1976	Chamber of Deputies	Cuneo–Alessandria–Asti	PCI	9,443	Elected
1979	Chamber of Deputies	Cuneo–Alessandria–Asti	PCI	10,395	Elected
1983	Senate of the Republic	Piedmont – Acqui Terme-Novi Ligure	PCI	36,341	Elected
1987	Senate of the Republic	Piedmont – Acqui Terme-Novi Ligure	PCI	32,777	Elected
