= Lucetti Battalion =

Italian Resistance unit

- Battaglione Lucetti
- Active: 1943–1945
- Type: Anarchist brigade of the Italian Resistance
- Engagements: Second World War, Italian Resistance

Commanders
- Commander: Ugo Mazzucchelli

The Lucetti Battalion (Italian: Batttaglione Lucetti) was an anarchist partisan brigade that operated in the surroundings of Carrara.

== Anarchist Resistance in Carrara ==
In Lunigiana and in the Carrara area, various libertarian formations operated with a total of about a thousand fighters: in addition to "Gino Lucetti" battalion there were the "Lucetti bis", the "Michele Schirru", the "Garibaldi Lunense", the "Elio Wochiecevich", the "Sap Renato Macchiarini" and the "Sap-Fai" groups.

This was in contrast to the situation in most parts of Italy, where despite autonomous anarchist formations existing in a not negligible number, the anarchists mostly merged into the Garibaldi assault brigades or in the formations of Justice and Freedom.

The history and social conditions of Carrara instead created the conditions for the presence of autonomous anarchist partisan formations to be the highest in all of Italy. In particular, since the beginning of the twentieth century with the development of the labor movement in the marble extraction and processing sector, Carrara can be considered the homeland of libertarian socialism; something that had a significant influence on the local anti-fascist movement.

== Formation of the Battalion ==
The Province of Massa and Carrara, as well as the neighboring provinces, was one of the main targets of the squadrist attacks of the early twenties and a sight of often clashes of the Formazioni Di Difesa Proletaria (transl. Proletarian Defense Formations) against the fascists. During the twenties the local fascists represented one of the most mobile militias of the fascist squads, and were involved in the attack on the Genoa Chamber of Labor, in the Events of Sarzana and the Events of Parma. However the anti-fascist movement of Carrara did not disappear despite the squadrist violence (often at the service of big marble industrialists).

After September 8, 1943, the German troops decided to disarm the Italian soldiers of the Dogali barracks in Carrara but several anarchists, led by Romualdo Del Papa, intervened and took possession of the weapons. This way, they managed to structure the first partisan brigades, such as the "Lucetti", which was initially established in the Lorano quarry and had Ugo Mazzucchelli as its commander. The battalion was named after Gino Lucetti, a native of Avenza, who in 1926 tried to kill Benito Mussolini with a hand grenade and was imprisoned for this.

== Influence in culture ==
The book Il coraggio del pettirosso (The courage of the robin) by Maurizio Maggiani talks about the Lucetti Battalion reporting some lines from the anarchist song "Dai monti di Sarzana" (also known as "Dai monti di Carrara") and asserting that no Nazi or Italian fascist ever managed to imprison and bring the partisans of the Battalion down and that only the carabinieri, after the Liberation, were able to dissolve them.

== See also ==
- Arditi del Popolo
- Green Guard - anarchist partisan unit active in Ukraine during WW2
- Syndicalist Brigade - anarchist partisan unit active in Poland during WW2
