= Alberto Meschi =

Italian anarchist (1879–1958)

- Born: 27 May 1879; Borgo San Donnino, Parma, Kingdom of Italy
- Died: 11 December 1958 (aged 79); Carrara, Tuscany, Republic of Italy
- Occupations: Bricklayer, writer
- Organization(s): Unione Sindacale Italiana, Antifascist Concentration, Italian League for Human Rights

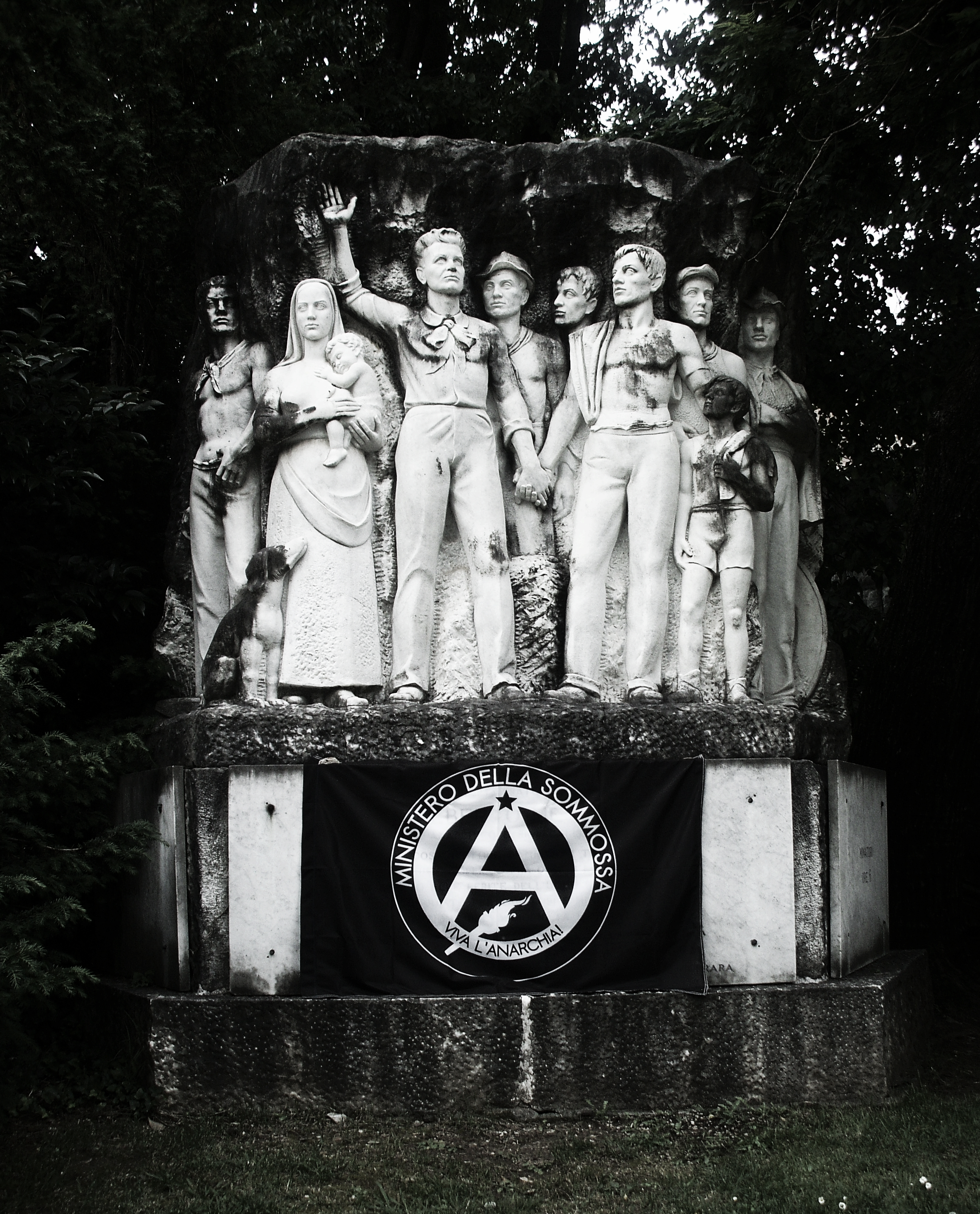
The Alberto Meschi monument in Carrara

Alberto Meschi was an Italian anarchist, trade union organizer, and anti-fascist fighter.

== See also ==
- Anarchism in Italy
