= Friedrich Engel (SS officer) =

SS officer (1909–2006)

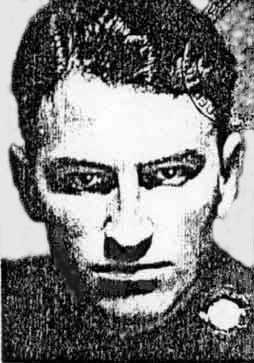
- Birth name: Friedrich Wilhelm Konrad Siegfried Engel
- Born: January 3, 1909; Warnau, Havelberg, Germany
- Died: February 4, 2006 (aged 97); Hamburg, Germany
- Allegiance: Germany
- Branch: Schutzstaffel (SS)

Friedrich Wilhelm Konrad Siegfried Engel (January 3, 1909 – February 4, 2006) was a German SS officer who was convicted in absentia of 246 murder charges by an Italian military court in 1999 for his role in the 1944 execution of Italian captives in retaliation for a partisan attack against German soldiers, which as a result earned him the nickname "Butcher of Genoa".

Subsequently brought before a German court in Hamburg in 2002, Engel was tried and likewise convicted on 59 counts of murder, being sentenced to seven years in prison, although because of his advanced age, he was given a stay of that ruling and was able to leave the court effectively a free man.

In 2004, Germany's highest court, the Bundesgerichtshof, overturned the previous ruling on the grounds that, despite acknowledging that Engel ordered the executions, the case of criminal murder had not been proven. The court would not permit a new trial to establish murder charges given the age and health state of the then 95-year-old Engel.

Prior to this, he had been investigated by German authorities in 1969, but no charges were laid and the case ended in 1970.

== Literature ==
- Münch I.: Geschichte vor Gericht. Der Fall Engel. Ellert & Richter Verlag, Hamburg 2004, ISBN 3-8319-0144-9. 175 S.
  - Frankfurter Allgemeine Zeitung, 20.08.2004.
- Il processo Engel : un percorso lungo i confini tra ricostruzione giudiziale e memoria storica / Associazione Memoria della Benedicta. Pier Paolo Rivello. Recco (Ge) : Mani, 2005. 191 p. ISBN 978-88-8012-327-9.
- Ernst Klee: Das Personenlexikon zum Dritten Reich. Wer war was vor und nach 1945. 2. Auflage. Fischer-Taschenbuch-Verlag, Frankfurt am Main 2007, S. 136. ISBN 978-3-596-16048-8.
- Case Nr.920: Eng., Friedrich Wilhelm Konrad Siegfried // Justiz und NS-Verbrechen, Vol. XLIX.
