= Arrigo Boldrini =

Italian politician (1915–2008)

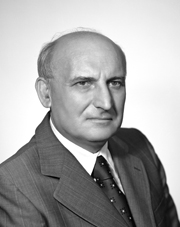

President of ANPI
- In office 9 December 1947 – 5 February 2006
- Preceded by: Office created
- Succeeded by: Agostino "Tino" Casali

Member of the Senate
- In office 5 July 1976 – 14 April 1994
- Constituency: Ravenna

Member of the Chamber of Deputies
- In office 8 May 1948 – 4 July 1976
- Constituency: Bologna

Member of the Constituent Assembly
- In office 25 June 1946 – 31 January 1948
- Constituency: Bologna

Personal details
- Born: 6 September 1915 Ravenna, Italy
- Died: 22 January 2008 (aged 92) Ravenna, Italy
- Party: PCI (1943–1991); PDS (1991–1998); DS (1998–2005)
- Occupation: Politician

Arrigo Boldrini (6 September 1915 – 22 January 2008) was an Italian politician and partisan, one of the most prominent figures of the Italian resistance movement, president of National Association of Italian Partisans for almost 60 years.

== Biography ==
=== During the Resistance ===
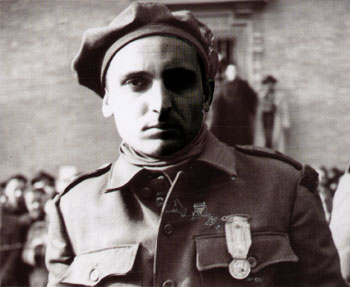
Arrigo Boldrini in the Resistance.

In 1943, Boldrini joined the then clandestine Italian Communist Party and has been one of the main promoters of the Resistance in Romagna. During the Resistance, Boldrini was the National Liberation Committee's reference man of Ravenna and leader of the 28th Garibaldi Brigade entitled to the partisan "Mario Gordini". During the Nazi-Fascist occupation, Boldrini was always at the forefront during the liberation missions in Romagna and was nicknamed Bulow, an homage to Prussian general Friedrich Wilhelm Freiherr von Bülow.

In 1945, some days immediately after the end of the war, his Brigade was still active in an area where had place a massacre of over 130 surrendered RSI soldiers and some former fascist civilians in Codevigo: in the last years he was indicated by revisionist researchers as the principal instigator of the crime, but in early post-war investigations Boldrini had already been acquitted of the same charges before trial, as it was demonstrated that the massacre was carried "... outside and against his orders and without his knowledge ...", and it's testified that he was elsewhere in the days of the massacre.

=== After the War ===
Boldrini has embodied the ethical and political motives behind the struggle of the Italian Resistance, becoming one of the most authoritative and credible representatives at the institutional level: after being elected to the Constituent Assembly, Boldrini became the first President of the National Association of Italian Partisans, holding this office from 1947 to 2006.

Boldrini was later elected to the Chamber of Deputies from 1948 to 1972 and to the Senate from 1972 to 1992, being a member of the Parliament uninterruptedly from 1948 to 1994.

In 1991, Boldrini joined the Democratic Party of the Left, and in 1998 he joined the Democrats of the Left until he decided to leave politics in 2005.

He died in his hometown Ravenna on 22 January 2008, at the age of 92.

== Electoral history ==
Election	House	Constituency	Party	Votes	Result
1946	Constituent Assembly	Bologna–Ferrara–Ravenna–Forlì	PCI	18,213	Elected
1948	Chamber of Deputies	Bologna–Ferrara–Ravenna–Forlì	PCI	43,850	Elected
1953	Chamber of Deputies	Bologna–Ferrara–Ravenna–Forlì	PCI	35,849	Elected
1958	Chamber of Deputies	Bologna–Ferrara–Ravenna–Forlì	PCI	32,218	Elected
1963	Chamber of Deputies	Bologna–Ferrara–Ravenna–Forlì	PCI	31,431	Elected
1968	Chamber of Deputies	Bologna–Ferrara–Ravenna–Forlì	PCI	62,842	Elected
1972	Chamber of Deputies	Bologna–Ferrara–Ravenna–Forlì	PCI	61,765	Elected
1976	Senate of the Republic	Emilia-Romagna–Ravenna	PCI	93,762	Elected
1979	Senate of the Republic	Emilia-Romagna–Ravenna	PCI	94,668	Elected
1983	Senate of the Republic	Emilia-Romagna–Ravenna	PCI	94,618	Elected
1987	Senate of the Republic	Emilia-Romagna–Ravenna	PCI	93,137	Elected
1992	Senate of the Republic	Emilia-Romagna–Ravenna	PDS	71,855	Elected
