= Warnau (Havelberg) =

Coordinates: 52.741°N 12.191°E

Population (31 December 2018)
  - Total: 233

Warnau is a town and part of the city of Havelberg in the Stendal district in Saxony-Anhalt.

== History ==
Warnau was first mentioned in the 13th century. The original Wendish settlement was west of today's Warnau, on the left of the road from Rehberg. Since these areas are often inundated by floods, the village was rebuilt on a hill. When exactly the relocation took place is not known, but it is presumed to be after the Thirty Years' War. The new settlement was built around the church, which stands at the highest point of the town.

In 1838 there was a major fire in which almost the entire village, including the church, was destroyed. The church was rebuilt in 1841. In the church there is an organ made by the organ builder Friedrich Hermann Lütkemüller from 1869.

Until 1950 Warnau belonged to the district of Jerichow II, then to the newly formed district of Havelberg, which in turn became part of the district of Stendal on 1 July 1994. In the period from 1 July 1950 to 14 October 1993, Garz was a district of Warnau and then became an independent municipality again. The municipality of Warnau belonged to the Elbe-Havel-Land administrative community. When it was incorporated into Havelberg on 1 January 2005, Warnau lost its political independence.

== Coat of arms ==
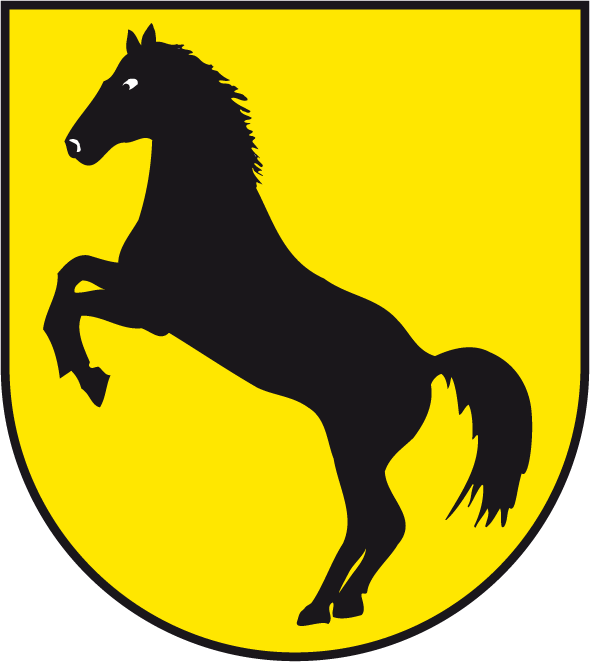
Coat of arms of the former municipality

The coat of arms of the former municipality was designed in 1996 by the Magdeburg municipal heraldist Jörg Mantzsch.

== Sports ==
SSV Havelwinkel Warnau currently plays (2019/2020 season) in the Landesliga Nord Sachsen-Anhalt (7th league). In the 2016/2017 season, the team created a novelty in Saxony-Anhalt football. The team was drawn from the then-third division 1. FC Magdeburg in the state cup. Since the Warnau sports field was too small for the expected influx of visitors, the traditional horse market was taking place in the neighboring Havelberg at the same time and the square in Stendal and others was out of the question for security reasons, the game was played in Rathenow, Brandenburg. It was the first time that a game of the State Cup Saxony-Anhalt took place outside the federal state. Warnau lost 8-0. Warnau also played in the cup against 1. FC Magdeburg in Rathenow in the 2019/2020 season and was eliminated after a 6-0 draw.
