= ANPI =

Italian veterans association of anti-fascist partisans

National Association of the Italian Partisans
- Abbreviation: ANPI
- Formation: 5 April 1945
- Type: Charitable foundation
- Purpose: Preserving and promoting the history and values of the Resistance and Constitution
- Headquarters: Rome, Italy
- Members: 110,000
- President: Gianfranco Pagliarulo
- Website: www.anpi.it

Associazione Nazionale Partigiani d'Italia (ANPI; lit. 'National Association Partisans of Italy') is an association founded by partisans and participants of the Italian Resistance against the Italian fascist regime and the subsequent Nazi occupation during World War II. ANPI was founded in Rome in 1944, as the war continued in northern Italy. It was constituted as a charitable foundation on 5 April 1945. It persists due to the activity of its anti-fascist members.

== History ==
The National Association of Italian Partisans was created by volunteers who took part in the war in the central regions of the Italian peninsula.

After the fall of the Italian Social Republic, the ANPI spread over the country as far as the southern tip of Italy. Most of the partisans who fought came from the center-north of Italy, but there were also members from Yugoslavia, Greece and France.

On 5 April 1945, the day that the ANPI was recognized as a charitable foundation, the association represented all the Italian partisans and was managed by a council reuniting the different brigades that fought in the war (Brigate Garibaldi, Ferruccio Parri’s Giustizia e libertà, Brigate Matteotti, Mazzini Society, independent groups and Catholic partisans groups), but after the first national congress, which took place in Rome in 1947, problems arose due to different visions of internal and foreign politics within the group.

=== List of ANPI National Congresses ===
1. Rome, 6–9 December 1947
2. Venice, 19–21 March 1949
3. Rome, 27–29 June 1952
4. Milan, 6–8 April 1956
5. Turin, 19–21 June 1959
6. Rome, 14–16 February 1964
7. Bologna, 18–21 March 1971
8. Florence, 4–7 November 1976
9. Genoa, 26–29 March 1981
10. Milan, 10–13 December 1986
11. Bologna, 2–5 June 1991
12. Naples, 28–30 June 1996
13. Abano Terme (PD), 29–31 March 2001
14. Chianciano Terme (SI), 24–26 February 2006
15. Turin, 24–27 March 2011
16. Rimini, 12–15 May 2016
17. Riccione, 24–27 March 2022

== Objectives ==
ANPI's objectives are the maintenance of the historical role of the partisan war by means of research and the collection of personal stories. Its goals are a continued defense against historical revisionism and the ideal and ethical support of the high values of freedom and democracy expressed in the 1948 constitution, in which the ideals of the Italian resistance were collected.

== Members ==
I am a member of ANPI because the resistance is not only part of the past but is still present in current times.

— ANPI's artists membership enrollment campaign, 2010

Unlike other veterans' associations, veterans can become ANPI members if they belong to one of the categories listed in Article 23 of its regulations. These include partisans, patriots, soldiers who fought against German soldiers after the Armistice between Italy and Allied armed forces, prisoners or deportees—during the civil war—for political activities or racial discrimination, imprisoned military persons who did not support the Italian Social Republic, and also all citizens who, without any distinction of age, declare themselves as antifascists, in accordance to ANPI regulations. With the introduction of a new regulation, approved during the 14th congress, in 2006, ANPI allowed a generational change in the direction of members of the association. In 2010 its membership count was about 110,000 affiliated members.

In addition to the 10% of members categorized as "historic partisans", 10% of the organization consists of young people between 18 and 30 years of age, and the majority of members (60–65%) are between 35 and 65 years old.

In the three years between 2006 and 2009, membership increased from 83,000 to 110,000, with a great number of young antifascists elected to high-ranking positions at the local and national level.

In June 2010, Dacia Maraini and Concita De Gregorio created a membership enrollment campaign that recruited many artists and intellectuals as testimonials. Among them were Marco Bellocchio, Andrea Camilleri, Massimo Carlotto, Liliana Cavani, Roberto Citran, Cristina e Francesca Comencini, Vincenzo Consolo, Simone Cristicchi, Serena Dandini, Emma Dante, Giancarlo De Cataldo, Ellekappa, Sabrina Ferilli, Dario Fo, Matteo Garrone, Fabrizio Gifuni, Giorgia, Irene Grandi, Ugo Gregoretti, Monica Guerritore, Margherita Hack, Fiorella Mannoia, Simona Marchini, Neri Marcorè, Mario Monicelli, Giuliano Montaldo, Claudia Mori, Nicky Nicolai, Moni Ovadia, Marco Paolini, Michele Placido, Gigi Proietti, Franca Rame, Lidia Ravera, Toni Servillo, Paolo Sorrentino, Sergio Staino, Roberta Torre, Nadia Urbinati, Vauro, Lucio Villari, and Gustavo Zagrebelsky.

== Structure ==
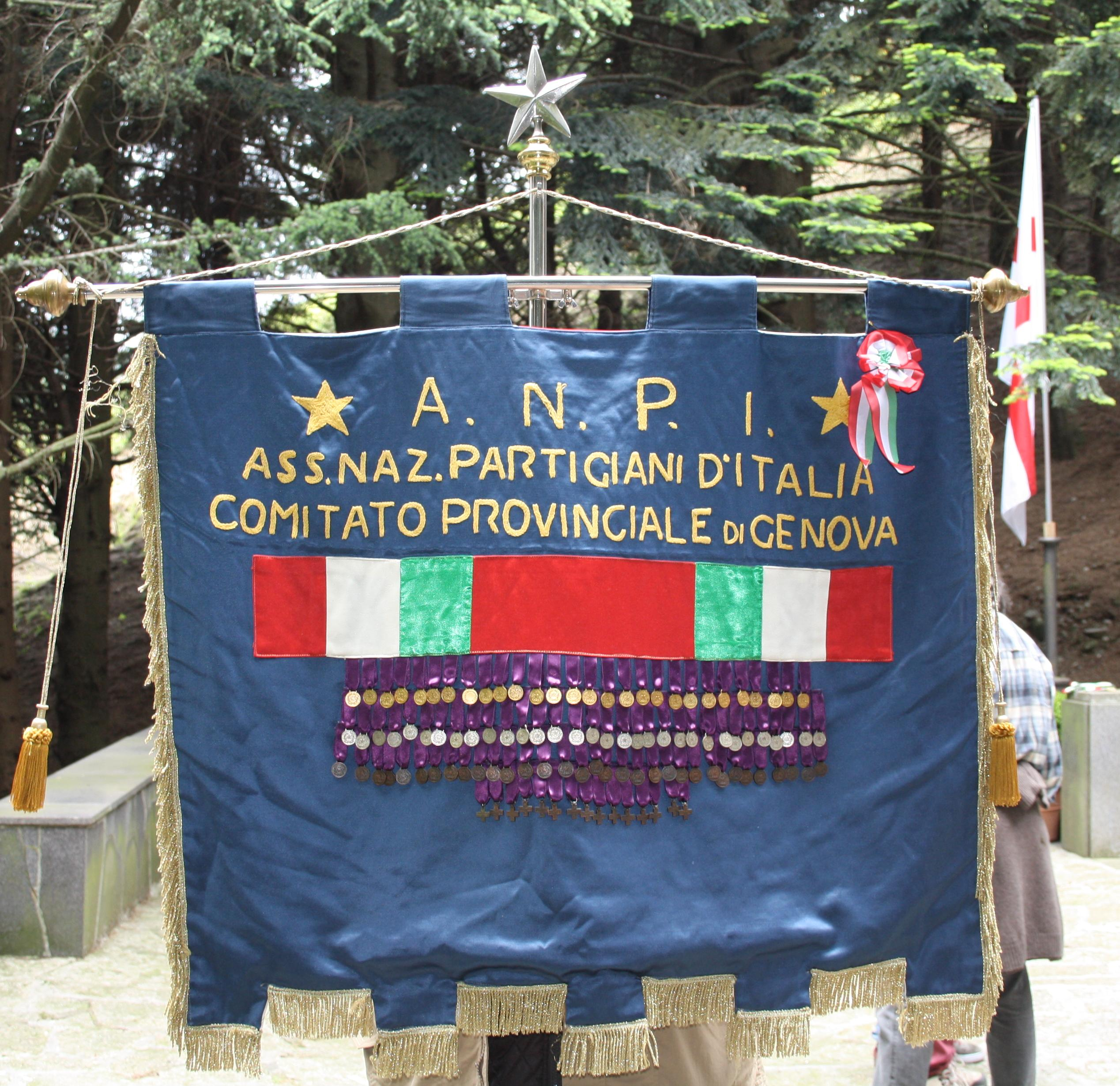
Standard of the ANPI Committee of the Province of Genoa

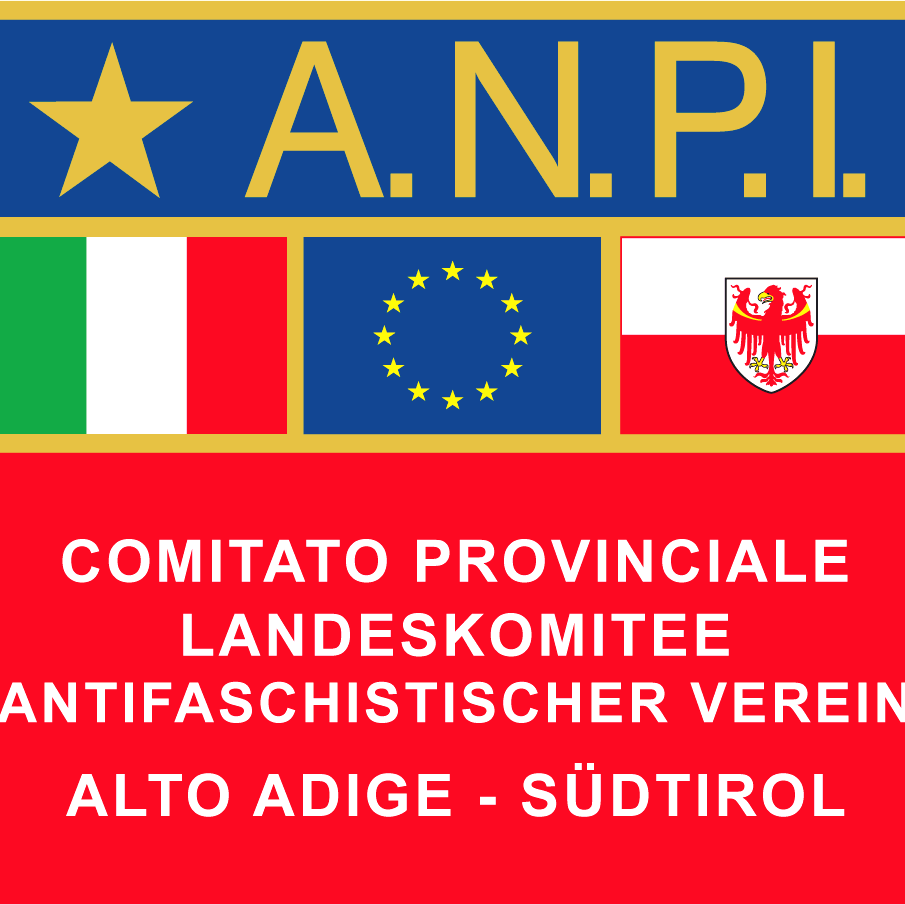
Bilingual standard of the South Tyrolean ANPI Committee

The association is currently structured with local groups, district groups, council groups, and provincial and regional committees. The association's headquarters are at Via degli Scipioni 271, Rome.

Arrigo Boldrini was the ANPI president from the first congress (1947) until 2006. Until June 2009 Tino Casali was the honorary president, Raimondo Ricci was the national president and Armando Cossutta was the vice-president.

In April 2011 the national committee of the ANPI elected new leadership. Carlo Smuraglia, partisan fighter, lawyer, senator, and labor-rights professor was elected to be the new national president. The following vice-presidents were also elected: Armando Cossutta, Luciano Guerzoni, Giovanna Stanka Hrovatin, Lino "William" Michelini, Carla Nespolo, Marisa Ombra, Alessandro Pollio Salimbeni, and Massimo Rendina. National secretaries include: Carlo Smuraglia (Presidente), Luciano Guerzoni, Marisa Ferro, Marisa Ombra, Carla Argenton, Andrea Liparoto, and Paolo Papotti.

In May 2016 the national committee confirmed the presidency of Carlo Smuraglia, electing Luciano Guerzoni, Carla Nespolo, Marisa Ombra, Alessandro Pollio Salimbeni as vice-presidents.

In 2017, following an announcement by Smuraglia, Carla Nespolo was elected to the office of national president, the first woman to be elected to the position and also the first president not to have participated in the original partisan struggle in WWII. Smuraglia was conferred the title president emeritus.

On June 28, 2025, on the eightieth anniversary of the liberation of Italy and the election of the first President of the Italian Republic, Enrico De Nicola, the only ANPI section located outside Europe was founded in Montreal, at the headquarters of the historic Quebec union CSN.

=== National Presidents of the A.N.P.I. ===
- Arrigo Boldrini (9 December 1947 – 5 February 2006)
- Agostino "Tino" Casali (5 February 2006 – 17 June 2009)
- Raimondo Ricci (17 June 2009 – 16 April 2011)
- Carlo Smuraglia (16 April 2011 – 3 November 2017)
- Carla Federica Nespolo (3 November 2017 – 4 October 2020)
- Gianfranco Pagliarulo (since 30 October 2020)

=== Patria Indipendente ===
ANPI publishes a magazine called Patria Indipendente (Independent Nation). Since 2015 it is only published digitally. The magazine focuses on historical-political issues, noting events related to the Italian resistance and promoting the respect of Constitutional themes.

== ANPI national festival ==
Since 2008, ANPI organizes its national festival. During the event, meetings, debates, and musical concerts that focus on antifascism, peace, and democracy are organized.

=== Editions ===
Year	Title	Date	Location
2008	ANPI resistance. Democracy and antifascism	20 June to 22 June	Gattatico (RE), Museo Cervi
2010	Italians, by Constitution	24 June to 27 June	Ancona, Mole Vanvitelliana
2012	The memory beats in the heart of the future	14 June to 17 June	Marzabotto (BO)
2015	I dream of a country that is free and democratic	30 May to 2 June	Carpi (MO)
2024	Let's do the Constitution	27 June to 30 June	Bologna

== See also ==
- Armistice of Cassibile
- Francesco Fausto Nitti, former ANPI official
- International Brigades
- Brigate Garibaldi
- Giustizia e Libertà
- Brigate Osoppo
- Italian partisan brigades
- CLN, National Liberation Committee
- 1946 Italian institutional referendum
- Giacomo Matteotti
- Ferruccio Parri
- Sandro Pertini
- Giorgio Amendola
- Luigi Longo
- Giancarlo Pajetta
- Giorgio Bocca
- Beppe Fenoglio
- Nilde Jotti
- Tina Anselmi
- Ada Gobetti
- Italo Calvino
- Cervi Brothers
- Leone Ginzburg
- Vittorio Foa
- Tullio Vecchietti
- Natalia Ginzburg
- Anna Maria Princigalli
- Gianni Rodari
- Italo Calvino
- Giuseppe Saragat
- Giorgio Bocca
- Irma Bandiera
- Carlo Lizzani
- Oriana Fallaci
- Tommaso Fiore
- Benigno Zaccagnini
- Enrico Mattei
- Giuseppe Di Vittorio
- Alfredo Reichlin
- Emilio Lussu
- Vittoria Nenni
- Enrico Martini
- Piero Balbo
- Marzabotto Massacre
- Sant'Anna di Stazzema
- Fosse Ardeatine
- The Holocaust in Italy
- Risiera di San Sabba
