= Irma Bandiera =

Italian partisan

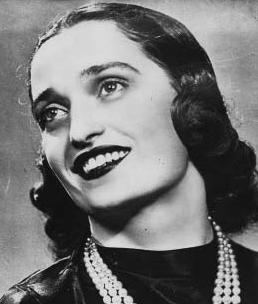

Irma Bandiera (1915–1944) was a member of the seventh Gruppo di azione patriottica. In 1944 she was captured, blinded, and killed. Enrico Berlinguer, of the Italian Communist Party, held her in high esteem. A street in her native Bologna is named for her and the song Mimma e Balella relates to her.

== Biography ==
Bandiera was born in 1915 to a well-off Bolognese family. Her father, Angelo, was in construction and became anti-fascist during the dictatorship. Her mother was Argentina Manferrati, and she had a sister, Nastia.

Following the armistice, Bandiera's boyfriend, a soldier, was taken prisoner by the Germans in Crete after 8 September 1943, and was lost at sea after the ship he was on was bombed and sunk off the port of Piraeus.

Bandiera began to help demobilised Italian soldiers after the armistice and took an interest in politics, joining the Communist Party. In the village of Funo, where she would visit relatives, she met a medical student, Dino Cipollani from Argelato, the partisan "Marco". Irma joined the Resistance, at the time very active in the Bolognese plain, with the name of battle "Mimma" in the VII GAP brigade, Gianni Garibaldi of Bologna. On 5 August 1944 the partisans killed a German officer and a commander of the SS, which triggered a reprisal the next day in Funo. Three partisans were arrested and imprisoned.

On 7 August 1944, Bandiera was carrying weapons to her group's base in Castel Maggiore. In the evening she was arrested at her uncle's house, along with two other partisans. They were locked up in the schools of San Giorgio, but she was separated from her companions. She was then transferred to Bologna, where her captors hoped to obtain further information about the Resistance from her.

While her family was looking for her in prisons and barracks, Bandiera was tortured for a week by the fascists of the Special Autonomous Company, led by Captain Renato Tartarotti, who blinded her, but Irma resisted without speaking, thus saving her fellow partisans. According to Renata Viganò, "the most ignominious defeat of their bloody profession was called Irma Bandiera". Finally, the Fascists shot her point-blank at the Meloncello di Bologna, near her parents' house, on 14 August.

On 14 August Bandiera's body was found on the pavement near a factory, where her torturers had left her in open display for a whole day as a warning. Her body was then taken to the Institute of Forensic Medicine in Via Irnerio where a guardian, a friend of the Resistance, took pictures of her face devastated by torture. Bandiera was finally buried in the cemetery of the Certosa di Bologna, in the company of family and some friends.

The Bolognese federation of the Italian Communist Party on 4 September 1944 circulated a clandestine paper in which they recalled the patriotic sense of Bandiera's sacrifice, calling on people to intensify the partisan struggle for liberation from Nazism and fascism.

In her honour, in the summer of 1944, a group of partisans operating in Bologna took the name of the First Garibaldi Brigade "Irma Bandiera". A SAP brigade (Patriotic Action Team) operating in the northern suburbs of Bologna was also named after her, as well as a Women's Defense Group.

== Honours and memory ==
Gold Medal of Military Valour

At the end of the war, Bandiera was decorated posthumously with the Gold Medal of Military Valor, along with 18 other women partisans. The justification mentions how

"First among the Bolognese women to hold arms for the fight in the name of freedom, she always fought with a lion's courage. Captured in combat by the German SS, subjected to fierce torture, she did not say a word that could compromise her comrades. After being blinded she was barbarously slaughtered and her body left on the public street. Pure heroine, worthy of the virtues of Italian women, she was the beacon of all the patriots of Bologna in the war of Liberation".

Bandiera is remembered in the Shrine of Piazza Nettuno and in the Monument to the Partisan Falls in Villa Spada. Streets are named after her in the municipalities of Bologna, Argelato, Castel Maggiore, Castelnovo di Sotto, Cattolica, Copparo, Crevalcore, Granarolo dell'Emilia, Malalbergo, Molinella, Pieve di Cento, Sant'Ilario d'Enza, San Giorgio di Piano in Emilia-Romagna, as well as Rovigo, Terni, Civitavecchia, Ribera (in the province of Agrigento), Gonnesa, Sant'Arpino (in the province of Caserta) and Valenza (in the province of Alessandria). A large housing complex also bears her name in Frattamaggiore.

In Bologna, a road named after Bandiera begins at the Arco del Meloncello, the place where she was murdered. There is a memorial plaque there to her memory:

Irma Bandiera
National heroine
1915 - 1944
Your ideals were able to overcome torture and death
Freedom and youth you offered
For life and the redemption of the people and of Italy
Only the immense pride attenuates the fierce pain
Of the comrades of struggle
So many who knew you and loved you
In the place of your sacrifice
For perennial memory
Put

On the occasion of the 72nd anniversary of the Liberation, Bologna paid tribute to Bandiera in the neighbourhood where she was born and where she was later killed. The association CHEAP Street Poster Art and the duo of street artists of Orticanoodles (pseudonym of duo of Italian artists composed of Wally (born in Carrara) and Alita (born in Milan), chose for this the facade of the Bombicci, the school that claims a "democratic and anti-fascist vocation" purpose, and also to express how Bandiera was a national heroine and also daughter of the same district. A large mural was created using the pouncing technique, reproducing her smiling face as she was immortalized in one of her most famous photographs.
