= Gino Lucetti =

Italian anarchist and anti-fascist (1900–1943)

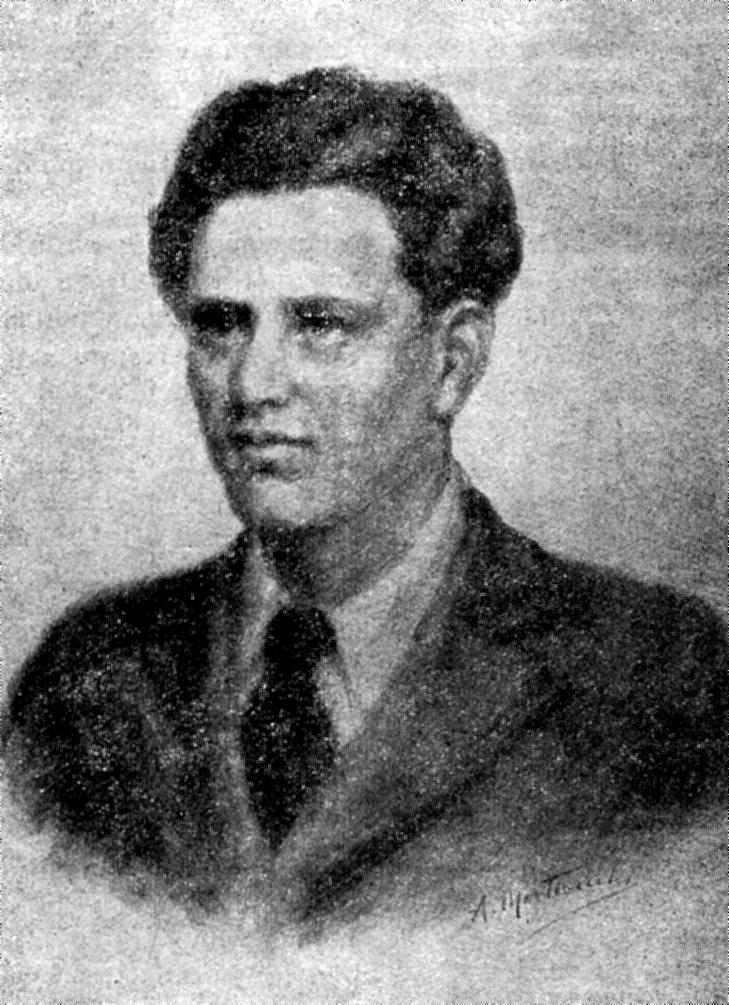
- Born: 31 August 1900; Carrara, Italy
- Died: 17 September 1943 (aged 43); Ischia, Italy
- Cause of death: Air raid
- Known for: Assassination attempt on Mussolini
- Movement: Anarchism, anti-fascism

Gino Lucetti (31 August 1900 – 17 September 1943) was an Italian anarchist and anti-fascist who attempted to assassinate the Italian fascist dictator Benito Mussolini in 1926.

After World War I, Lucetti was involved in many clashes and political brawls during the Biennio Rosso. He continued to oppose local fascists and on 26 September 1925, after an argument, he wounded with a pistol the fascist militant and fellow citizen Alessandro Perfetti. His companion, Antonio Vatteroni, fired back, wounding Lucetti in his neck and ear as he fled. In spite of the wound, he escaped and embarked on a ship to Marseille. He came back to Italy under the name of Ermete Giovannini, with the intention of attacking Mussolini's life, following a plan that he claimed to have developed alone.

On 11 September 1926, the day of the trial for the shooting of the previous year, in front of Porta Pia in Rome, Lucetti launched a bomb against the Lancia Lambda of Mussolini on the usual route from Villa Torlonia, his house, to his office in Palazzo Chigi. The bomb exploded on the ground, slightly injuring eight people but leaving the target unharmed. When arrested by the police he said, "I didn't come with a bouquet of flowers for Mussolini. But I was also willing to use the revolver if I didn't achieve my aim with the bomb." He was sentenced to 30 years in prison but he was freed or escaped in 1943 when Napoli was liberated. On 17 September 1943, he died in the island of Ischia due to an air bombardment from the Germans.

The anarchist brigade Lucetti Battalion of the Italian Resistance during World War II was named after him.
