= Pio Turroni =

Italian anarchist (1906–1982)

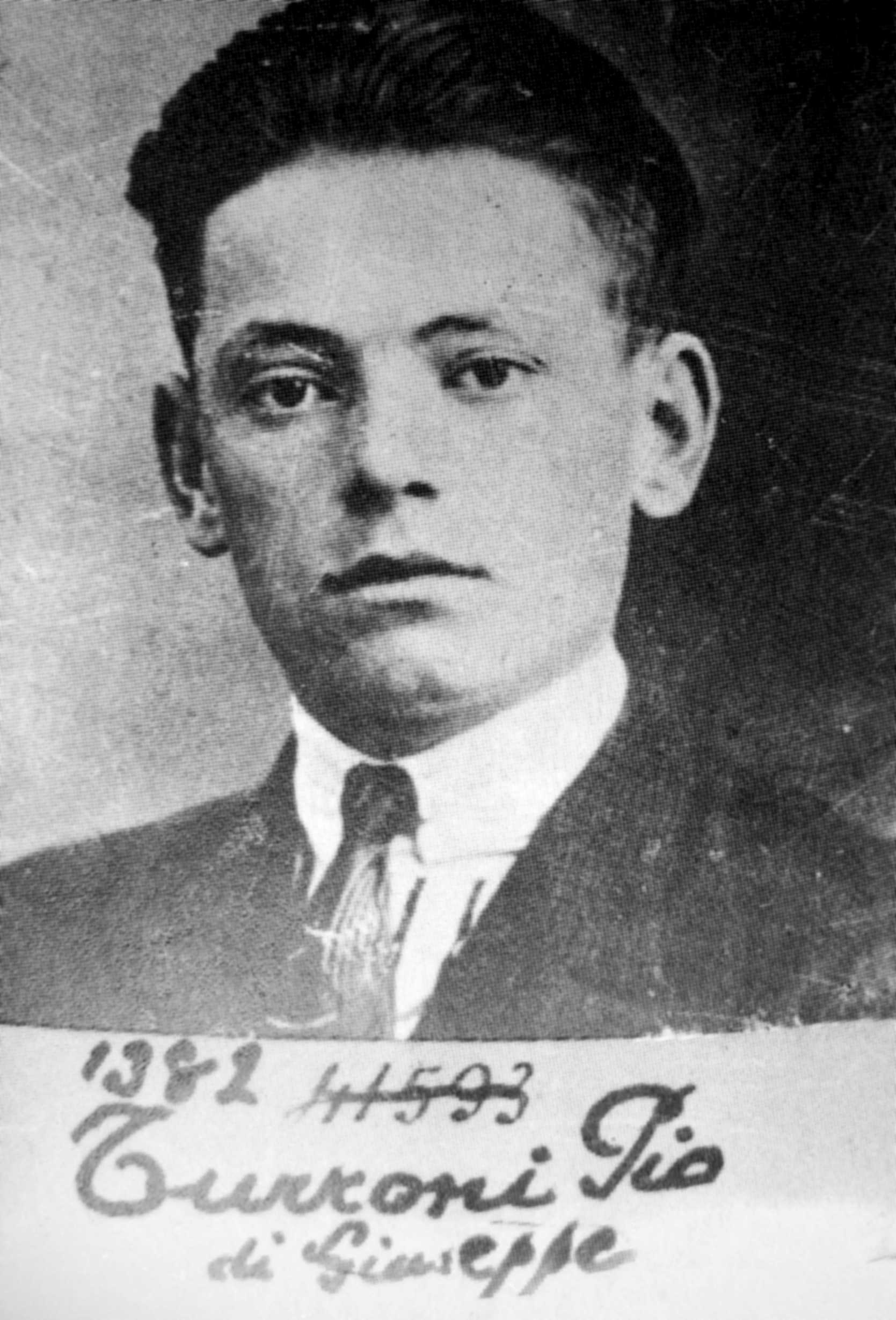
Pio Turroni

Pio Turroni (30 May 1906 – 7 April 1982) was an Italian anarchist and editor of anarchist publications. He fought for the Republican side in the Spanish Civil War as a member of the Confederal militias.

== Life ==
=== Family provenance ===
Pio Turroni was born into a working-class family at Cesena, a mid-sized city to the southeast of Bologna along the road towards Rimini, in Romagna. He was the fourth recorded son of Giuseppe Turroni by his marriage with Virginia Magnani. The family was highly politicized. His brother, Mauro (born 1891) was a socialist while Luigi Egisto (born 1893) and Urbano (known as Adolfo and born 1900) were committed republicans.

=== Between two world wars ===
In 1920 Turroni took part in an Errico Malatesta rally in Cesena. During the post war years Europe underwent intensified political polarization, and by 1923 Pio Turroni, now aged 16, was already listed in police files as a "subversive" or "anarchist". In 1923, in the course of violent clashes with fascist gangs that accompanied a general strike, two of his brothers were seriously wounded by gunfire: one lost a leg. Pio himself was repeatedly beaten up. In October 1923, holding valid passports, the three brothers Luigi Egisto, Urbano and Pio Turroni emigrated to Belgium, where they probably settled in or near Liège. Details are sparse, but it is thought he remained in Belgium for approximately two years, working in the construction sector and continuing to pursue his political agenda of social activism.

He then moved to France, arriving in Paris probably towards the end of 1926. A Fascist government under Benito Mussolini had been appointed in Italy in 1922, and by 1926 Paris was becoming a focus for Italian political exiles: in Paris Turroni participated actively in Italian antifascist activism. Unable to find work in the French capital, he moved to Normandy in the west, but at the end of 1928 he was able to return to Paris. He was one of those who campaigned energetically (though ultimately unsuccessfully) to prevent the execution in the United States of Sacco and Vanzetti. It was while campaigning to prevent the execution of Sacco and Vanzetti that Turroni first met the Ukrainian anarchist, Nestor Makhno (1888–1934).

During the later 1920s Turroni also became increasingly active as a propagandist, writing under the pseudonym "Camillo da Lodi" for various regionally produced libertarian publications in Italy such as Umanità Nova, Pensiero e Volontà, L'avvenire anarchico, Non mollare and Volontà. Between 1933 and 1935 his principal activity involved editing and publishing "Agitprop" material for the Edizioni libertarie group, based at Brest in the extreme northwest of France. Particularly significant contributions included an article entitled Reflections on war by Simone Weil and one entitled L'Operaiolatrìa by Camillo Berneri.

In March 1933 Pio Turroni's name was placed on a list of wanted men in connection with a detention order issued by the prefecture in Forlì back home in Italy, and it may be partly for this reason that his precise whereabouts within becomes increasingly hard to track in the sources, but there are records of his presence in towns and cities including Brest, Bordeaux, Marseille and Vichy. Between 1932 and November 1935 he was informally married to Nara Cremonini, daughter of another anarchist exile, Bernardo Cremonini. Although Cremonini was treated as an exiled anarchist and an opponent of fascism, it later transpired that since 1927 he had worked as an agent provocateur and spy on behalf of the Italian fascist secret police, and Turroni would later hold Cremonini culpable for the extent to which the Italian authorities often seemed disconcertingly well briefed about his activities and whereabouts.

Directly after the Spanish Coup d'état led by the fascists under Francisco Franco, in October 1936 Turrano volunteered for service in the Spanish Civil War, becoming a militiaman in the platoon headed up by Francisco Ascaso, which following Ascaso's death, became the Rosselli platoon. In March 1937 he was badly wounded in fighting at Belchite. Shortly after this he was one of those, together with Attilio Bulzamini, who came up with a plan for an attempt on the life of Mussolini during the first week in August, while the dictator was in holiday with his family in Riccione. Turreni moved from Barcelona to Marseille to wait for the necessary "materials", but there were delays and nothing came of the plan in 1937. Following Bulzamini's death, there are suggestions that Turroni revived the project in 1938. Details remain unclear, but Mussolini was not assassinated and Turroni returned to France. The Italian authorities evidently knew more about Turroni's movements than he anticipated, and on 3 September 1939 he was arrested in Marseille at the request of the Italian government and placed in the military prison of Fort Saint-Nicolas by the entrance to the Old Port of Marseille. According to official reports he was accused of espionage on behalf of a foreign power and of holding significant sums of money for which he could not account.

=== War years ===
War was declared between France and Germany in September 1939, although at this stage Italy remained formally neutral. On 16 March 1940 a judge announced that Turroni's case would not proceed to trial: he was served with a deportation order, despite which he was released from the Marseille military prison two days later, on 18 March 1940. Italy invaded France towards the end of June 1940. On 8 July, without any obvious reason, the police arrested Turroni in Vichy. At about this time a collaborationist government was being established in the town to administer the southern half of France, but it is not apparent whether either Turroni's presence in the town or his arrest were in any way connected with these developments. He was imprisoned at Saint-Pierre till 29 July 1940, when he was transferred to the internment camp at Villemagne (Gard). It was probably at the end of August that he was moved again, this time to the collection camp for foreigners (Centre de rassemblement des étrangers) at Remoulins. On 22 October 1940 he was moved to the Le Vernet concentration camp. Four days later, however, on 26 October 1940, he managed to escape, apparently in the course of another transfer.

Turroni spent the next few years attempting to evade recapture: precise timelines are not all easy to discern. On 15 or 16 December 1940, with fellow anarchist fugitive Aldo Garosci, he attempted to embark for Morocco, but was arrested. He escaped the next day and was rearrested on 18 December 1940 and detained till 9 January 1941: he was accused of escaping. Having evidently escaped again, he made another attempt to reach North Africa, this time accompanied by Leo Valiani and ten other members of the Giustizia e Libertà resistance movement. The attempt succeeded: the anarchists arrived in Algeria at the end of January 1941 and crossed the frontier into Morocco at Oujda. Arriving in Casablanca they found many more Italian anarchist exiles. For ten months he supported himself working clandestinely in the construction trade.

Pio Turroni's preferred destination turned out not to be Morocco, but Mexico, however. On 20 November 1941, after several months of waiting at Casablanca, and armed with a false (or "recycled") passport, he embarked for Veracruz on board the Serpa Pinto, a Portuguese cargo boat converted for passenger use. His fellow passengers included political refugees mainly from Spain, but also Jews and political dissidents from Germany and the countries it had conquered. There were, in addition, 14 Italian antifascists. Most of these Italians were bound not for Mexico but for New York. The boat had been chartered by the Geneva-based Red Cross, and the fares of the Italians had been paid for by a committee of fellow anti-fascists based in New York, who had also pledged to pay for return trips of the escapees once the war was over. Cabins were expensive and there were only a hundred of them: most of the approximately 1,200 passengers slept in a large improvised dormitory below the ship's bridge. Not all of the passengers were in good health. One of them, Giale Franchini, the son-in-law of the Italian politician Cipriano Facchinetti, suffered with travel sickness and ate only oranges and lemons for the first week of the voyage, which Turroni was able to get hold of for him. Three of the passengers died during the voyage.

As part of the Italian community of regime opponents exiled in Mexico, Turroni pursued his political agenda energetically, while supporting himself with work as a bricklayer. However, in June 1943, possibly anticipating the fall of Mussolini and Italy's de facto withdrawal from the German alliance during the ensuing months, he decided the time had come to return home, embarking on board a Swedish ship sailing via Halifax in Canada and Liverpool in England to London. However, progress was interrupted when the ship docked at Liverpool: Turroni and another victim of fascism, Giuseppe "Beppe" Petacchi, with whom he had been travelling, were arrested and placed in a concentration camp near London. One source attributes the actions of the English authorities to a clerical error. It was only after they had been interned with "real" Italian fascists, and become involved in endless politically driven skirmishes with these, that the English authorities determined that Turroni was a "genuine" antifascist.

During the final months of 1943 he arrived in Naples. Together with Giovanna Berneri, the widow of Camillo Berneri, and others including Cesare Zaccaria and Armido Abbate, he established the Alliance of Libertarian Groups and Revolutionary Libertarians (Alleanza dei Gruppi Libertari e Rivoluzione libertaria). He became editor of Volontà, an anarchist newspaper.

=== After a second world war ===
After the war ended, in 1950 Turroni became the editor of L'Aurora in Forlì, back in his home region. With Gigi Damiani he founded the fortnightly L'Antistato, also based in Forlì, and to which the two of them were the principal contributors, working closely together for several years. In 1951 his journalistic work led him into court when he was accused of "insulting the judiciary" ("vilipendio alla magistratura"). Further trials followed, including one in Bologna in 1959 in which he was charged with producing "anti-electoral propaganda" ("propaganda antielettorale"). (In Genoa Aurelio Chessa faced similar charges at this time.)

Turroni was a delegate at the founding postwar conference of the Italian Anarchist Federation at Carrara in 1945. However, he became critical of several aspects of the federation and at the ninth conference, again at Carrara, in 1965 he was one of those "individualist" anarchists who broke away, forming the "Anarchist Initiative Groups" (Gruppi di iniziativa anarchica / GIA).
