= Rensi =

Rensi may refer to:

- Ed Rensi (born 1944), American businessman, CEO of McDonald's from 1991 to 1997
- Giuseppe Rensi, Italian 20th-century philosopher (father of Emilia)
- Emilia Rensi, Italian 20th-century philosopher (daughter of Giuseppe)
- Team Rensi Motorsports, a NASCAR team
