= Anarchism in Cuba =

Anarchism as a social movement in Cuba held great influence with the working classes during the 19th and early 20th century. The movement was particularly strong following the abolition of slavery in 1886, until it was repressed first in 1925 by President Gerardo Machado, and more thoroughly by Fidel Castro's Marxist–Leninist government following the Cuban Revolution in the late 1950s. Cuban anarchism mainly took the form of anarcho-collectivism based on the works of Mikhail Bakunin and, later, anarcho-syndicalism. The Latin American labor movement, and by extension the Cuban labor movement, was at first more influenced by anarchism than Marxism.

== History ==
=== Colonial era ===
In the mid-19th century, Cuban society was highly stratified, consisting of a Spanish creole ruling class of tobacco, sugar, and coffee plantation owners, a middle class of black and Spanish plantation workers, and an underclass of black slaves. The upper echelons of society were also deeply divided between the creoles and Spaniards (known as peninsulares), with the Spaniards benefiting greatly from the colonial regime. Cuba was a colony of Spain, although there were movements for independence, integration into the U.S., and integration with Spain. The roots of anarchism were first seen in 1857, when a Proudhonian mutualist society was founded. After being introduced to the ideas of Pierre-Joseph Proudhon by José de Jesus Márquez, Saturnino Martínez (an Asturian immigrant to Cuba) founded the periodical La Aurora in 1865. Directed at tobacco workers, it included the earliest advocation of cooperative societies in Cuba. By the Ten Years' War, the insurgents against Spain included expatriates from the Paris Commune, and others influenced by Proudhon, including Salvador Cisneros Betancourt and Vicente García.

==== Early development of the movement ====
By the 1880s, the first explicitly anarchist influence had manifested when José C. Campos established links between Cuba and Spanish anarchists operating in Barcelona by importing anarchist pamphlets and newspapers. At the same time, many Spanish anarchists emigrated to Cuba, and it became very common for workers to read anarchist literature aloud in the tobacco factories, thereby greatly helping the dissemination of anarchist ideas amongst the workers. During the 1880s, and up through the early 1890s, Cuban anarchists favored an anarcho-collectivist method of organizing and action similar to that of Spain's Federación de Trabajadores de la Región Española (Workers' Federation of the Spanish Region, FTRE), following an "each to his contribution" line, as opposed to the "each to his need" line of the anarcho-communists.

Enrique Roig San Martín founded the Centro de Instrucción y Recreo de Santiago de Las Vegas in 1882, to advocate the organization of labor and distribute literature from anarcho-collectivists in Spain. The Centro had a strict policy accepting all Cubans, "regardless of their social position, political tendency, and differences of color." The same year, the Junta Central de Artesanos (Central Group of Artisans) was founded following Roig San Martín's statement that "no guild or working class organization should be tied to the feet of capital". Roig San Martín wrote for El Boletín del Gremio de Obreros, and for the first explicitly anarchist periodical in Cuba, El Obrero, which was founded in 1883 by republican-democrats but quickly turned into a mouthpiece for anarchists when Roig San Martín took over as editor. He then founded El Productor in 1887. In addition to San Martín, El Productor had writers in the Cuban cities of Santiago de Las Vegas and Guanabacoa, and the cities of Tampa and Key West in Florida, and published reprinted articles from the French-language Le Revolté and Barcelona's La Acracia.

Founded in 1885, the Círculo de Trabajadores organization concentrated on educational and cultural activities, hosting a secular school for 500 poor students and meetings for workers' groups. The next year, leaders of the Círculo (with Enrique Creci at the head) formed an aid committee to raise funds for the legal troubles of eight Chicago anarchists who had been charged with murder in connection with the Haymarket affair. Within a month and a half, the committee had raised approximately US$1,500 for the cause. In addition, a few days prior to the anarchists executions, the Círculo organized a demonstration of 2,000 people in Havana to protest the state's decision to execute the Americans. The Círculo and El Productor were both fined - the paper for an editorial written by Roig San Martín about the executions, and the Círculo for displaying a painting that commemorated the execution. The colonial government also prohibited the demonstrations that would be held every year on anniversary of the execution.

==== Strengthening organization and action ====
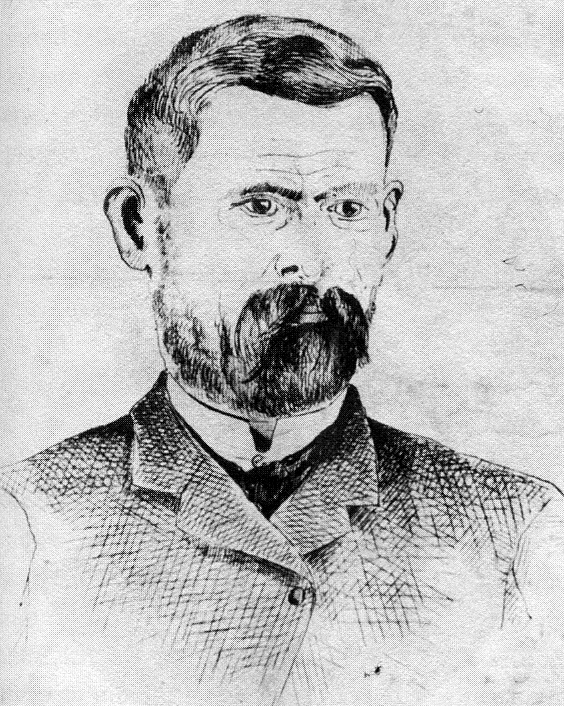
Enrique Roig San Martín.

The first explicitly anarchist organization, the Alianza Obrera (Workers' Alliance), was founded in 1887. This organization participated along with the Federacíon de Trabajadores de la Habana (Havana Workers' Federation) and El Productor in the first Congreso Obrero de Cuba (Cuban Workers' Congress), which took place on October 1, 1887. The congress was mostly attended by tobacco workers, though not exclusively. It issued a "dictum" encompassing six points: opposition to all vestiges of authority, unity among workers' organizations through a federative pact, complete freedom of action among all groups, mutual cooperation, solidarity among all groups, and the prohibition within the federation of all political and religious doctrines. Satunino Martínez looked disapprovingly on the outcome of the congress, favoring more reformist ideas of organizing. This led to a rivalry between him and Roig San Martín and the splitting of the unions into two camps.

Soon after the congress, tobacco workers initiated a series of strikes at three factories, one of which lasted through to the end of November. Later, in the summer of 1888, strikes by tobacco workers led to a lockout by factory owners in more than 100 factories. The Círculo de Trabajadores organized a collection drive to support the locked out workers, going so far as to send representatives to Key West, Florida to solicit donations from American tobacco workers. By October, the lockout was ended by factory owners agreeing to meet with workers in negotiations. The outcome of this situation was so favorable to the Alianza Obrera that the union saw its membership jump from 3,000 to 5,000 in the subsequent six months, making it the most powerful union in Cuba. The following year, Roig San Martín died at age 46, just days after his release from jail by the Spanish colonial government; his funeral was reportedly attended by 10,000 mourners. Just a few months later, in response to a lockout/strike in the tobacco industry, the colonial head Manuel Salamanca y Negrete closed the manufacturer's union, the Alianza Obrera and the Círculo de Trabajadores, although the four schools maintained by the Círculo were allowed to remain open, and the Círculo as a whole was allowed to reopen the following year by the new administration.

==== Government response and the War of Independence ====
Cover of El Productor commemorating the Haymarket martyrs

The first May Day demonstration in Cuba was held in 1890, and consisted of a march followed by a meeting addressed by 18 anarchist speakers. In the following days, strikes by workers in many industries caused the colonial government to close the Círculo de Trabajadores again, only to rescind the decision when faced with a manifesto issued in protest by 2,300 workers. Later that year, 11 anarchists were tried for the murder of Menéndez Areces, a director of the moderate Uníon Obrera (Workers' Union). Though all 11 were found innocent, Captain-General Camilo García de Polavieja used the situation as pretext for shutting down production of El Productor, and repression of anarchists in general. In 1892, another labor congress was held in which it reconfirmed its revolutionary syndicalist principles and expressing solidarity with the women in the working class (a new idea for a predominantly male working class that felt competed against by women in the workplace), declaring, "It is an urgent necessity not to forget women, who are beginning to fill the workshops of several industries. They are driven by necessity and by bourgeois greed to compete with us. We cannot oppose it; let us help them." However, the outcome of this was government suppression of the movement by means of deportation, imprisonment, the suspension of the right to free assembly, and closing of organizations' headquarters to quell organizing efforts.

During the war of independence from Spain, anarchists joined others in the labor movement in distributing propaganda to Spanish soldiers, urging them not to oppose the separatists, and to join the anarchist cause. A few years previously, anarchists had embraced the ideas espoused by Spanish anarchists of organizing not just in unions, but also forming specifically anarchist groups to educate people and commit violent anti-state acts known as "propaganda of the deed", which carried on into the war of independence. Anarchists placed bombs that blew up bridges and gas pipelines, and contributed to the failed separatist attempt to assassinate the colonial head Captain General Valeriano Weyler in 1896. This led to the government further repressing of anarchists, closing the Sociedad General de Trabajadores (which grew out of the Círculo), mass deportations of activists, and even the forbidding of the lectura in the workplace.

=== The early 20th century ===
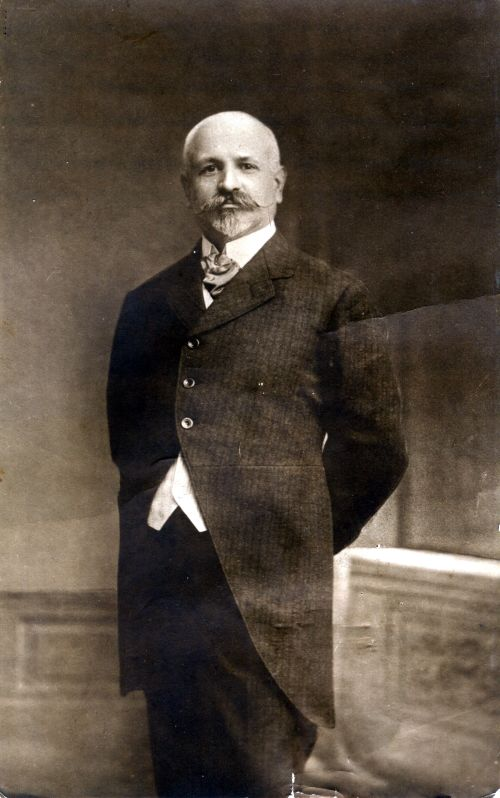
Francesc Ferrer i Guàrdia, a Catalan anarchist whose educational theory inspired the establishment of schools by Cuban anarchists

Following the Spanish–American War, which gave Cuba its independence from Spain, many anarchists were dissatisfied with the conditions that persisted after independence. They cited conditions that were perpetuated by the new government, like suppression of labor movements, US occupations, and dissatisfaction with the school systems. By 1899, anarchist workers had reorganized themselves, under the Alianza de Trabajadores (Worker's Alliance). By September of this year, five of the groups organizers had been arrested, following a mason's strike which spread to all of the construction trade. Around this time, anarchist organizer Errico Malatesta visited Cuba, giving speeches, and interviews to several periodicals, but was soon barred from further speaking engagements by civil governor Emilio Nuñez. Around 1902–03, anarchists and other labor organizers began to attempt to organize the sugar industry, then the largest industry in Cuba. But owners responded quickly, and two workers were murdered, and the crimes never solved.

As well, anarchist activists focused much of their energy towards preparing society for social revolution through education. Anarchists ran schools for children to run counter to the Catholic schools and public schools, believing that religious schools were anathema to their ideas of freedom, and that public schools were too often used to instill ideas of "patriotic nationalism" and discourage free thought in children. In issues of ¡Tierra!, a weekly anarchist newspaper (published from 1899 through 1915, putting out more than 600 issues), writers denounced the public school requirement to pay allegiance to the Cuban flag, and encouraged teaching children that the flag was a symbol of "closed mindedness and divisiveness." Anarchists claimed that students enrolled in such schooling would become "cannon fodder" for a conflict of Liberal and Conservative Party leaders in 1906, which caused the US to intervene and occupy Cuba through 1909. Though anarchists had been running schools since that of the Círculo de Trabajadores, it wasn't until 1906 that the schools began to take on a less traditional flavor. In 1908, anarchists included a manifesto in issues of ¡Tierra! and La Voz del Dependiente, calling for the establishment of schools modeled after Francesc Ferrer's Escuela Moderna (Modern School).

==== Repression and syndicalist activity ====
In 1911, following an unsuccessful strike by tobacco workers, bakers, and teamsters, all supported by ¡Tierra!, the new Governmental Secretary, Gerardo Machado had many Spanish anarchists deported and Cuban anarchists jailed. The repressive policies instituted at this time would continue for 20 years. After García Menocal seized control of the Cuban government in 1917, several general strikes were met with violence from the state. Several anarchist organizers were killed by the state, including Robustiano Fernández and Luis Díaz Blanco. However, anarchists responded in kind with their own violent acts. In time, a group of 77 that the government labeled an "anarcho-syndicalist mob" were deported to Spain. As well, anarchist publications were outlawed (¡Tierra! having been shut down in 1915), and the anarchist Centro Obrero (Worker's Center) was forced to close. Following the anarchist Congress of 1920 in Havana, several bombings took place, including that of the Teatro Nacional while Enrico Caruso was performing, earning 15 to 20 times the yearly salary of an average Cuban worker for the single performance. The following year, Menocal lost control of the government to Alfredo Zayas y Alfonso, leading to a proliferation of anarchist activity. The ¡Tierra! group began to publish books and pamphlets, and at least six other regular anarchist periodicals were publishing.

At this time, the anarcho-syndicalists were still at the head of the labor movement in Cuba. However, despite the maritime, railway, restaurant and tobacco industries being controlled by organized anarchists, it wasn't until 1925 that a major anarchist federation was successfully organized by workers. Similar to the Confederación Nacional del Trabajo of Spain, non-anarchist members of the Confederación Nacional Obrera Cubana (National Cuban Workers Confederation), eventually formed the Communist Party of Cuba in August 1925. By this time, many anarchists (including Alfredo López and Carlos Baliño) had become swept up in the excitement about the Russian Revolution, and had become party to more authoritarian forms of organizing. Many strikes occurred in the fall of 1925, and the government, once again under the leadership of Machado, was quick to suppress the labor movement. Several labor leaders were shot, and several hundred Spanish anarchists were deported in one month. Machado stated "You are right - I don't know what anarchism is, what socialism is, what communism is. For me they are all the same. All bad patriots." Alfredo López, then secretary-general of the CNOC, was arrested first in October 1925, and encouraged to join the government, followed by a second arrest in July 1926. He was "disappeared" at this point, only to have his body found in 1933, after the fall of the Machado government.

==== Reorganization after the departure of López and the Spaniards ====
A modern impression of one of the flags of Fidel Castro's 26th of July Movement, an anti-Batista organization which recruited many Cuban anarchists in the 1950s.

With López gone, control of the CNOC was now fought over by anarchists and Communists. By 1930–1, CNOC had been taken over by the Communists, with anarchists being turned over to the police, still under the control of Machado. Many of the Spanish anarchists involved decided to go back to Spain. Following the new government's passage of a law dictating that at least half of an employer's employees be Cuban-born, a large number of Cuba's Spanish-born anarchists were forced by economic necessity to return to Spain, which greatly diminished the clout of the anarchist movement in Cuba. However, soon the Juventud Libertaria (Libertarian Youth) was founded by a younger generation of anarchists, and by 1936, after the start of the Spanish Civil War, Cuban anarchists had founded the Solidaridad Internacional Antifascista (SIA), to help send money and arms to the CNT and FAI. Many Cuban-born anarchists went to Spain to join the fight, alongside many Spanish-born anarchists exiled from Cuba.

With the rights guaranteed by the 1940 Constitution, anarchists could once again organize themselves with less risk of death or deportation. The SIA and the Federacíon de Grupos Anarquistas de Cuba dissolved themselves, their thousands of members forming the Asociacíon Libertaria de Cuba (Cuban Libertarian Association) (ALC). The ALC held the Primer Congreso Nacional Libertario (First National Libertarian Congress) in 1944, electing a Secretary General, and an Organizational Secretary. This was followed in 1948 by a second congress, which featured the German anarchist Augustin Souchy delivering the opening address. Also, an official propaganda organ for the ALC was chosen, Solideridad Gastronómica, which was published monthly up until it was shut down by the Castro government in December 1960. A third congress was held in 1950, with a heavy focus on keeping the labor movement apolitical and free of interference from politicians and bureaucrats. By the mid-1950s, Fulgencio Batista was once again in power after a successful coup d'état. Many anarchists joined guerrilla groups fighting the Batista government, including that of Fidel Castro's 26th of July Movement, which led to Batista's fleeing Cuba on the last day of 1958.

=== Post-revolutionary period ===
==== 1960–1961 ====
In the first days after taking power, Castro expelled known anarcho-syndicalists from the Confederación de Trabajadores de Cuba (Cuban Workers Confederation, CTC). Because of this, and a general suspicion towards governments, the ALC's national council issued a manifesto denouncing the Castro government and its actions. The periodical Solidaridad Gastronómica also announced their displeasure with the government, saying that it was impossible for a government to be "revolutionary". In January 1960, the ALC convened an assembly, calling for support of the Cuban Revolution, while also declaring opposition to totalitarianism and dictatorships. By the end of the year, the group's journal (Solidaridad Gastronómica) would be shut down by the government. The final issue of the journal commemorated the death of Spanish anarchist Buenaventura Durruti, and contained an editorial declaring that "dictatorships of the proletariat" were impossible, opining that no dictatorship could be of the proletariat, only dominate it.

In the summer of that year, the German anarchist Augustin Souchy was invited by the Castro government to survey the agrarian sector. He was not impressed with what he found, and declared in his pamphlet Testimonios sobre la Revolución Cubana that the system was too close to the Soviet model. Three days after Souchy departed Cuba, the entire print run was seized by the government, and destroyed. However, an Argentinian anarchist publisher republished the pamphlet the following December. Around the same time, the ALC, alarmed at the movement of the Castro government towards a Marxist–Leninist form of rule, issued a declaration, under the name Grupo de Sindicalistas Libertarios to prevent reaction against the ALC's membership. The document declared opposition to the centralism, authoritarian tendencies, and militarism of the new government. After a denunciation of the document by the Secretary General of the Partido Comunista Cubano (PCC), anarchists failed in their search for a printer who would publish a reaction to the denunciation. The publication El Libertario published its last edition that summer.

Following these actions, many anarchists chose to go underground, resorting to "clandestine direct action" as their only means of struggle. According to Cuban anarchist Casto Moscú, "An infinity of manifestos were written denouncing the false postulates of the Castro revolution and calling the populace to oppose it... plans were put into effect to sabotage the basic things sustaining the state." After Manuel Gaona Sousa, one of the founders of the ALC and a former anarchist, issued a manifesto in support of the government, declaring all those opposing the government to be "traitors", Moscú and another anarchist, Manuel González were arrested in Havana. When they were freed, they both immediately went to the Mexican Embassy, where they were accepted. Both eventually made their way from Mexico to Miami, Florida, where they would reunite with many of their Cuban associates.

==== Exile ====
Cover of the Winter 1990 issue of Guángara Libertaria.

Beginning in mid–1960, but greatly accelerating in the summer of 1961, great numbers of Cuban anarchists migrated to the United States. That summer, in New York, the Movimiento Libertario Cubano en el Exilio (Cuban Libertarian Movement in Exile [MLCE]) was formed by some of these exiles, making contact with Spanish anarchists exiled following the Spanish Civil War, who were also living in New York. They also made contact with Sam Dolgoff and the New York-based Libertarian League. "A Clarification and a Declaration of the Cuban Libertarians", a document by Gaona and signed by several other prominent anarchists, excoriated the libertarian press and advocated for the adoption of Castroism. In response to the widespread effect of the manifesto, the MLCE issued the Boletín de Información Libertaria with support from the Libertarian League, and the paper of the Federación Libertaria Argentina (FLA). Among many others, the FLA printed an essay by Abelardo Iglesias titled Revolución y Contrarevolución which stated the differences the Cuban anarchists saw between Marxist and anarchist revolution: "To expropriate capitalist enterprises, handing them over to the workers and technicians, THIS IS REVOLUTION. But to convert them into state monopolies in which the only right of the producer is to obey, THIS IS COUNTER-REVOLUTION."

While Cubans exiled in the U.S. were trying to raise money to support anarchists imprisoned in Cuba, the MLCE was being denounced by anarchists in the U.S. and other countries as puppets of the CIA, and "mere anti-communists". The anarcho-pacifist periodical Liberation printed pro-Castro articles, leading to a protest at their offices by the MLCE and Libertarian League. But in 1965, the MLCE sent Iglesias to Italy to present the case against Castro to the Federazione Anarchica Italiana (FAIT). The FAIT was convinced, and published condemnations in Italian anarchist periodicals such as Umanità Nova, and collected signatures to the condemnation from the Federación Libertaria Argentina, the Federación Libertaria Mexicana, the Anarchist Federation of London, the Sveriges Arbetares Central-Organisation, the French Anarchist Federation, and the Movimiento Libertario Español.

Despite the denunciations from the anarchist organizations and periodicals around the world, opinion began to change in 1976, when Sam Dolgoff published his book The Cuban Revolution: A Critical Perspective. As well, in 1979, the MLCE began publishing a new magazine titled Guángara Libertaria, reprinting Alfredo Gómez' article The Cuban Anarchists, or the Bad Conscience of Anarchism. In 1980, the MLCE and Guángara Libertaria supported the mass evacuation of Cubans from Cuba after many Cuban dissidents occupied the Peruvian embassy in Havana. Many of those who left Cuba at this time joined the editorial collective of Guángara. By 1985, the collective had correspondents around the world, including Mexico, Hawaii, Spain, and Venezuela. The magazine reached a press run of 5000 copies in 1987, making it the largest circulation anarchist periodical in the U.S. However, in 1992, the collective ceased publication of GL, though many of its members continued to publish writings. By 2008, the MLCE was structured as an affinity group and coordinating network for Cuban anarchists of diverse tendencies.

==== Domestic revival ====
Due to the expansion of the activist network known as the Observatorio Crítico Cubano, in August 2010, the Alfredo López Libertarian Workshop (Spanish: Taller Libertario Alfredo López, TLAA) was established in Havana, marking the emergence of the first anarchist organization in Cuba in decades. In 2015, they promoted the foundation of the Anarchist Federation of Central America and the Caribbean, which was constituted in Santiago de los Caballeros, with delegates from the Dominican Republic, Cuba, United States, Bonaire, El Salvador and Puerto Rico. In May 2018, they established the ABRA social center, after having crowdfunded the project with help from anarchists in France and Spain.

The contemporary anarchist movement continued to grow from small subcultures into a united movement, attracting activists from the country's trade unions, youth organizations and student associations. When the 2021 Cuban protests broke out, Cuban anarchists were among the voices that supported the mass movement, criticizing both the United States embargo and the policies of the Cuban government.

== See also ==
- Category:Cuban anarchists
- List of anarchist movements by region
- Anarchism in the Dominican Republic
- History of Cuba
- Timeline of Cuban history
- Timeline of the Cuban Revolution

== Sources ==
- Barrio, Hilda; Jenkins, Gareth (2003). The Che Handbook. New York: St. Martin's Press. ISBN 0-312-32246-1. OCLC 441650937.
- Cappelletti, Ángel J. (2018). Anarchism in Latin America. Translated by Gabirel Palmer-Fernández. Edinburgh: AK Press. pp. 225–239. ISBN 9781849352826. OCLC 1044939183.
- Casanovas, Joan (1998). Bread Or Bullets: Urban Labor and Spanish Colonialism in Cuba, 1850–1898. Pittsburgh: University of Pittsburgh Press. ISBN 978-0-8229-5675-4. OCLC 231821713.
- Dolgoff, Sam (1977). The Cuban Revolution: A Critical Perspective. Montréal: Black Rose Books. ISBN 0-919618-36-7. OCLC 3629307.
- Fernández, Frank (2001). Cuban Anarchism: The History of a Movement. Translated by Bufe, Charles. Tucson, Arizona: See Sharp Press. ISBN 978-1-884365-19-5. OCLC 248314224.
- Marshall, Peter H. (1993). "Cuba". Demanding the Impossible: A History of Anarchism. London: Fontana Press. pp. 514–518. ISBN 978-0-00-686245-1. OCLC 1042028128.
- Matthews, Herbert Lionel (1975). Revolution in Cuba. New York: Charles Scribner's Sons. ISBN 978-0-684-14213-5. OCLC 422025348.
- Shaffer, Kirwin R. (2003a). "Freedom Teaching: Anarchism and Education in Early Republican Cuba, 1898–1925". The Americas. 60 (2): 151–183. doi:10.1353/tam.2003.0113. ISSN 1533-6247. JSTOR 3654779. S2CID 143596543 – via Project MUSE.
- Thomas, Hugh (1971). Cuba: The Pursuit of Freedom (1st ed.). New York: Harper & Row. ISBN 0060142596. OCLC 1055433841.
