= Leda Rafanelli =

Italian anarchist writer (1880–1971)

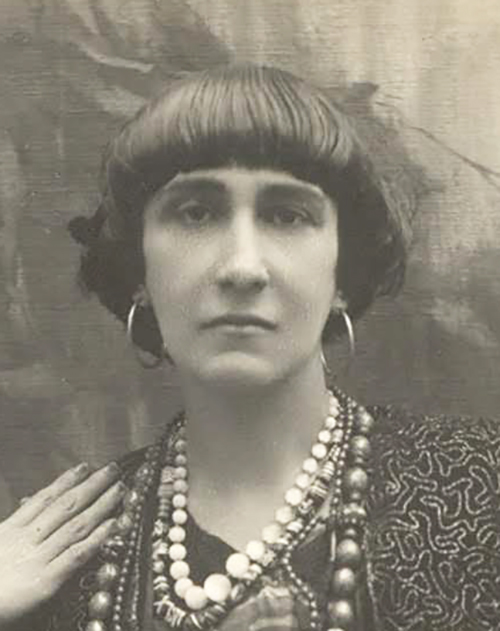
- Rafanelli in 1916
- Born: July 4, 1880; Pistoia, Tuscany, Kingdom of Italy
- Died: September 13, 1971 (aged 91); Genoa, Liguria, Italy
- Occupations: Publisher; author; fortune teller
- Partner: Giuseppe Monanni
- Children: 1

Leda Bruna Rafanelli (July 4, 1880 – September 13, 1971) was an Italian publisher, anarchist, and prolific author.

== Early life ==
Leda Bruna Rafanelli was born on July 4, 1880, in Pistoia, Italy. After finishing elementary school, she became an apprentice at a local printing press, where she became acquainted with the publishing world, and anarchist/socialist ideas. In 1897, she published Pensieri, a book of poems, with her brother. Around the turn of the century, her experience living briefly in Alexandria, Egypt, cemented her interest in Eastern ideas and led to her studying the Arabic language and converting to Islam. Her commitments to anarchism and Islam were lifelong.

== Career ==
Rafanelli moved to Florence and married Luigi Polli, an anarchist bookseller whom she met in the Chamber of Labor, in May 1902. They founded Rafanelli Polli, a publisher of anti-military, anti-clerical, feminist pamphlets authored by Carlo Cafiero, Francesco Saverio Merlino, and Rafanelli herself. Rafanelli Polli also published the anarchist periodical La Blouse (1906–1910). She published her first novel (Sogno d'amore) in 1905. Her connection with Polli dissipated, though they remained friendly until his death in 1922. In the early 1900s, Rafanelli helped to co-found a committee to aid political victims from 1890s revolts and was targeted for distributing revolutionary and anti-military propaganda in Fusignano.

She entered a relationship with Giuseppe Monanni, an Arezzo printer who published Vir: novissima rivista di alte questioni sociali on anarcho-futurist ideas influenced by the individualism of Max Stirner and Friedrich Nietzsche. They moved to Milan where they edited Ettore Molinari and Nella Giacomelli's Il grido della folla and La protesta umana. They would publish anarchist and individualist periodicals including La sciarpa nera, La questione sociale, La Rivolta, and La Libertà. Rafanelli and Monanni founded a press in Milan, later known as Casa editrice sociale, that published multiple works by Rafanelli: Bozzetti sociali, Seme nuovo, and La castità clericale. She dedicated L'ultimo martire del libero pensiero ("The Last Martyr of Free Thought") to Francisco Ferrer, a Catalan pedagogue whose execution had become a cause célèbre and movement. Rafanelli wrote Verso la Siberia: scene dalla rivoluzione russa ("Towards Siberia: Scenes from the Russian Revolution") during Italian protests against Nicholas II under a pseudonym, Bazaroff, taken from Ivan Turgenev's Fathers and Sons. Her press published her brother's Marinai italiani a Tripoli in 1913. The press's image was enhanced by association with the illustrator Carlo Carrà, with whom Rafanelli had a brief relationship. The press published works by Charles Albert, Charles Darwin, Pietro Gori, Peter Kropotkin, and Elisée Reclus. They paused publishing during World War I. One of their major works was the republication of Nietzsche's complete works in Italian, published between 1926 and 1927.

Rafanelli had a friendship with Benito Mussolini prior to his rise as Italian dictator. Mussolini spoke at a 1913 commemoration of the Paris Commune as the director of Avanti!. Rafanelli wrote in praise of his oratory ability and stayed in touch via letters and visits for the next year, until his military interventionist stance became readily apparent. She later published their correspondence in Una donna e Mussolini (1946) and privately admitted her error in judging his personality.

In the interwar period, she republished Bozzetti sociali and the short stories Donne e femmine (1922). Rafanelli published two novels under pseudonyms: Incantamento (1921) as Sahra and L’oasi: romanzo arabo (1929) as Étienne Gamalier. Her relationship with Monanni dissipated in the 1930s, as did her militant activism. She worked as a fortune teller, a teacher of Arabic, and editorial work. Rafanelli continued to write for the anarchist periodical Umanità Nova. She moved to Genoa in the 1940s, where she died on September 13, 1971.

== Personal life ==
Rafanelli and Monanni had a son, Elio Marsillo (1910–1944), whom they called Aini (Arabic for 'my eye' or 'my dear').

== Selected works ==
- (in Italian) Una donna e Mussolini: la corrispondenza amorosa, 1975 Rizzoli.
- (in Italian) Leda Rafanelli-Carlo Carrà: un romanzo: arte e politica di un incontro, 2005 Centro internazionale della grafica.
- (in Italian) L'eroe della folla, 1925 Casa Editrice sociale.
- (in Italian) La caserma... scuola della nazione.
- (in Italian) Alle madri italiane, Nerbini.
- (in Italian) Lavoratori, 1959.
- (in Italian) Bozzetti sociali 1921 Casa editrice sociale.
- (in Italian) La "castità" clericale Società Ed. Milanese.
- (in Italian) Valida braccia: opuscolo di propaganda contro la costruzione di nuove carceri, 1907 Rafanelli-Polli.
- (in Italian) Per l'idea nostra. Raccolta di articoli e bozzetti di propaganda Rafanelli-Polli.
- (in Italian) Amando e combattendo. Racconto sociale, 1906 Serantoni.
- (in Italian) Un'anarchica femminista e rivoluzionaria eccezionale, 1995 Archivio Famiglia Berneri.
- (in Italian) Società presente e società avvenire, 1907 Libr. editrice Rafanelli-Polli.
- (in Italian) La corona e la blouse: confronto sociale Biblioteca della rivista di letteratura operaia "La blouse".
- (in Italian) Seme nuovo, 1912 Società editoriale milanese.
- (in Italian) La bastarda del principe. Madre coronata e madre plebea, 1904 Nerbini.
- (in Italian) Contro la scuola, 1907 Tip. Polli.
- (in Italian) La scuola borghese Libreria editrice sociale.
- (in Italian) Una tragedia Rafanelli-Polli.
- (in Italian) Verso la Siberia.
- (in Italian) Scene della rivoluzione russa.
- (in Italian) Incantamento.
- (in Italian) La signora mia nonna.
- (in Italian) Donne e femmine.
- (in Italian) L'oasi.
- (in Italian) Nada.
- (in Italian) Le memorie di una chiromante.

== Bibliography ==
- Butta, Fausto (2015). Living Like Nomads: The Milanese Anarchist Movement Before Fascism. Cambridge Scholars Publishing. ISBN 9781443881593.
- Pakieser, Andrea, ed. (2014). I Belong Only to Myself: The Life and Writings of Leda Rafanelli. AK Press. ISBN 9781849351959.
- Sierra, María; Pro, Juan (October 2022). "Gypsy Anarchism: Navigating Ethnic and Political Identities". European History Quarterly. 52 (4): 593–612. doi:10.1177/02656914221097011. hdl:10261/280207. ISSN 0265-6914.
- Spackman, Barbara (2017). "Muslim in Milan: The Orientalisms of Leda Rafanelli". Accidental Orientalists: Modern Italian Travelers in Ottoman Lands. Liverpool University Press. pp. 154–210. ISBN 978-1-78694-020-9.
