= Giovanna Berneri =

Italian educationalist and anarchist (1897–1962)

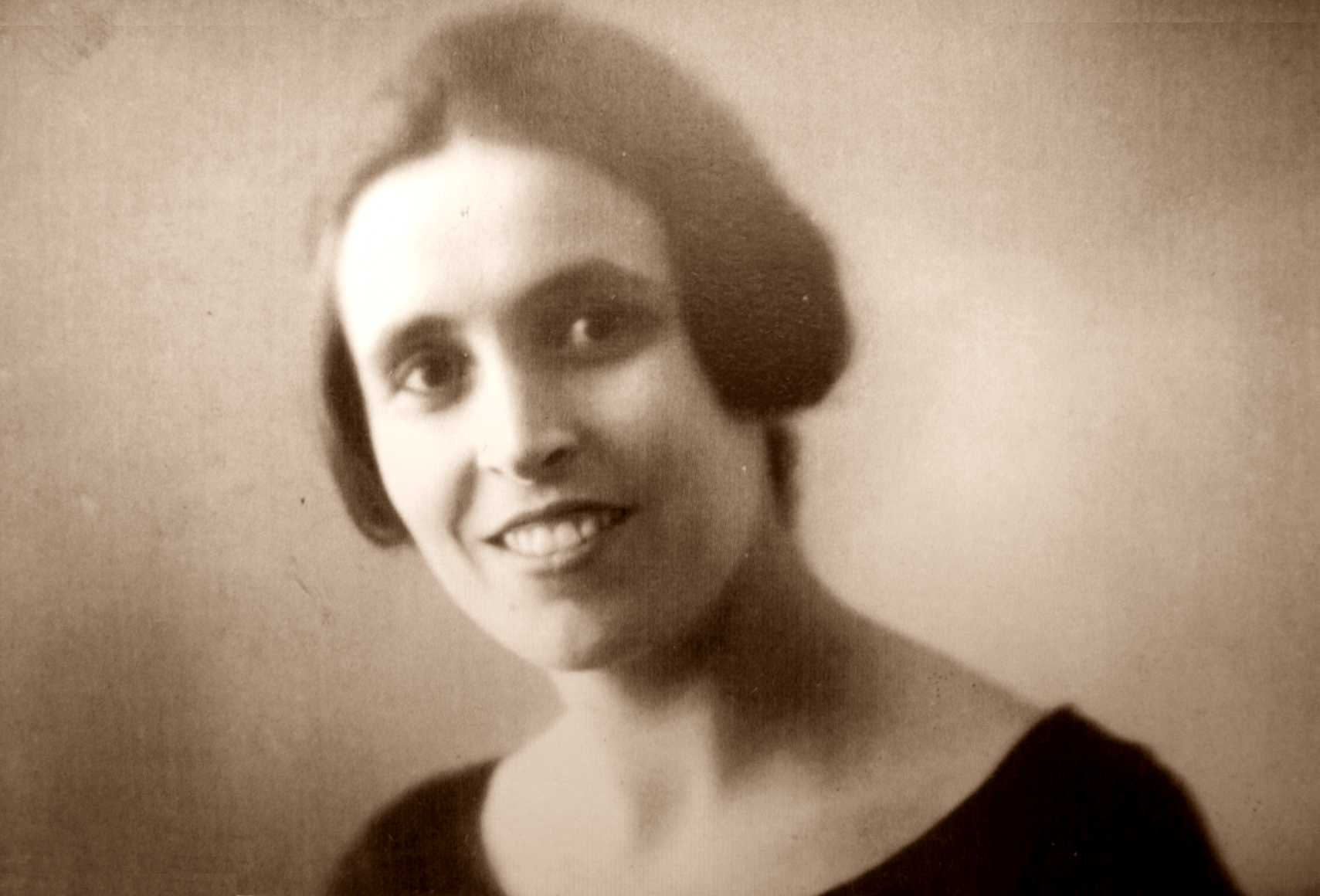
- Giovanna Berneri
- Born: Giovannina Caleffi; 5 May 1897; Gualtieri, Reggio Emilia, Emilia-Romagna, Italy
- Died: 14 March 1962 (aged 64); Nervi (Genoa), Liguria, Italy
- Occupations: School teacher libertarian anarchist activist Writer
- Spouse: Camillo Berneri (1897–1937)
- Children: Maria Luisa Berneri (1918–1949); Giliana Berneri (1919–1998)
- Parent(s): Giuseppe Caleffi; Caterina Simonazzi Caleffi

Giovanna Berneri (born Giovannina Caleffi: 5 May 1897 – 14 March 1962) was an educationalist and militant libertarian anarchist. She was born and died in Italy, but, largely for political reasons, spent much of her life in other countries: some of her most productive years were lived in France. After the war, between 1946 and 1962 she edited the Italian language magazine Volontà.

She was born Giovannina Caleffi, but most sources give her forename / Christian name as Giovanna.

== Early life ==
Giovannina Caleffi was born into a peasant family in Gualtieri, a small town set in the intensively cultivated countryside between Mantua and Parma. She was one of five recorded children of Giuseppe and Caterina Simonazzi Caleffi. While she was still young her father emigrated with his eldest son to the United States. Giovanna attended junior school in Gualtieri and senior school in Reggio Emilia, a half hour train ride to the south. She emerged from her education in 1915 with a teaching diploma. While at school in Reggio Emilia, she come into contact with the socialist currents circulating at the time, taking a great interest in the political seminars conducted by Camillo Prampolini. At the age of fifteen she renounced her catholicism which led to major ructions within the family. One of her teachers was Adalgisa Fochi (1865–1957), already established as a writer and activist member of socialist feminist circles, and later Giovanna's mother in law.

On receiving her teaching diploma in 1915 Giovanna started to work as an elementary school teacher at Santa Vittoria, a quarter of Gualtieri. The next year she obtained a permanent teaching post nearby at Montecchio Emilia, a short distance to the south-east of Parma. It was in 1916 than she met Camillo Berneri, the son of her former teacher, Adalgisa Fochi. Camillo was a high school student and activist member of the Socialist Youth Federation ("Federazione Giovanile Socialista"), an organisation which shortly after this formally abandoned its anarchist ideology. Around this time Camillo relocated to Arezzo, where he was joined by his mother and by Giovanna a year or so later. Camillo and Giovanna fell in love and married on 3 January 1917 or 4 November 1917 (sources differ), with the written permission of their parents, possibly reflecting the fact that they were neither of them yet 21.

== Family life in Tuscany ==
The backdrop to their lives between 1914 and 1918 was provided by the First World War, and shortly after they were married Camillo was conscripted into the army. He was therefore not able to be present for the birth of their elder daughter, Maria Luisa, who was born on 1 March 1918. When he was released from the army the family remained in Tuscany, but relocated from Arezzo to Florence, which is where their younger daughter, Giliana, was born on 5 October 1919. Both daughters would inherit their parents' political beliefs.

As manifestations of political fascism became a daily reality in northern Italy, the Berneri-Caleffi home became a place of discussion and refuge for intellectual opponents of fascism such as Gaetano Salvemini and Piero Calamandrei. Others included the brothers Carlo and Nello Rosselli, Ernesto Rossi and Piero Jahier. With two small children to bring up, Giovanna Berneri was more preoccupied with surviving the economic hardship resulting from her husband's activism than with political activism of her own, although as Camillo wrote about this time to Salvemini, she accepted and broadly shared his ideas. Increasingly the family faced harassment and repression from the Fascists, who had taken power nationally in 1922. Camillo refused to swear allegiance to the new régime and lost his teaching post. He fled secretly to Paris in March or April 1926. Giovanna and their daughters moved in with her parents in Gualtieri, but when the intensity of government surveillance had sufficiently relaxed they were able to join Camillo in Paris, crossing the frontier at Ventimiglia on 1 August of the same year.

== Exile in Paris ==
The family set up home in Saint-Maur-des-Fossés, a suburb in the south-east of Paris, where they embarked on a precarious existence. The community of Italian political exiles in the Paris area was a substantial one, and the Italian authorities did not lose sight of the political dissidents simply because they were no longer in Italy. Camillo Berneri was betrayed by a comrade called Ermanno Menapace who turned out to be a spy for the Italian security service. As a result of this he was arrested and, in 1929, expelled from France. While Camillo led the life of a fugitive in a succession of European countries, Giovanna did what she could to obtain a French residence permit for her husband, using her network of contacts and invoking the services of a Brussels lawyer called Paul De Bock. While all this was going on it fell to Giovanna to bring up and support the children. In 1933, with economic support from Louis Lecoin, Giovanna Berneri opened a grocery store in order to be able to subsist. The little shop at Rue de Terre-Neuve 20 soon became a meeting point for people who would later become prominent in the anarchist movement. They were kept under strict surveillance by the French police and security services, none more so than the wife of the high-profile anarchist philosopher Camillo Berneri.

== Spanish Civil War ==
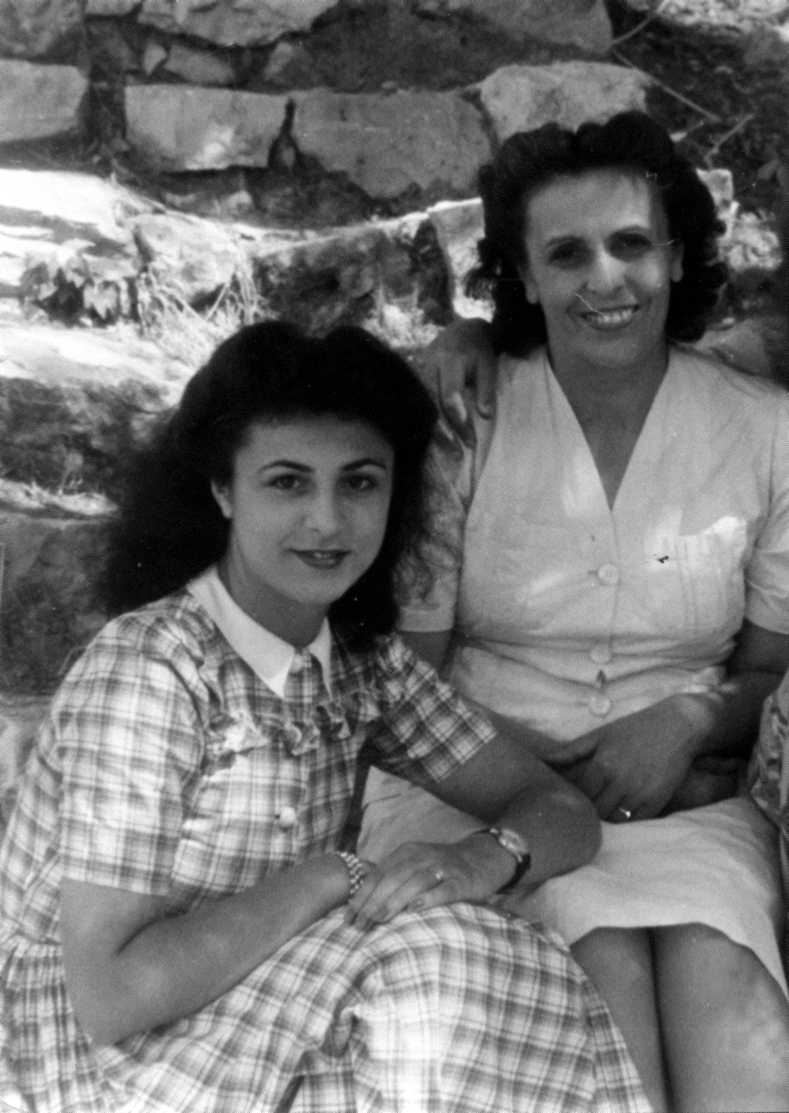
Giovanna Berneri with her daughter, Maria Luisa, in 1936

Following the outbreak of the Spanish Civil War, Camillo Berneri lost little time in traveling to Catalonia which was a focus of the Libertarian movement, and here he joined the National Workers' Confederation ("Confederación Nacional del Trabajo"). With other confederation members he joined the Ascaso battalion and during 1936 participated in several battles against the Fascist forces. However, the bitter splits in the Soviet Communist party which made the period one of Purges in Moscow sent out powerful echoes in the west, and early in May 1937 Camillo Berneri was one of several prominent fighters together with members of Workers' Party of Marxist Unification ("Partit Obrer d'Unificació Marxista" / POUM) to be assassinated in Barcelona, probably on the orders of Joseph Stalin. Giovanna and her elder daughter Maria Luisa attended his funeral, which marked the point from which Giovanna herself took up the anarchist cause more actively, building up contacts internationally, notably in the United States. She started writing for "Controcorrente", an Italian language anarchist newspaper based in Boston. In 1938 she published a collection of her late husband's work under the title "Pensieri e Battaglie" ("Thoughts and Fights") in a volume which included an introduction by Emma Goldman. From 1939 she also wrote for "l' Adunata dei refrattari", another Italian American publication, based in New York, although her contributions at this stage were anonymized for security reasons.

== Second World War: arrest, imprisonment, lengthy deportation, trial and more imprisonment ==
War was declared by France at the end of the summer in 1939, and in May 1940 the German army invaded France. The north and the west of the country came under direct military control while in the south of France a collaborationist puppet régime was installed. On 18 October 1940 Giovanna Berneri was arrested, like other Italian political refugees, at the behest of the Italian government and held at the prison of La Santé for three months. By this time her elder daughter had married Vernon Richards, an Anglo-Italian intellectual and emigrated to London. Her younger daughter Giliana Berneri spent time in a French internment camp for enemy aliens, and may have spent the later war years in the United States.

In February 1941 Giovanna Berneri was transferred to Austria and from there to Germany, where she spent approximately five months in detention in a succession of prisons, before being returned to Austria, and from there to Italy. On 25 August 1941 she was condemned to spend a year in prison in Lacedonia (Avellino) for "having engaged in subversive activities abroad which endangered the political conduct of the state" (per "aver svolto all’estero attività sovversiva dimostrandosi elemento pericoloso per gli ordinamenti politici dello Stato").

On her release she remained clandestinely in the south for a period. At some stage, she returned to her home town, Gualtieri, re-establishing contact with Cesare Zaccaria (1897–1961), a family friend from the past, and moving in to live with him. There was no possibility of returning to France because the authorities there would have been fearful that she might re-establish links with anarchists and antifascists. Meanwhile, on the Italian home front, six days after Mussolini's final meeting with Hitler, the Fascist government collapsed, formally on 25 July 1943.

== Epilogue to war: prologue to peace ==
The fall of fascism triggered a period of resistance, including anarchist resistance. With Armido Abbate, Pio Turroni and others, Giovanna Caleffi and Cesare Zaccaria determined to rebuild the movement. In 1944 they launched the clandestinely produced "La Rivoluzione libertaria" and "Volontà" which, after the Congress at Carrara, developed from a single page news-sheet to a newspaper, with contributors including Ignazio Silone, Albert Camus and Gaetano Salvemini. Giovanna believed that the anarchist movement needed to adapt to the new energies of the times, and to the new internationalist dynamic emerging with the victory of the allied powers in the Second World War. Of particular significance is the letter she wrote in April 1945 to a group of anarchists taking their lead from the Federation of Libertarian Communists ("Federazione Comunista Libertaria") in Livorno in which she expresses her opposition to the idea of the Federation joining up with the National Liberation Committee in Livorno, recalling the events in Spain in the 1930s, and especially the fights in Barcelona in 1937 against the Stalinist communists. Those experiences had convinced Caleffi that the Communist Party line, which was also the dominating voice in the Livorno National Liberation Committee, could never avoid being pro-Stalinist, especially given the total power exercised, in Italy, by Palmiro Togliatti over the party.

== Democracy in Italy ==
Together with Cesare Zaccaria, Giovanna was committed to distributing information on methods of birth control. In 1948 they published a booklet entitled "Birth control" ("Il controllo delle nascite"). The booklet comprised a collection of writings that had already appeared during 1947 in "Volontà", intended to demonstrate that a baby boom in a country such as Italy could only lead to increases in poverty and social inequality. The booklet was seized by police: Caleffi and Zaccaria faced prosecution for "propaganda against procreation". The legal process took some time, but in May 1950 they were acquitted.

At the same time Caleffi was submitting articles to various libertarian publications in Italy and to anarchist publications among the emigrant Italian-American communities across the Atlantic. Others of her articles had appeared in the USA via leaks during the years of fascist control in Italy. Publications for which she wrote included "Umanità Nova", "Il Mondo" and "Il Lavoro nuovo" of Genoa. US publications included "L' Adunata dei refrattari" and "Controcorrente".

Another of her projects involved social and economic support for the underprivileged. In summer 1948 she undertook a project that was particularly important to her, arranging holidays for the children of comrades in the south with economic and logistical support from comrades in the (more prosperous) north. It was not the first time something of this nature had been attempted, but it was nevertheless considered innovative, and the experiment was sufficiently successful for the exercise to be repeated in 1949. In 1949 she was also hit by the death in north London, in childbirth, of her elder daughter, Maria Luisa (who had lived in England since her marriage to Vernon Richards in 1937). To commemorate an ideology which both mother and daughter had made their own, Caleffi launched an ambitious new project: to create a permanent community at Cesenatico that would carry her daughter's name, open to the children of anarchists from round the world. Lack of available funds thwarted the original plans, but in 1951 a settlement was opened near Piano di Sorrento at Cesare Zaccaria's country house. The "Colonia Maria Luisa Berneri" endured, though burdened by growing indebtedness, till 1957, when the house ceased to be available following the break-up of the relationship with Zaccaria. By that time the accumulated debt burden had grown to 112,419 lire, which was a not inconsiderable sum, especially having regard to the limited possibilities for income generation that were inherent in it.

== Genoa years ==
In 1956 Giovanna Caleffi relocated to Nervi, which by this time had been subsumed into the long coastal Genoa conurbation. During the resistance years Nervi had been the operational base of a force of anarchist partisans which had included Lorenzo Parodi, and it was to Nervi that she had just transferred the management of "Volontà" in order to facilitate national distribution. The publication was in a period of crisis, since the personal break-up between Caleffi and Zaccaria had coincided with the latter's withdrawal from the anarchist movement. There are suggestions that his somewhat cerebral quasi-liberal approach had always presented a slightly awkward fit with the more passionate radicalism of Italian anarchism.

Caleffi now attempted to recreate in the Genoa area, in various different forms, the "Colonia Maria Luisa Berneri". She received much support from comrades, and managed to acquire a suitable property, less than half a mile from the beaches, at Ronchi near Marina di Massa. She managed to keep the operation running for three years, supported by her surviving daughter and her friend, Aurelio Chessa.

Giovanna Celeffi died from a heart attack on 14 March 1962 while being released from hospital where she had been treated for another condition. Thanks to Aurelio Chessa and, more recently, his daughter Fiamma, a large amount of data on Giovanna and Camillo Bernereo, their family and fellow anarchists, has been systematically catalogued and aggregated with other collections in the Berneri Family-Aurelio Chessa Archive.
