= Nella Giacomelli =

Italian anarchist (1873–1949)

- Born: 2 July 1873; Lodi, Lombardy, Italy
- Died: 12 February 1949 (aged 75); Desenzano del Garda, Lombardy, Italy

Nella Giacomelli (1873–1949) was an Italian anarchist, teacher and journalist.

== Biography ==
Nella Giacomelli was born on 2 July 1873, in the Lombard city of Lodi, the second of three children by Paolo and Maria Baggi. Her parents separated and her father committed suicide while she was still young. After completing her education, like her older sister Fede, she graduated as a teacher. From 1892, she taught at secondary schools in Maslianico and Cocquio, but resigned in 1897 following conflict with the local authorities. By this time, she had joined the Italian Socialist Party (PSI). In early May 1898, food riots took place throughout Lombardy, culminating in the Italian Army committing a massacre of Milanese workers. Giacomelli herself was arrested during the riots on 8 May and sentenced to a year in prison. After she was released, she moved to Milan.

At the turn of the 20th century, she worked as a governess for the children of Ettore Molinari, a chemist and anarchist activist. Together with Molinari, in 1902, she established the anarchist newspaper Il Grido della folla and joined its editorial staff. The following year, she confessed to Oberdan Gigli that she had a child who died young and that she was on the verge of having an affair with Molinari, who at the time had a wife and children, and who she herself wished to have a child with. She remained with Molinari and his children until their deaths.

Giacomelli rarely participated publicly in the Italian anarchist movement, preferring to only attend private meetings and write for the anarchist press under the pseudonym "Ireos". She wrote on various topics, from free love and women's rights to anarchist intentional communities, her publications being frequently interrupted by bouts of depression. In 1905, she moved to the L'Essai commune in Aiglemont, but would come away with a critical view of the experience. She took on an individualist anarchist perspective, which frequently put her at odds with other anarchists that favoured organisation and social struggle. In 1906, she and Molinari broke away from Il Grido della folla, due to an interpersonal conflict with its editor Giovanni Gavilli, and established La Protesta Umana. They placed under the editorial control of Paolo Schicchi, but soon came into conflict with him and ousted him in favour of Giuseppe Monnanni and Leda Rafanelli.

After La Protesta Umana shut down in 1909, Giacomelli withdrew into self-imposed social isolation until the outbreak of World War I. Under the pseudonym "Petit Jardin", she took an internationalist position and sharply criticised anarchists that supported intervention against the Central Powers. On 30 April 1916, she was arrested for attempting to organise a political demonstration by women on International Workers' Day; the Italian authorities initially repatriated her to Lodi, but allowed her to return to Milan on the condition that she cease political agitation. During the Biennio Rosso that followed the end of the war, Giacomelli returned to political activism. In April 1919, she and Molinari participated in the founding congress of the Italian Anarchist Communist Union (UCAI) and established the new organisation's newspaper Umanità Nova. In this paper, she finally began publishing under her own name, but soon left the paper due to its focus on revolutionary agitation over individual and cultural change. In February 1921, she and other contributors to the paper were arrested on conspiracy charges, although she was acquitted the following month. She was again arrested on conspiracy charges following the Diana massacre, but was again quickly released.

From 1921, she collaborated on Carlo Molaschi's newspaper Pagine libertaire, once again under pseudonyms, signing "Inkyo" and "vice Rudel". After the rise of Italian fascism to power, in May 1928, she and two of Molinari's sons were arrested under suspicion of complicity in an assassination attempt against Benito Mussolini. They were released by September 1928, following the intervention of her childhood friend Ada Negri. Giacomelli subsequently retired to the Molinari villa in Rivoltella del Garda, where she spent her remaining years. After witnessing the fall of the Fascist regime in Italy and the constitution of the Italian Republic, on 12 February 1949, Giacomelli died in Desenzano del Garda.

== Bibliography ==
- Antonioli, Maurizio (2004). "GIACOMELLI, Nella". Dizionario biografico online degli anarchici italiani (in Italian). Biblioteca Franco Serantini.
- Serci, Maria Antonietta (2000). "GIACOMELLI, Nella". Dizionario Biografico degli Italiani (in Italian). Vol. 54. Treccani. ISBN 9788812000326.
