= Anarchism in the Dominican Republic =

Anarchism in the Dominican Republic first surfaced in the late 19th century, as part of the nascent workers' movement.

== History ==
In the 1880s and 1890s, Spanish immigrant workers brought anarchism to the Dominican Republic. In 1884, the mutualist association La Alianza Cibaeña was founded. This was followed by the Sociedad Artesenal Hijos del Pueblo in 1890. In 1897, the Unión de Panaderos de Santo Domingo was founded, becoming the country's first trade union. Bakers, cobblers, and bricklayers led the country's first wave of strikes, protesting in Parque Colon against their respective employers.

In the 1920s, after the US occupation had ended and the Third Republic was established, the Federación Local del Trabajo de Santo Domingo was founded. However, in 1930 Rafael Trujillo seized power from the democratically elected government of Horacio Vásquez in a coup d'état, establishing a right-wing dictatorship which suppressed all political opposition - including the anarchist movement.

Following the end of the Cold War and the beginning of a new period of globalisation, the anarchist movement in the Caribbean began to reorganise, with new anarchist groups forming in the Dominican Republic. In 2015, Dominican anarchists hosted a regional congress in Santiago de los Caballeros, where they established the Anarchist Federation of Central America and the Caribbean (Spanish: Federación Anarquista del Centro America y del Caribe; FACC).

== See also ==
- List of anarchist movements by country
- Anarchism in Cuba

== Bibliography ==
- Cappelletti, Angel J. (2018). Anarchism in Latin America. Translated by Gabirel Palmer-Fernández. Edinburgh: AK Press. pp. 223–224. ISBN 9781849352826. OCLC 1044939183.
