= Barbara Spackman =

Retired Berkeley professor

Barbara Spackman (born April 22, 1952) is an American author, researcher and retired Professor at Berkeley. She worked as distinguished Professor Emerita of Italian studies and Comparative literature; Former Giovanni and Ruth Elizabeth Cecchetti Chair of Italian Literature Her core studies involve Italian art and late history, specially the rise of fascism and other specialised topics like feminism and racism.

== Works ==
- Decadent Genealogies: The Rhetoric of Sickness from Baudelaire to D'Annunzio (Cornell University Press, 1989)
- Fascist Virilities: Rhetoric, Ideology, and Social Fantasy in Italy (University of Minnesota Press, 1996)
- Accidental Orientalists: Modern Italian Travelers in Ottoman Lands (Liverpool University Press 2017)

== Achievements ==
- Fascist Virilities won the 1998 MLA Howard R. Marraro, and Aldo and Jeanne Scaglione Prizes for Italian Literary Studies.
- 2018: She won the American Association of Italian Studies Prize (Renaissance, Eighteenth and Nineteenth Centuries)
- 2018: MLA Howard R. Marraro Prize Honorable Mention
