= Etiam si omnes, ego non =

Latin Biblical motto meaning "Even if all others [do],... I will not."

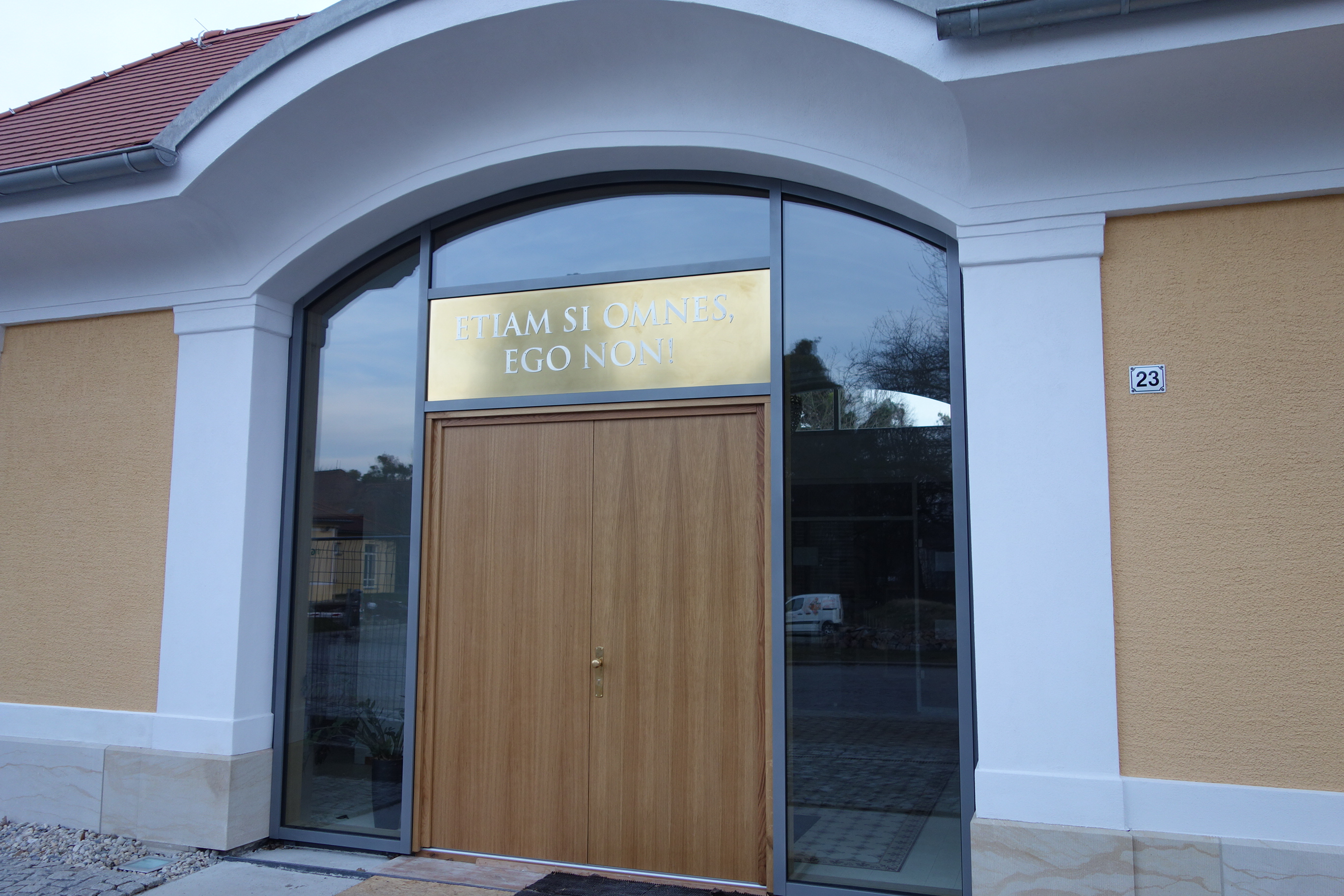
Latin motto "Etiam si omnes ego non!" above the door of the listed building at Schlosspark 23 on the grounds of the former Pirna-Sonnenstein sanatorium and nursing home.

Etiam si omnes, ego non is a Latin phrase often used as a motto, which translates into English approximately as "Even if all others [do], I [will] not".

It is the motto of the family of Clermont-Tonnerre; the title of a poem by Ernest Myers and the inscription on the tombstone of Italian philosopher Giuseppe Rensi. It is also the motto of the Italian Joint Special Forces Operations Headquarters.

A variant is Latin: Et si omnes ego non, as written on the door of Philipp von Boeselager's home, highlighting the necessity of maintaining one's own opinion and moral judgment, even in the face of a differing view held by the majority (in particular, it refers to von Boeselager's dissent and resistance against Hitler during the Nazi dictatorship). The last part of the phrase, in its German translation, is the title of an autobiographical work of Joachim Fest: Ich nicht.

A longer variant of the phrase can be seen in a passage from the Vulgate Gospel of Matthew 26:33: Latin: "Respondens autem Petrus ait illi et si omnes scandalizati fuerint in te ego numquam scandalizabor.", lit. 'Peter replied, 'All the others may turn away because of you. But I never will.'' (Greek: Εἰ πάντες σκανδαλισθήσονται ἐν σοί, ἐγὼ οὐδέποτε σκανδαλισθήσομαι, Ei pantes skandalisthēsontai en soi, egō oudepote skandalisthēsomai.)

== See also ==
- Latin phrases
- Philipp von Boeselager
