= Aurelio Chessa =

Sardinian journalist and historian (1913–1996)

- Born: 30 October 1913; Putifigari, Sassari, Sardinia, Italy
- Died: 26 October 1996 (aged 82); Rapallo, Liguria, Italy
- Occupations: Journalist/Historian/Writer; Anarchist
- Spouse: Mazzina Antonelli
- Children: Flamma Chessa
- Parent(s): Antonio Chessa; Maria Angela Piras

Aurelio Chessa (30 October 1913 – 26 October 1996) was a Sardinian anarchist, journalist and historian. Among researchers of twentieth century anarchism he is also noted as an archivist.

== Biography ==
Aurello Chessa was born in Putifigari, a village in the north western part of Sardinia. He enlisted as a sailor on 31 March 1931, as a result of which he came to spend long enough in Egypt to learn how to bake Egyptian bread. On 9 November 1939 he received a one-year prison sentence for insubordination, following which he spent four months from 24 October 1939 till 27 February 1940 in the San Francesco jail in Genoa. After the Second World War, in 1945 his maternal uncle, the anarchist Francesco Piras, who had introduced him to the Libertarian Movement fled to France: Chessa took over a large amount of his uncle's archival material on the movement, establishing the basis of a document collection that would grow during the ensuing decades.

In 1945 he started working as a functionary for the Italian State Railway Company. In 1946 he started contributing to "Volontà", a radical journal recently established by Giovanna Berneri, the widow of Camillo Berneri who had been assassinated in Barcelona a decade earlier. Chessa would continue to work on "Volontà" for many years. In 1947 he was a co-founder of a Genoa branch of the Italian Anarchist Federation (Federazione anarchica italiana / FAI), described in one source as a party of the "anti-organisation tendency". The FAI held a congress at Canossa in 1948 in which he participated, and on 1–2 May 1954 he presided at the FAI's national congress at Livorno as president of the congress, while insisting that he was participating in a personal capacity and not as the representative of any party, group or faction.

On 26 May 1958 Chessa found himself facing trial in a Genoa court, charged with "Civil Disobedience". The case involved his advocacy of abstention in that year's General Election. He was sentenced to a six-month prison term but given leave to appeal. At his appeal hearing, which took place on 23 December 1958, the court accepted a lesser charge of "Instigation", and a fine was substituted for imprisonment. In the same year he was writing articles under the pseudonym "Paratacca" on matters such as voting and democracy: these appeared in Lo Svegliarino, a newspaper published in Carrara. Throughout this period he continued to work for the national railway company, and in 1960 his activist participation in the major strike of 8 June in Genoa earned him a reprimand from the railway management. Between 1964 and 1967 he wrote several articles about the Ugo Mazzucchelli trial. Meanwhile, in December 1965, he was a co-founder in Pisa of the "Gruppo d'Iniziativa Anarquista" (GIA), a breakaway faction from the FAI following policy differences.

Chessa's old friend Giovanna Berneri died in March 1962 her daughter, Giliana Berneri passed a large volume of papers on her parents' and grandparents' activist and writing careers within the Anarchist movement to him. Much of Aurelia Chessa's energy subsequently was devoted to ordering and maintaining what was now a large and growing archive of historical importance. On 4 April 1966 he retired after 22 years of service from his work with the railway and relocated from Genoa to Pistoia. The archive was housed successively in various locations including old churches in places that included Pistoia, Iglesias, Genoa, Canosa and Cecina. The Archivio Famiglia Berneri-Chessa ("Berneri-Chesso Family Archive") which has been accommodated in the Biblioteca Panizzi (Panizzi Library) at Reggio Emilia since 1998.

Aurelio Chessa died in 1996 and his daughter, Fiamma Chessa, took on the task of curating the archive her father had accumulated and created.
