= Italian Anarchist Communist Union =

Italian Anarchist Union Unione Anarchica Italiana
- Leader: Errico Malatesta
- Founded: April 1919
- Dissolved: November 1926
- Preceded by: Socialist Revolutionary Anarchist Party
- Succeeded by: Italian Anarchist Federation
- Headquarters: Milan
- Newspaper: Umanità Nova
- Ideology: Anarcho-communism
- Political position: Far-left

The Italian Anarchist Communist Union (Italian: Unione comunista anarchica italiana, UCAI), or Italian Anarchist Union (Unione anarchica italiana, UAI), was an Italian political organization founded in Florence in 1919. It played an important role during the unrest of the Red Biennium, before it was suppressed by the fascist regime in 1926.

== History ==
=== Formation ===
During the great social unrest of 1919 in Italy, the anarchist movement regained strength. In February 1919, the weekly Il Libertario directed by Pasquale Binazzi published the appeal for a congress of Italian anarchists. In a situation in which a revolution seemed to be approaching, it seemed essential to have an adequate organization and strategy.

From 12 to 14 April 1919 about 200 delegates gathered in Florence representing 145 groups from 15 different regions. The birth of the Italian Anarchist Communist Union was deliberated as an ideal continuation of the International Workingmen's Association (IWA) in Italy and of the Anarchist Revolutionary Socialist Party created at the Capolago Congress of 1891.

The return to Italy of Errico Malatesta in December 1919 and the subsequent birth in Milan of the anarchist newspaper Umanità Nova in February 1920, directed by Malatesta himself, gave further impetus to the development of the movement. While the anarchists relied above all on the Italian Workers' Union (USI), directed by Armando Borghi, the attempt to create a revolutionary united front with the Italian Socialist Party (PSI) and the General Confederation of Labour proved to be of little fruit.

=== The Bologna congress (1920) ===
The Union's first Congress was held in Bologna from 1 to 4 July 1920 while the revolt in Ancona was underway, it was attended by delegates from 183 locations representing about 700 groups and almost all the leading exponents of the Italian anarchist movement, like Errico Malatesta, Armando Borghi and Luigi Fabbri.

The associative pact of the organization (which took the definitive name of the Italian Anarchist Union) and the political program drawn up by Malatesta were approved. The strategy of the revolutionary united front was reaffirmed.

=== From the Biennio Rosso to the Biennio Nero ===
The occupation of factories (August-September 1920) represented the moment of maximum revolutionary mobilization during the Red Biennium. The substantial failure of the movement marked the beginning of the judicial repression accompanied by the progressive deployment of fascist violence, against which the anarchists tried to react by participating in the constitution of the Arditi del Popolo and initially trying to relaunch unitary action with the other left-wing forces. The union's third congress, held in Ancona from 1 to 3 November 1921, highlighted the withdrawal of the movement. "In certain places", wrote Umanità Nova, "the groups are completely in prison". However, 120 delegates were present and the UAI appeared to be developing in the South. Given the previous failures, the hypotheses of an alliance with the Italian Socialist Party and the Communist Party of Italy were rejected and a drastically negative judgment was formulated on the Bolshevik dictatorship in Russia, considered as a betrayal of the original revolutionary objectives.

=== The fascist repression ===
After the failure of the 1922 general strike and in the aftermath of the March on Rome, the political action of the UAI became progressively more difficult. Almost all of the libertarian press, including Umanità Nova was suppressed, the entire UAI Correspondence Commission was jailed and hundreds of militants were forced to go underground or take refuge abroad. Even raising funds to support prisoners' families became a crime and the related solidarity committees were dissolved by the authorities. The last attempt to keep a semi-legal anarchist organization alive was established in 1925 by the Reorganizing Commission of the Italian Anarchist Union operating in Milan, but after the implementation of the fascist laws of November 1926, any legal opposition to the regime became impossible.

=== Later developments ===
In the years of the fascist dictatorship, the anarchists were active in the anti-fascist opposition and later in the resistance. In 1945 the Italian Anarchist Federation (FAI) was established which refers to the principles of the Italian Anarchist Union.

== See also ==
- Anarchism in Italy
- Biennio Rosso

== Bibliography ==
- Berti, Giampietro (2003). Errico Malatesta e il movimento anarchico italiano e internazionale (1872-1932) (in Italian). Milan: FrancoAngeli. ISBN 88-464-4934-7. OCLC 718103346.
- Dadà, Adriana (1984). L'anarchismo in Italia: fra movimento e partito (PDF) (in Italian). Milan: Teti. p. 3. OCLC 848325796.
- De Agostini, Mauro; Schirone, Franco (2015). Per la rivoluzione sociale. Gli anarchici nella Resistenza a Milano (1943-1945) (in Italian). Milan: Zero in condotta. ISBN 978-88-95950-40-2. OCLC 910085347.
- La Torre, Placido (2006). "Il congresso dell'UAI nelle carte della Questura e in un resoconto argentino". In Antonelli, Tiziano (ed.). L'Unione anarchica italiana. Tra rivoluzione europea e reazione fascista (in Italian). Milan: Zero in condotta. OCLC 229904515.
- Masini, Pier Carlo (1981). Storia degli anarchici italiani nell'epoca degli attentati (in Italian). Milan: Rizzoli. OCLC 977961370.
- Santarelli, Enzo (1977). Il socialismo anarchico in Italia (in Italian) (2nd ed.). Milan: Feltrinelli. OCLC 152554056.
- Schirone, Franco, ed. (2010). Cronache anarchiche. Il giornale Umanità nova nell'Italia del Novecento (1920-1945) (in Italian). Milan: Zero in condotta. ISBN 978-88-95950-13-6. OCLC 682880218.
