= Italian Anarchist Federation =

Italian anarchist group

- Federazione Anarchica Italiana
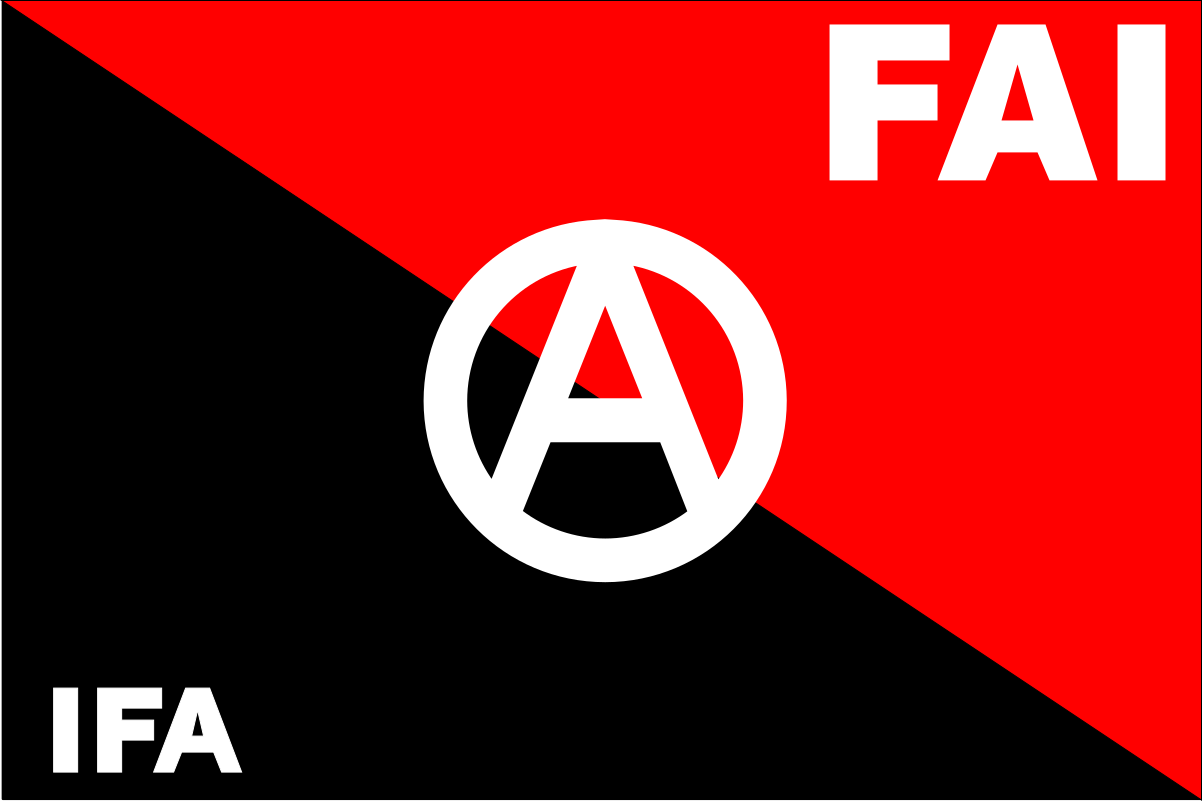
- Abbreviation: FAI
- Formation: 19 September 1945
- Official language: Italian
- Affiliations: International of Anarchist Federations
- Website: www.federazioneanarchica.org

The Italian Anarchist Federation (Italian: Federazione Anarchica Italiana) is an Italian political organization composed of autonomous anarchist groups operating all over Italy. It is a member of the International of Anarchist Federations since the latter's establishment in 1968.

Founded in 1945 in Carrara, the FAI took it upon itself to carry on the legacy of the defunct Italian Anarchist Communist Union, suppressed in 1926 by the fascist regime, and of Italian anarchist Errico Malatesta. It is the current publisher of Umanità Nova, an anarchist newspaper originally founded by Malatesta.

== History ==
In the years following the end of World War II, there was a resurgence of anarchism (and, particularly, anarcho-syndicalism) in Italy. On 19 September 1945, an anarchist congress was held in Carrara, subsequently referred to as the First Anarchist Congress, and the Italian Anarchist Federation (FAI) was officially established.

In the early years of its existence, a fringe group within the FAI emerged, led by Pier Carlo Masini. It supported the idea of "a libertarian party with anarchist theories and practices", meant to adapt to the new economic, political and social realities of post-WW2 Italy, with an internationalist outlook and focusing on an effective presence in workplaces. Masini would go on to found the Gruppi Anarchici di Azione Proletaria (Anarchist Groups of Proletarian Action) in 1951, an organization which aligned itself with a similar development within the French anarchist movement, the Federation Communiste Libertaire (Libertarian Communist Federation) led by Georges Fontenis.

During the Eighth Anarchist Congress, held in Carrara in 1965, an "associative pact" was adopted, with new rules being imposed on FAI members, resulting in a disagreement that culminated in a group of members (led by Pio Turroni and Aurelio Chessa, among others) splitting from the FAI to form their own group, known as the Gruppi d'Iniziativa Anarchica (Groups of Anarchist Initiative), critical of anarcho-syndicalism and favoring individualist anarchism. The GIA published the bi-weekly newspaper L'Internazionale. Another group would later split off from the FAI, known as the Gruppi Anarchici Federati (Federated Anarchist Groups).

In 1968, at an international congress held in Carrara, the FAI, together with the French Anarchist Federation and the Iberian Anarchist Federation, founded the International of Anarchist Federations (IAF-IFA).

In 1985, the FAI created the Archivio Storico della Federazione Anarchica Italiana (ASFAI), an archive located in Imola dedicated to the preservation of flags, letters, books, propaganda and other documents pertaining to the history and origins of the Italian anarchist movement.

On the 23 December 2010, several news sources erroneously reported that the FAI had claimed responsibility for a series of mail bombs delivered to foreign embassies in Rome. Other media outlets attributed the bombs to another group, the insurrectionist Informal Anarchist Federation.

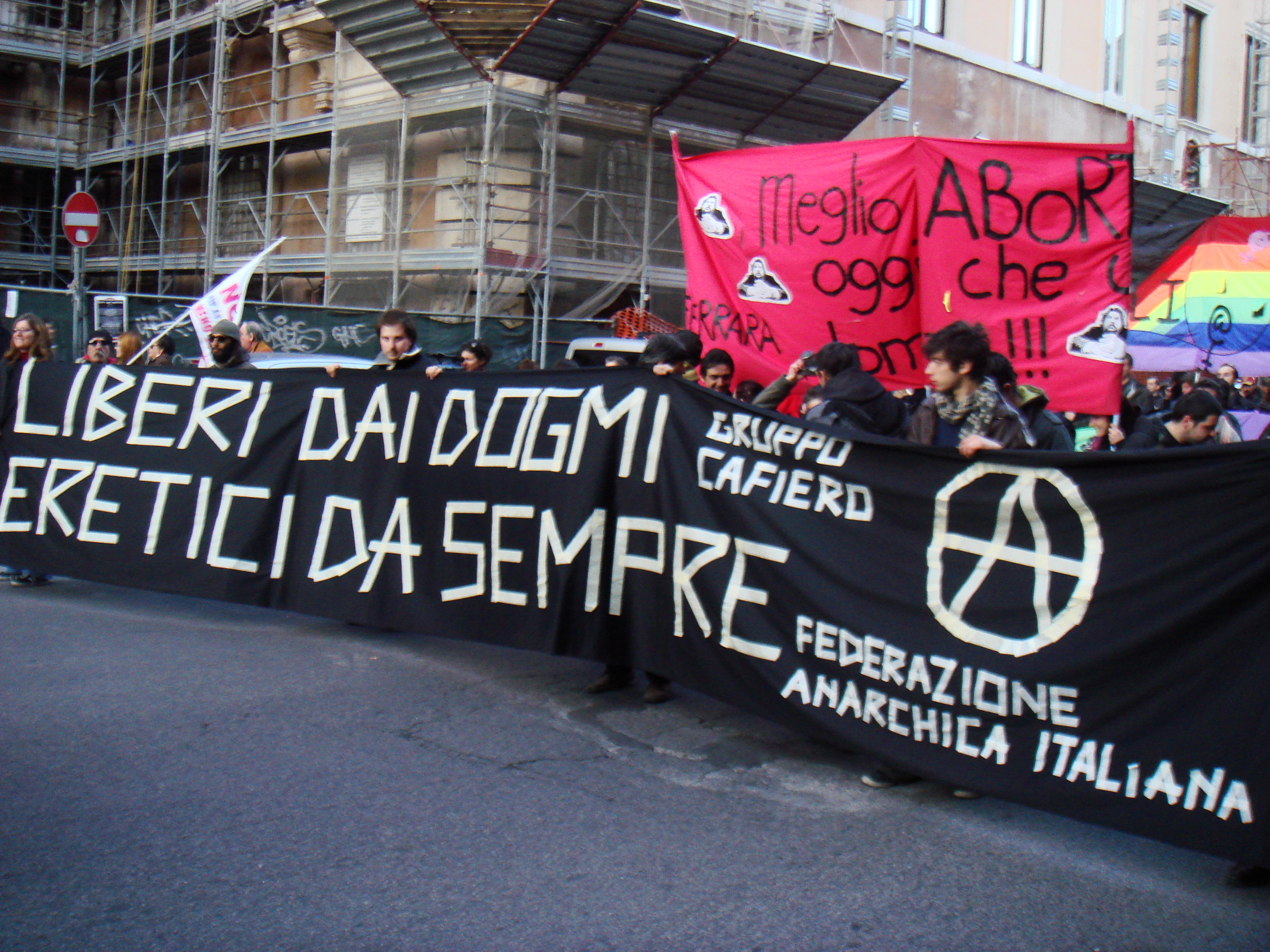
Contemporary members of the Italian Anarchist Federation marching in Rome, 2008.

== See also ==
- Anarchism in Italy
- Anarchist Federation (France)
- Iberian Anarchist Federation
- Argentinian Libertarian Federation
