= Emilia Rensi =

Italian philosopher and teacher (1901–1990)

Emilia Rensi (26 February 1901 – 23 April 1990) was an Italian philosopher, free thinker, writer and teacher. She wrote for anarchist and progressive magazines, such as Flavia Steno's La Chiosa, Volontà (1960s), Umanità Nova (1960s) and Franco Leggio's Sicilia Libertaria (1980s). She began publishing books on social, cultural and ethical subjects from the late 1960s onwards.

== Early life ==
Emilia Rensi was born in Bellinzona, Ticino, Switzerland. Her father was the Italian philosopher Giuseppe Rensi (1871–1941), and her mother was the writer and educationalist Lauretta Perucchi (1873–1966). She had an elder sister, Algisa (1899–1994), who became a nun and abbess. She and her sister were born in Switzerland at the time when their father was living there in exile from Italy following political unrest (he also met his wife there). The family returned to Italy in 1908, living in various cities before settling in Genoa, where Giuseppe taught moral philosophy at the university. There was a strong socialist element in the family as a whole, growing partly out of their experiences during the First World War, which coincided with Emilia's teenage years.

== Work and politics ==
Emilia worked as a teacher at the Liceo Colombo high school in Genoa. She also worked in the Library of the University of Genoa, spending the majority of her adult life there (about sixty years) until shortly before her death. The socialism of father and daughter expressed itself both politically and academically, and put them in a dangerous position during the 1920s and 1930s, as the popularity of the right-wing fascist regime under Benito Mussolini grew, leading up to the Second World War. Giuseppe and Lauretta were arrested and underwent a brief imprisonment in 1930, as punishment for holding left-wing political meetings in their home. There is also an anti-religious, atheistic attitude in the writings of Giuseppe and Emilia, for example in the belief that children's education at school should be entirely secular, and that moral values can be taught without the need for a religious component. In a strongly Roman Catholic society, this was another dangerous position to take, and their work has subsequently been neglected in their own country.

Giuseppe died in 1941, during the Second World War, and was buried in Genoa's Staglieno Cemetery; his widow Lauretta survived him by 25 years. In 1964 Emilia donated a large archive of her father's books, letters and other documents to the State University of Milan. It is interesting to note that Emilia's own books did not begin appear until 1969, three years after her mother's death. From that time onwards her publications appeared regularly, until her death, with some appearing posthumously. Many of her books and articles were published by La Fiaccola [The Torch], founded in 1960 by the left-wing political activist Franco Leggio, and based in Ragusa, Sicily.

== Publications ==
- Chiose laiche [Secular Comments], Ragusa: La Fiaccola, 1969.
- Di contestazione in contestazione [From Dispute to Dispute], Ragusa, Sicily: La Fiaccola, 1971.
- Atei dell'alba [Atheists of the Dawn], Ragusa: La Fiaccola, 1973.
- Dalla parte degli indifesi [On the Side of the Defenceless], Ragusa: La Fiaccola, 1975.
- Il riscatto della persona umana {The Redemption of the Human Person], Catania: Edigraf, 1976.
- L'azzardo della riflessione [The Gamble of Reflection], Ragusa: La Fiaccola, 1976.
- Umanità e sofferenza in Jean Rostand: colloquio [Humanity and Suffering in Jean Rostand: Interview], Ragusa: La Fiaccola, 1981.
- Scuola e libero pensiero [School and Free Thinking], Ragusa: Ipazia, 1984.
- Un uomo, una vicenda: il problema morale nell' antifascismo e nella resistenza [One Man, One Story: The Moral Problem in Anti-fascism and Resistance], Ragusa, 1986.
- Testimonianze inattuali [Outdated Testimonials], Ragusa: La Fiaccola, 1987.
- Frammenti di vita vissuta: e Il "prezzo" della vita: considerazioni e riflessioni contro la guerra e il militarismo [Fragments of Life Lived: and the "Price" of Life: Considerations and Reflections against War and Militarism], Ragusa: Nuova Ipazia, 1991.
- Recensioni come testimonianza: la collaborazione a "Sicilia libertaria": settembre/ottobre 1984-settembre 1990; Dalla parte degli indifesi [Reviews as Testimony: the Collaboration with "Sicilia libertaria": September/October 1984-September 1990; On the Side of the Defenceless], Ragusa: Franco Leggio, 1991.
- Angoscia di vivere [Anguish of Living], Imola, Bologna: Editrice La Mandragora, 1998.

=== Co-authored works ===
- Camillo Berneri and Emilia Rensi, Il cristianesimo e il lavoro: studio inedito 1932 [Christianity and Work: an unpublished study 1932], Genoa: Edizioni RL, 1965.
- Augusto Agabiti, Emilia Rensi and Julian Sorrell Huxley, Ipazia: la prima martire della libertà di pensiero [Hypatia: the First Martyr of Freedom of Thought], Ragusa: Ipazia, 1979.
- Emilia Rensi and Alberto D'Elia, Cristo-Colombo: e ... l'inizio della tratta degli schiavi [Christopher Columbus: and ... The Beginning of the Slave Trade], Ragusa: Nuova Ipazia, 1992.
- Giuseppe Rensi and Emilia Rensi, La religione nella scuola [Religion in School], Ragusa: Fiaccola, 2000.

== Secondary sources ==
Marzia A Coltri, 'Atheism and Free Thought: Some Modern Italian Philosophical Contributions', Literature & Aesthetics, Vol. 30, No. 2, pp159–177, 2020.
