= Howard R. Marraro Prize =

The Howard R. Marraro Prize is a biennial prize given to a writer by the Modern Language Association.

== Description ==
The prize is awarded every second year to honor the author of a scholarly work on Italian literature or comparative Italian literature. The prize is open only to members of the association.

The 2017 prize will be awarded for a book published in 2015 or 2016.

== Notable winners ==
Past winners of the prize include:

- 2023 - Alessandro Giammei, Yale University, for Ariosto in the Machine Age
- 2021 - Martin Eisner, Duke University, for Dante’s New Life of the Book: A Philology of World Literature
- 2019 - Elena Past, Wayne State University, for Italian Ecocinema beyond the Human
- 2017 - Gian Maria Annovi, University of Southern California, for Pier Paolo Pasolini: Performing Authorship
- 2015 - Marilyn Migiel, Cornell University, for The Ethical Dimension of the Decameron
- 2013 - Justin Steinberg, University of Chicago, for Dante and the Limits of the Law
- 2011 - Marco Ruffini, Northwestern University, for Art without an Author: Vasari’s Lives and Michelangelo’s Death
- 2009 - Christine Poggi, University of Pennsylvania, for Inventing Futurism: The Art and Politics of Artificial Optimism; Jane Tylus, New York University, for Reclaiming Catherine of Siena: Literacy, Literature, and the Signs of Others
- 2007 - Diana Robin, Chicago, Illinois, for Publishing Women: Salons, the Press, and the Counter-Reformation in Sixteenth-Century Italy
- 2005 - Christian Moevs, University of Notre Dame, for The Metaphysics of Dante's Comedy
- 2003 - Marilyn Migiel, Cornell University, for A Rhetoric of the Decameron
- 2001 - Ellen V. Nerenberg, Wesleyan University, for Prison Terms: Representing Confinement during and after Italian Fascism
