= Giuseppe Rensi =

Italian philosopher (1871–1941)

Giuseppe Rensi (31 May 1871 in Villafranca di Verona – 14 February 1941 in Genoa) was an Italian philosopher.

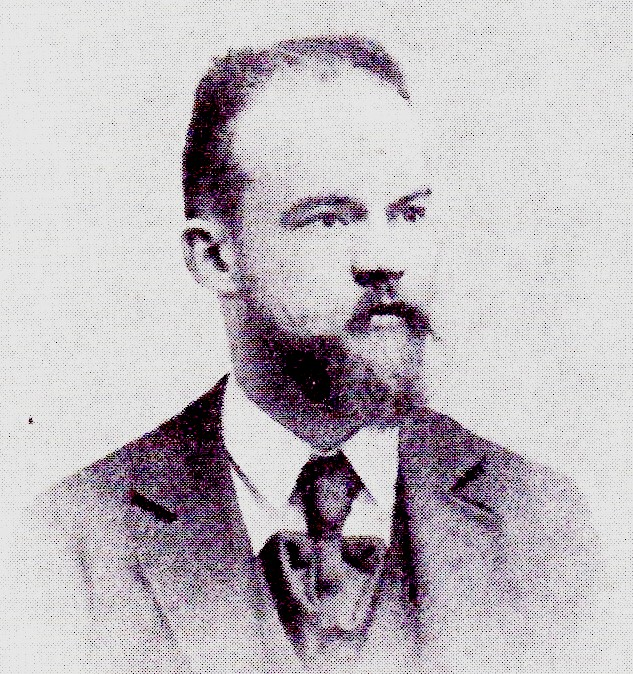
Giuseppe Rensi, Italian philosopher

== Early life and education ==
Giuseppe Rensi's father Gaetano was a doctor; his mother was Emilia Wallner, and he also had a sister, Teresa. He attended high school in Verona, then studied law, first in Padua and then in Rome, where he graduated in 1893. As a young man he began to collaborate on socialist-inspired periodicals, for example the Rivista popolare, directed by Napoleone Colajanni, and the Critica Sociale, directed by Filippo Turati. At Turati's invitation he moved to Milan where he began regularly to frequent socialist circles. He also worked on the periodical La lotta di classe.

== Exile to Switzerland ==
Following the Milan food riots of May 1898 and their aftermath, he was forced to flee to Switzerland. In his absence he was sentenced to 11 years in prison. In 1903 he obtained Swiss citizenship, and became the first socialist deputy in the parliament of the Canton of Ticino. He lived in Bellinzona where he worked as a lawyer and married the teacher and educationalist Lauretta Perucchi (1873-1966). They had two daughters, Emilia and Algisa. He worked with several local newspapers, including Il Dovere, directed by Luigi Colombi, and L’Azione, directed by Carlo Maggini. He was also editor-in-chief of Enrico Bignami's Coenobium.

== Academic work, philosophy and politics ==
On returning to Italy in 1908, he met Benito Mussolini in Como. He then concentrated on his philosophical studies, writing Il genio etico ed altri saggi and La trascendenza un neoidealismo trascendente, influenced by the thinking of the American philosopher Josiah Royce. He was also elected to the municipal and provincial council of Verona. In 1911 he worked as a lecturer in moral philosophy at Bologna, but soon moved to Ferrara where he taught for two years (1913-1914), and then to Florence (1914-1916). After a short stay in Messina he moved permanently to Genoa where he lived in Via Palestro. He taught as a professor at the University of Genoa and was considered a proponent of Relativism and a supporter of the Conservative Revolution in Italy.

His experience of the First World War sent his idealistic convictions into crisis, leading him towards scepticism, as he wrote later in his Intellectual Autobiography of 1939: "It was while I was at the University of Messina, around 1916 ... that I myself acquired full awareness of the sceptical nature of my mind and that the scattered sceptical ingredients always present in my spirit came to merge into a complete and harmonious whole. And what produced this "enlightenment" in me was above all the war". The first theoretical formulation of this sceptical line of his thought are the Lineamenti di filosofia scettica of 1919, where he argues that the war has destroyed his optimistic faith in the universality of reason, replacing it with the tragic spectacle of its pluriversity. He set out his thinking on this concept in his Filosofia dell’autorità (1921). Here he argued that, because different world views cannot be reconciled intellectually, there needs to be a single political authority backed by physical force in order to establish order in society. On this ground he was initially a supporter of the then nascent Fascist movement. By 1925, however, with his work Apologia dell'ateismo, he opposed Mussolini and was counted among the supporters of Benedetto Croce, having signed Croce's manifesto against Fascism the same year. After his early sympathy with the fascist regime he had become its opponent, and he recognised how the idealistic doctrine of Giovanni Gentile had become the regime's ideological cover.

From around this time he began to be persecuted by the fascist regime. In 1927 he was suspended from his lectureship on the grounds of incompatibility with the regime; he was temporarily readmitted to teaching, but in 1930 he was arrested together with his wife for political conspiracy (they had been hosting anti-fascist political and philosophical discussions at their home), an arrest which was followed by a brief imprisonment. In 1934, having published further critical writing, he was definitively dismissed from his post, with the loss of his chair of moral philosophy at the University of Genoa. Instead, he was confined to an office in the university library, for the purpose of drafting a Ligurian bibliography.

During these years his intellectual production became fragmented and took mainly the form of a diary (Scheggie, 1930, Impronte, 1931; Cicute, 1931; Sguardi, 1932; Scolii, 1934; Frammenti di una filosofia dell’errore e del dolore, del male e della morte, 1937). Other writings from this time were the Paradossi d’estetica e Dialoghi dei morti (1937), Autobiografia intellettuale. La mia filosofia. Testamento filosofico (1939), Lettere spirituali (1943) and Sale della vita. Saggi filosofici (1951).

== Death and legacy ==
Rensi died on 14 February 1941 from complications following abdominal surgery, and is buried in the Staglieno cemetery in Genoa. In a reference to his oppositional stance, written upon his tombstone are the Latin words: "Etiam si omnes, ego non".

His daughter Emilia Rensi (1901-1990) was a well-known free thinker, writer and teacher in her own right. She worked on anarchist magazines, for example Volontà and Sicilia Libertaria, and published many philosophical books on the subjects of socialism, anarchism and atheism. She donated her father's extensive archive of books, letters and other documents to the State University of Milan in 1964. Her sister Algisa (1899-1994) became a nun, and eventually abbess, living in the convent of Lugo di Romagna until her death.

== Publications ==
- — (1912). Il genio etico ed altri saggi [The ethical genius and other essays] (in Italian). Bari: Laterza, Giuseppe & figli. OCLC 799589403.
- — (1914). La trascendenza [The transcendence a transcendent neo-idealism] (in Italian). Torino: Bocca. OCLC 251956662.
- — (1919). Lineamenti di filosofia scettica [Outlines of Sceptical Philosophy]. Bologna. pp. xlvi, 314. OCLC 503717559.
- — (2013). La filosofia dell'autorità [Philosophy of Authority] (in Italian). Milano: La vita felice. ISBN 978-88-7799-491-2. OCLC 898683711.
- —; Emery, Nicola (2013). Apologia dell'ateismo [Apology for Atheism] (in Italian). Roma: Castelvecchi. ISBN 978-88-7615-993-0. OCLC 874207511.
- — (1930). Scheggie: (pagine d'un diario intimo) [Splinters] (in Italian). Rieti: Bibliotheca editrice. OCLC 849169385.
- — (1931). Impronte: pagine di diario [Fingerprints] (in Italian). Genova: Libreria editrice Italia. OCLC 875196437.
- — (1931). Cicute: dal diario d'un filosofo [Hemlock] (in Italian). Todi: Editrice Atanòr. OCLC 878363315.
- — (1932). Sguardi: pagine di diario [Glances] (in Italian). Roma: "La Laziale" Editrice. OCLC 636362800.
- — (1934). Scolii: (pagine di diario) [Annotations] (in Italian). Torino: Edizioni Montes. OCLC 878004448.
- — (1937). Frammenti d'una Filosofia dell'Errore e del Dolore del Male e della Morte [Fragments of a Philosophy of Error and Pain, Evil and Death] (in Italian). Modena: Guanda. OCLC 30672969.
- — (1937). Frammenti di una filosofia dell'errore [Paradoxes of Aesthetics and Dialogues of the Dead] (in Italian). OCLC 439932348.
- — (1939). Autobiografia intellettuale [Intellectual Autobiography, My Philosophy, Philosophical Testament] (in Italian). Milano: Corbaccio. OCLC 251264217.
- — (1943). Lettere spirituali [Spiritual Letters] (in Italian). Milano: Fratelli Bocca. OCLC 20729923.
- — (1951). Sale della vita: saggi filosofici [The Salt of Life. Philosophical Essays] (in Italian). Milano: Dall'Oglio. OCLC 799595081.
