= Umanità Nova =

Italian anarchist newspaper

- Type: weekly
- Format: print and web
- Publisher: c/o la coop. Tipolitografica, via S. Piero 13/A 54033 Carrara (MS)
- Editor-in-chief: Associazione Umanità Nova Reggio Emilia
- Managing editor: Giorgio Sacchetti
- Founded: 1920
- Language: Italian
- Price: € 1.50
- Website: umanitanova.org

Umanità Nova is an Italian anarchist newspaper founded in 1920.

It was published daily until 1922 when it was shut down by the fascist regime. In some places, its circulation exceeded that of the socialist paper Avanti! Upon the fall of the regime in 1945, the publication began again, this time weekly.

The paper continues today, and Umanità Nova is the mouthpiece of the Italian Anarchist Federation.

Contributors to Umanità Nova include its founders, Errico Malatesta and Antonio Cieri; Camillo Berneri, Armando Borghi, Carlo Frigerio and Emilia Rensi.

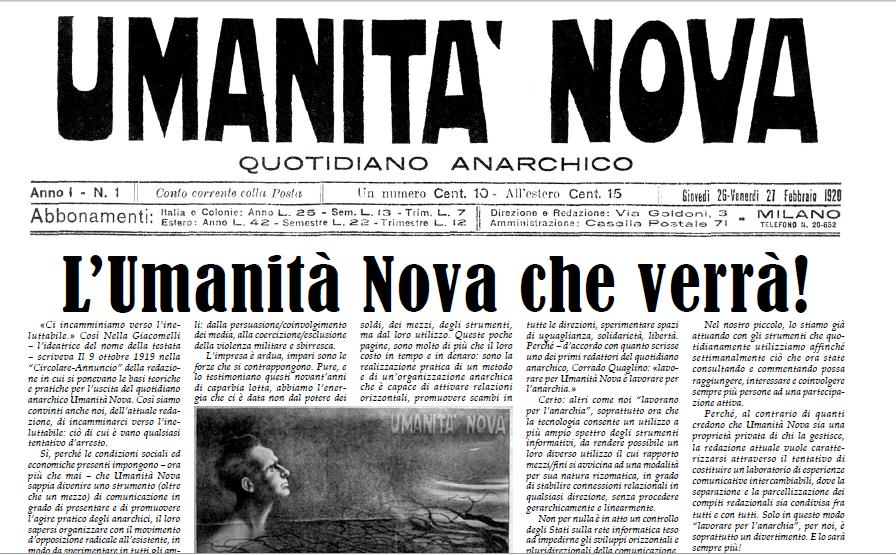
reconstruction of Umanità Nova's first issue

== History ==
=== Early years ===
The paper was begun in 1909 by Ettore Molinari and Nella Giacomelli, who thought to turn the pamphlet "Human Protest" (La Protesta Umana) into a daily journal. During a national convention in 1911, the Rome Anarchist Communist Group proposed a national outlet to reach the movement outside the country, and in turn, reinforce it within Italy. In April 1919, a large gathering of Italian anarchists, both organizationalists and individualists, attended a national convention in Florence and agreed upon the need to close ranks and form a union together: the Italian Anarchist Communist Union. One of the main resolutions was to print a paper, and when Molinari and Giacomelli proposed it to be published as a national daily, they and Emilio Spinaci were given the responsibility of determining whether it was possible to accomplish the feat of getting all the anarchists together, and began gathering the funds.

Nella Giacomelli gave the paper its present name, saying,

" 'Umanità Nova' is the title of the anarchist daily we are planning — a mild name, almost evangelical, out of tune, some say, with the quick breath of a society in turmoil, with the jolting events, the threat of violent action and the bold daring of this time that we live in. [....] Umanità Nova! : it embraces the full meaning of our highest hopes, and it sets a path to follow without fail. [....] We are setting out for the inevitable. The revolution is no longer a dream; libertarian communism is an achievable goal; the anarchic ideal is no longer a utopia. The cry of the masses, pouring from the workshops, and the salt of endless, fertile fields, represents the greatest human protest against secular human suffering; Spartacus is about to break his chains; many consciousnesses will rise to renew the world. Umanità Nova, the supreme goal of all our battles and our pain, we adopt you as a shining symbol of a living vision, and we raise you up to the masses, to all our hearts, to the lantern and the flag of light and freedom."

Due to a blockade of the funds, delays in the post, and a decree placing a quota on paper, to the downfall of new journals, the publication was only possible thanks to an intervention by the workers of the lignite caves of Valdarno who supplied the energy for paper-mills, sending word that they would refuse to make any more deliveries until there was a guarantee to supply paper to Umanità Nova. October 9, 1919, a notice was printed that the daily paper would be prepared, and funds began to arrive: about 200,000 lira were dedicated to bringing it to life. So, on February 26, 1920, the first issue of Umanità Nova was released, an evening edition of four pages, ten cents cover price. 9,000 copies of the first edition grew to 40,000 within a month and 50,000 in a heated moment, and if more weren't printed, it was only because of the lack of paper. Its cash pool exceeded a million lira.

The success of the paper reflected not only on the anarchist movement but on a vast segment of the left, which was now contiguous with the movement and would remain so for several months until the failure of the factory occupations, which happened to turn it away. The bold political line the anarchists held is speculated to have helped them grow in numbers and importance. The Congress of Florence in 1919 had 145 in attendance in July 1920, and the meeting in Bologna attracted about 700. In the syndicalist camp, the Italian Syndicalist Union (USI) went from 58,000 members by the end of 1919 to more than 180,000 in the first half of 1919 and 300,000 the following year. Among the Confederation, the anarchists took key administrative reformists such as the FIOM of Turin, with Pietro Ferrero and Maurizio Garino. Furthermore, the efficacy was shown in the course of the imposing "factory occupation" movement among the workers. In October, almost the entire editorship of "Umanità Nova" was arrested, in the hundreds of arrests and searches carried out all across Italy, against anarchists and revolutionary syndicalists, and the USI was beheaded by the arrest of the entire General Council.

However, the police could not figure out how the newspaper was still issued every day, with its editors in jail. The dragnet had not captured Gigi Damiani, who contacted individuals who had gone underground and avoided the wave of repression, and who had created a network which allowed it to move continuously. The newspaper was compiled this way, eventually reaching Milan, where it was published regularly.

=== Censorship, harassment, and closure ===
On February 29, 1920, there was a rally in Milan, in the Porta Romana school gym, organized by the Proletarian League of injured and disabled veterans. Leftists and trade unionists took part, including the anarchist Errico Malatesta, and Pasquale Binazzi and Armando Borghi's Italian Syndicalist Union (USI). The peaceful demonstration turned out to be tragic anticipation of the fascist attack squads in the two years which followed. Protesters were repeatedly charged by the police, who fired on a train carrying demonstrators and killed two, wounding five others. With fascists supporting the ordinary police forces, the number of leaders in the anarchist movement shrank from 28 in 1921 to 3 in 1926. The history of Umanità Nova — its daily publication in Milan interrupted by the Diana event, moving to Rome where it became weekly and irregular until its final closure in 1922 — is thoroughly documented in a special dossier of the Directorate-General of Public Security. It began as an ambitious publishing accomplishment led by Malatesta, having a hugely successful subscription drive leading up to its first issue (135,000 lira of "funds collected in the Kingdom" by January 1920). Copies reserved in advance (6 lira for 100 copies), then the promotion, lotteries and house parties, and the establishment of "Committees for Umanità Nova" everywhere. The final act came when the police headquarters in Rome filed a complaint against twenty former editors, correspondents, and members of the board of directors of Umanità Nova. A large pile of correspondence, pamphlets, and propaganda was seized. The newspaper's assets are taken: 5,700 lira, 300 marks, 20,000 crowns, and a checking account at Credito Italiano with 71,328 lira available, plus all their records. A similar situation took place in La Spezia, where the Blackshirts had destroyed the printing press and burned the offices of Il Libertario, and with L'Avvenire Anarchico in Pisa. On October 28, 1922, the king Vittorio Emanuele III entrusted Benito Mussolini with the "task of forming a new government." Umanità Nova has this to say about his decision to give power to the executive head of the blackshirts:

"The bourgeoisie, threatened by the rising sea of workers, incapable of solving the urgent problems of war, and powerless to defend themselves with traditional methods of legal repression, saw themselves as lost, and greeted with joy a soldier who was proclaimed dictator and who had drowned every attempted uprising in blood."

— "The Parliamentary Swindle," July 21, 1922.

Umanità Nova also places responsibility on the socialists for helping the fascists' political ascent:

"The rise of fascism should serve as a lesson to the legislative socialists, who believed and — alas! — still believe that we can overthrow the bourgeoise with the votes of 51% of the electorate, and they would not believe us when we told them that should they ever achieve the parliamentary majority they so desired (just to make the absurd point: a socialist parliament), they would have gotten their asses kicked!

— "Mussolini gains power," November 25, 1922.

Immediately following the fascist occupation of Rome, on October 30, 1922, the offices on Via Santa Croce in Milan were invaded and destroyed. After three weeks of forced silence, on November 22, they found a printer willing to publish the paper. While the devastating fury of the blackshirts raged, issue number 196 of Umanità Nova was released. It would be the last.

=== New beginnings, abroad ===
The Italian experiment ended by force, Umanità Nova was reborn in Brooklyn, the US, between 1924 and 1925. Eighteen issues were published under the new editor Maris Baldini, a publicist. There are passionate articles about the fight against fascism and the campaign to free Sacco and Vanzetti. Many interventions and analyses appeared on the Italian situation and the role of anarchists in this phase: some important and interesting writings by Camillo da Lodi (a pseudonym of Camillo Berneri), A. Borghi, Luigi Fabbri, and others. The American edition of the journal immediately found a large following among exile communities, and the first issues sold out completely. Two special issues of Umanità Nova were published in Buenos Aires in 1930 and 1932. From October 20, 1932, to April 15, 1933, ten issues were published from Puteaux: Camillo Berneri and Antonio Cieri, and several free exiles, are the architects of the journal's rebirth as a biweekly. Its trajectory is a history of repression by French authorities. The international scope of Umanità Nova reaches Russia and Spain in particular; in its new social environment, the paper entered a new phase; its authors desired that it become a paper with international horizons, opening a window onto workers' struggles in each country. The first months of 1933 are full of events of international importance. In January, there was an anarchist uprising in Spain, which ended in the arrest, torture, and assassination of rebels in the Iberian Anarchist Federation, and Germany, Hitler came to power, resulting in censorship of the press, restriction of the freedom of association, and repression of the Nazi's opponents. At this moment of critical social importance to the exiles, France ordered Umanità Nova to be shut down again. Only three issues of La Protesta exist. The last is dated March 28, 1933. The newspaper appeared again, illegally, in Italy in 1943, fulfilling the dream of Camillo Berneri.

=== World War II and Resistance ===
After ten years of forced silence, Umanità Nova was published by the underground once again, under the title "Risorgiamo" (Resurrection), on September 10, 1943. Between September 1943 and October 1944, articles were written not simple with only the intention of forming solidarity with oppressed subjects, but with the political purpose of urging a fight against fascism. The warning to "concede nothing" in the partisan fight came from this open letter to women, almost a political manifesto:

And to succeed in this battle, we will fight alongside men, never conceding anything, never yielding, so that our children can live in a time in which men can truly be men.

Reestablishment of political parties, demonstrations, and freedom of the press continued to be banned and repressed. The mood engendered by these circumstances and the growing demands of workers returning from the war, in the great strikes that had closed factories in Naples from August 17–20, 1943, just before the city successfully resisted the Nazi occupation, can be read in anti-fascist papers, from the communist l'Unità to the socialist Avanti!, from the actionist L'Italia libera to the anarchist Umanità Nova. Additional concrete suggestions and analysis appears in the article "Fascists and Nazis at work," interesting because it turns the favorite formula of treason used by Nazi propaganda on its head:

The Fascist leadership, responsible for the ruin of Italy, taking advantage of the weakness of the Badoglio government, have taken refuge in Germany among their worthy comrades, the Nazis, murderers of the German people, and from there come radio instructions ordering the Italian squads to aid the [occupying] Germans in any way, to help Fascism to take power again [...] There is no historical example of a more vile treachery against the Italian people, who are reduced to homelessness and complete loss.

— "Fascists and Nazis at work," Umanità Nova

After the collapse of Fascism in July 1943, and the Armistice that September, the Italian Anarchist Federation (FAI) took over management and publication of the paper. It took on many of the characteristics of that group's libertarian philosophy: internal organization is not absolute and rigid, but is shaped by the mandates of a congress, who also establish the editorial motifs; an extensive network of frequent collaborators is recognized, any of its readers can have an exchange with the paper, with the effect that very occasional collaborators publish a substantial number of articles; there is absolute freedom to choose the topic to be covered; distribution is left largely to the talents of militants. The circulation data is interesting, although quite difficult to reconstruct. The paper's spread was closely related to the native anarchist movement in each area and the different phases of the evolving Italian political and social situation. With some guesswork, we see that circulation rose from 13,000 in 1944, to an average of 15–16,000 copies per issue, up to a peak of 18,000, reached in 1946, then gradually decreasing to 10,000-10,500 copies in the early 1950s. Approximately 60% of revenue was from direct sales, while subscriptions accounted for at most 15%. The range of its greatest distribution was historically more consolidated: Tuscany, Lazio, and Emilia-Romagna.

=== Present ===
A congress of the FAI currently appoints the editorship and management, and its members rotate every three years unless there are exceptional circumstances. The rotation of offices, used for every post in the FAI, helps prevent any power concentration. Umanità Nova is printed weekly at a shop in self-managed Carrara and distributed throughout Italy, among anarchist groups and headquarters, libraries, community centers, newsstands, and bookstores abroad. A complete list of outlets can be found on the magazine's website. It is also distributed in pdf format.

The newspaper is a weekly issue and publishes around 35 issues per year. Its articles cover the themes of workers' struggles, antimilitarism, feminism, social-ecologism, antispecism, and internationalism. Umanità Nova also publishes translations from foreign anarchist websites and newspapers, most notably from Le Monde Libertaire (France), LibCom.org, CrimethInc.com, Tierra y Libertad (Spain), and Meydan (Turkey). On the occasion of international anarchist and anarcho-sindacalists meetings and congress, the newspaper covers the events with long-form articles and interviews of members of other organizations.

It hosts thematic debates developed in several issues about the political and more theoretical question. In the Italian anarchist milieu, the editorial board is known for its hardcore scientific, classist, internationalist, and anti-primitivist views, which lead to several polemics with "anarcho"-primitivist and "post-anarchist" groups and individuals.

== See also ==
- Anarchism in Italy
- Arditi del Popolo
