= Parma Barricades =

1922 anti-fascist confrontation in Italy

- Part of Fascist and anti-Fascist violence in Italy (1919–1926)
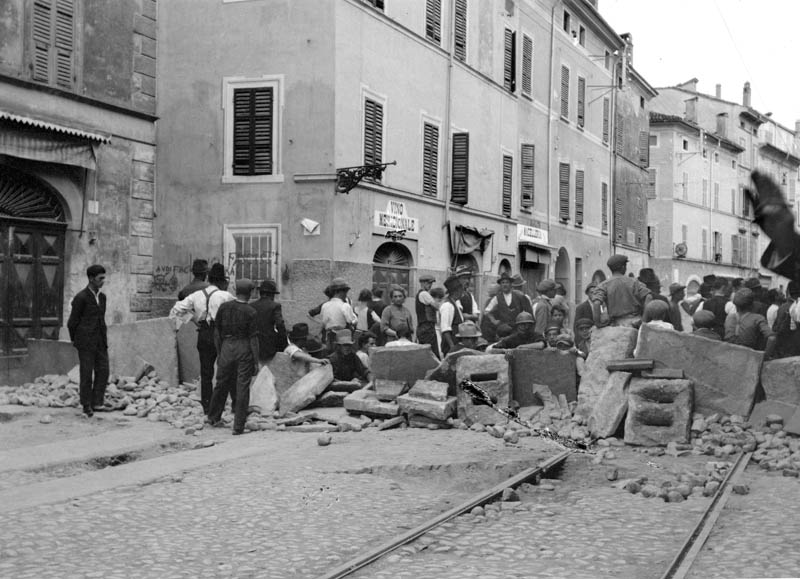
- One of the barricades, in Nino Bixio street
- Date: 1 August–14 October 1922
- Location: Parma
- Result: Arditi del Popolo victory and eventual Army interference

Parties
Arditi del Popolo	Fascist Squadristi

Lead figures
Guido Picelli; Antonio Cieri	Italo Balbo; Roberto Farinacci

Number
~350	10,000 - 20,000

Casualties and losses
Deaths: 3	Deaths: ~40

The Parma Barricades (Barricate di Parma), also known as the siege of Parma, were a series of battles between anti-fascist forces of the Arditi del Popolo and the Proletarian Defense Formations against the fascist Squadristi in August 1922.

== History ==
=== Background ===
On 31 July 1922, the Alleanza del Lavoro, a union of those who were left-wing trade unions before the advent of the regime, called a legal strike "against fascist violence" and "the indifference of the state towards them". The news leaked ahead of time and Mussolini was able to organize an early resistance by sending a very secret circular to all the federations of the National Fascist Party (PNF):

If the government fails to crush it within forty-eight hours from the proclamation of the strike, the fascists will provide for the need directly. The fascists must, after the aforementioned period of forty-eight hours, and provided that the strike persists, aim at the capitals of their respective provinces and occupy them."

Meanwhile, in Parma the workers joined the strike in force. The Arditi del Popolo and the local Proletarian Legion Filippo Corridoni created a front including the left-wing interventionists from Parma. The Parmesan revolutionary syndicalists approached the left, highlighting the difficulties of fascism in finding consensus in Parma, as shown in the diaries of Italo Balbo. For just over a year, the proletarian defense formations of Guido Picelli, an internationalist socialist, had also been present, who had a recruiting tank in the Parma proletariat. inclined to radical socialism and anarchism.

Here an armed resistance "of excellent military caliber" was organized, according to Italo Balbo, sent by Michele Bianchi, at the request of the fascist deputy Terzaghi, the local quadrunvirate, close to Roberto Farinacci's positions.

=== Battle of Parma ===
In the first days of August, therefore, about 10,000 men were mobilized by the PNF for the occupation of Parma, coming from the towns of the Parma area and the neighboring provinces. After a brief command entrusted to the quadrunvirate formed by Alcide Aimi, Giovanni Botti, Gino Caramatti and Giuseppe Stefanini, the command was passed to Italo Balbo. The number of squads was increased considerably with reinforcements that occurred, precisely because of the resistance opposed by the Proletarian Defense Formations, which increased their ability to repel attacks.

The whole population actively participated in the clashes, including the women who gave a fundamental contribution both as fighters and for the organization of the rear, and for this reason were praised by Balbo himself.

The squadristi tried to overcome the barricades, devastating, in the central areas of the city, less defensible and defended, the railway workers' club, offices of numerous democratic professionals, the offices of the newspaper Il Piccolo, the Union of Labor and the People's Party.

On 6 August, also on the advice of the military officer in command of the local Military Application School, Lodomez, the PNF realized the impossibility of conquering the city without unleashing a total war, which would have caused carnage, the fascists passed control of public order to the army, pledging to withdraw. During the midnight on 5 August, the state of military siege had entered into force.

The population of the Oltretorrente and of the Naviglio and Saffi districts prepared for the aggression, building barricades and digging trenches under the command of the anarchist Antonio Cieri, wanting to defend to the bitter end the headquarters of the proletarian and centrist organizations knowing the devastation that the fascists had done in other places, as in the Ravenna, led by Italo Balbo. While at the national level the strike ended in complete failure, in Parma the idea of resisting takes root more and more. In the popular districts the institutional powers were passed to the Arditi del Popolo directorate commanded by Guido Picelli.

The Naviglio district was occupied by the army (Novara Cavalleria) on 4 August following an agreement between the prefect Fusco and Balbo. The state of military siege was instituted by the government starting from midnight on 5 August in all the cities where unrest still persisted following the general strike proclaimed starting from 1 August and officially ending on 3 August. The cities declared in a state of siege, in addition to Parma, were: Ancona, Livorno, Genoa and Rome. On 6 August Lodomez, military commander of the square, assumed full powers and put an end to the battles.

However, the siege of Parma persisted for three more months. The battle only ended on 14 October when Benito Mussolini ordered the Squadristi to demobilize in Parma, having already suffered numerous losses during the duration of the siege.

== Bibliography ==
- AA.VV., Dietro le barricate, Parma 1922, testi immagini e documenti della mostra (30 aprile - 30 maggio 1983), edizione a cura del Comune e della Provincia di Parma e dell'Istituto storico della Resistenza per la Provincia di Parma
- AA.VV., Pro Memoria. La città, le barricate, il monumento, scritti in occasione della posa del monumento in ricordo alle barricate del 1922, edizione a cura del Comune di Parma, Parma, 1997
- Alberghi, Pietro, Il fascismo in Emilia-Romagna: dalle origini alla marcia su Roma, Modena, Mucchi, 1989.
- Le Barricate a Parma 1/5 agosto 1922, numero monografico di “PR. Parma Realtà”, n. 15, dicembre 1972.
- Balestrini, Nanni, Parma 1922. Una resistenza antifascista, a cura di Margherita Becchetti, Giovanni Ronchini e Andrea Zini, Roma, DeriveApprodi, 2002.
- Biacchessi, Daniele.Orazione civile per la Resistenza, Bologna, Promomusic, 2012.
- Bocchi Giancarlo, Il Ribelle Guido Picelli una vita da rivoluzionario, Roma, IMPLIBRI , 2013
- Bonardi, Pietro, La violenza del 1922 nel Parmense, Parma, Centro studi della Val Baganza, 1992.
- Bottioni, Graziano, La nascita del PCI a Parma 1921-1926, Parma, Biblioteca “Umberto Balestrazzi”, 1981.
- Brunazzi, Luciana, Parma nel primo dopoguerra 1919-1920, Parma, Istituto storico della resistenza per la provincia di Parma, 1981.
