= Argo Secondari =

Italian anarchist and anti-fascist (1895–1942)

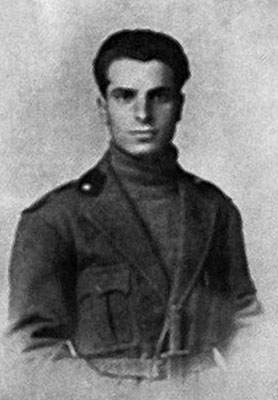
- Argo Secondari in Arditi uniform, 1917
- Born: 12 September 1895; Rome, Kingdom of Italy
- Died: 17 March 1942 (aged 46); Rieti, Kingdom of Italy
- Occupation: Soldier
- Organization: Arditi del Popolo
- Movement: Anarchism; Anti-fascism

Argo Secondari (12 September 1895 – 17 March 1942) was an Italian anarchist and militant anti-fascist and one of the founders of the anti-fascist group Arditi del Popolo.

== Biography ==
=== Early life ===
Secondari was born to a large middle-class family. His father Giuseppe was among the first Italian homeopaths and Giovanni Giolitti's doctor. At a very young age, he embarked as a hub for a ship bound for South America. He returned to Italy to enlist as a soldier during the First World War. Starting as a simple soldier, he reached the rank of lieutenant in a battalion of the Arditi and was decorated with three medals for military valor.

=== Leader of the Arditi del Popolo ===
On 22 June 1921, Argo Secondari convened a general assembly of members and sympathizers, which saw heated debates between supporters of fascism and anti-fascists. It was also decided to form the Arditi del Popolo association, of which Secondari published the first poster in the press. At a subsequent meeting on 27 June 1921, the new Directory was elected, a triad of which Secondari was president together with Lieutenant Ferrari and Sergeant Major Pierdominici. During the assembly, it was decided to create a Battalion of the Arditi del Popolo, whose task was to defend the seats hit by squadristi violence. The Battalion was immediately supported by the Proletarian defense Formations, which came to be set up in response to the Fasci Italiani di Combattimento and was initially named Association of the Arditi del Popolo.

The public presentation of the Arditi del Popolo took place on 6 July 1921. On the occasion of the anti-fascist rally, organized by the Proletarian Defense Committee, at the Botanical Garden of Rome, Secondari, at the head of the Arditi, paraded through the crowd in ovation, in a march attended by about two thousand people. After the March on Rome on 31 October 1922, Secondari was attacked by some fascists armed with clubs who, repeatedly hitting him on the head, caused him a concussion. Secondari never recovered from the attack, and he suffered so much so that he had to move to Camerino with his brother Biante.

=== Later life and death ===
On 20 June 1924, as described by a report from the Rome commissioner in 1931, he bears signs of mental imbalance for which he was hospitalized in the psychiatric hospital of Camerino. Later he was transferred to the asylum of Montefiascone and was finally interned permanently in the asylum of Rieti. His brother Epaminonda, a cardiologist in the United States, tried in vain to have him be expatriated in order to be able to treat him, but the fascist regime always refused permission.

Secondari remained in the asylum of Rieti for eighteen years until 17 March 1942, where he died at the age of forty-six. His funeral by order of the police, which feared the occurrence of unrest, took place in private. Secondari is buried in the monumental cemetery of Rieti.
