= Antonio Cieri =

Italian anarchist and antifascist militant

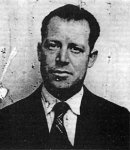
- Born: 11 November 1898; Vasto, Kingdom of Italy
- Died: 7 April 1937 (aged 38) near Huesca, Spain
- Military career
- Units: Arditi del Popolo (1921-1923); Ascaso Column (1936-1937)
- Known for: Being a founding member of the Arditi del Popolo and the Umanità Nova newspaper, possibly being executed by Stalinists
- Conflicts: World War I Fascist and anti-Fascist violence in Italy (1919–1926): Parma Barricades; Spanish Civil War

Antonio Cieri (11 November 1898 – 7 April 1937) was an Italian anarchist and anti-fascist militant. A founding member of the Arditi del Popolo, he fought and died during the Spanish Civil War.

== Biography ==
Cieri was born in Vasto, Italy. During World War I, he received the Bronze Medal of Military Valor for his role in keeping alive the army telecommunications.

He was an activist in the anarchist movement of Ancona, where he was employed by the State Railways as a technical designer. In 1921, he was transferred to Parma due to his political activity. There, during the Parma Barricades, in August 1922 together with Guido Picelli, who directed the entire anti-fascist formation, he was commander of the Arditi del Popolo in the defence of the Naviglio, a popular district of Parma, against the assaults of Italo Balbo's fascist squads.

In 1923, he was fired from the State Railways and went into exile. In Paris, he resumed his activity as a militant anarchist by publishing the periodical Umanità Nova.

In 1936, he left to participate in the Italian Section of the Ascaso Column for the Republican side in the Spanish Civil War. On 7 April 1937, he died during an assault against the Nationalist-held Huesca. There were suspicions that during the battle he was killed from the back by Stalinists of the Republican faction, and not by the "official" enemies.

== Commemoration ==
Parma dedicated a square to him in 1984. A plaque in Piazza Rossetti in Vasto has been raised for him.
