= Arditi del Popolo =

Italian militant anti-fascist organization

People's Daring Ones
- Arditi del Popolo
- Battalion flag of the Arditi del Popolo, Civitavecchia section
- Leader: Argo Secondari
- Dates active: 17 June 1921 – 1924
- Split from: Arditi
- Merged into: Italian resistance movement
- Country: Italy
- Ideology: Anti-fascism; Factions: Anarchism; Communism; Republicanism; Socialism; Anti-capitalism; Syndicalism
- Political position: Left-wing to far-left
- Size: 20,000 (1921)

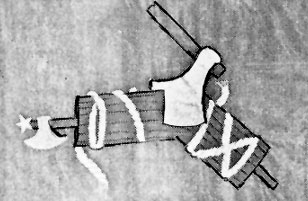
Logo of the Arditi del Popolo, an axe cutting a fasces

The Arditi del Popolo (lit. 'The People's Daring Ones') was an Italian militant anti-fascist group founded at the end of June 1921 to resist the rise of Benito Mussolini's National Fascist Party and the violence of the Blackshirts (squadristi) paramilitaries. It grouped revolutionary trade-unionists, socialists, communists, anarchists, republicans, anti-capitalists, as well as some former military officers, and was co-founded by Giuseppe Mingrino, Argo Secondari and Gino Lucetti – who tried to assassinate Mussolini on 11 September 1926 – the deputy Guido Picelli and others. The Arditi del Popolo were an offshoot of the Arditi elite troops, who had previously occupied Fiume in 1919 behind the poet Gabriele D'Annunzio, who proclaimed the Italian Regency of Carnaro. Those who split to form the Arditi del Popolo were close to the anarchist Argo Secondari and were supported by Mario Carli. The formazioni di difesa proletaria (Proletarian Defense Formations) later merged with them. The Arditi del Popolo gathered approximately 20,000 members in summer 1921.

== Relations with the workers' movement and organized parties ==
Reconstruction of the insignia used by the Arditi del Popolo

Composed of Italian anarchists, socialists, and communists, the Arditi del Popolo were not supported by leftist parties (neither by the Italian Socialist Party, PSI, nor by the Communist Party of Italy, PCd'I). The Arditi were criticized by the socialist newspaper Avanti! on 7 July 1921, following a demonstration in Rome the previous day.

On 10 July 1921, Pravda announced the demonstration and Vladimir Lenin wrote an article the next month praising the Arditi del Popolo as a unified action of the entire proletariat against fascism and criticizing the Bordigan tendency of the PCd'I. (Note: "In Rome, a rally was held to organize the fight against fascism, which was attended by 50,000 workers, representatives of all parties: communists, socialists and even republicans. 5,000 ex-combatants in military uniform went there and not a single fascist dared to be seen in the streets." – V. I. Lenin ('Discorsi alla riunione dei membri delle delegazioni tedesca, polacca, cecoslovacca, ungherese e italiana', vol. XLII, 1968, pp. 306-307)) On 3 August 1921 the PSI signed a "pacification pact" (patto di pacificazione) with Mussolini and his Fasces of Combat on 3 August 1921, while the General Confederation of Labour (CGT) and the PSI refused to officially recognize the anti-fascist militia. Furthermore, the PCd'I ordered its members to quit the organization because of the presence of non-communists in its ranks. The PCd'I organized by themselves some militant groups (the Squadre comuniste d'azione), but their actions were relatively minor and the party kept a non-violent, legalist strategy.

The Bordigan tendency was opposed by the Marxist philosopher Antonio Gramsci, and many communist activists, who supported the Arditi. In October 1921, the Comintern criticized the "sectarian policy" of the PCd'I, who threatened those of its members who supported the Arditi with disciplinary measures. However, after the alignment of Gramsci and of L'Ordine Nuovo to the PCd'I's direction, the anarchist Umanità Nova newspaper remained the sole mouthpiece of the workers' movement which supported the Arditi del Popolo.

== Parma and dismantlement of the group ==
One of the Arditi's most important successes was in Parma during the events known as the Barricades of Parma in August 1922, when 350 arditi, directed by the World War I veterans Antonio Cieri and Guido Picelli, successfully defended the city against a 20,000-man fascist offensive headed by Roberto Farinacci, who would join the Grand Council of Fascism in 1935, and Italo Balbo, one of the four main planners of the March on Rome. The Arditi benefitted from massive popular support in this task.

With the complicity of state security forces, the fascists assassinated and detained most of the leaders of the anti-fascist movement, which was completely dismantled by 1924.

== Legacy ==
Many Arditi del Popolo later joined the International Brigades during the Spanish Civil War (1936–39). The name was also re-used by Resistance during World War II. The communists Antonello Trombadori and Luigi Longo created an organization thus named on 25 July 1943.

The song Siam del Popolo gli Arditi has been written in honor of the group.

== List of notable members ==
- Argo Secondari, anarchist
- Gino Lucetti, anarchist
- Guido Picelli, communist deputy
- Alberto Acquacalda, anarchist (assassinated by Fascists on 11 August 1921)
- Riccardo Lombardi, socialist (not officially a member but a participant)
- Giuseppe Di Vittorio, communist
- Tigrino Sabatini, communist
- Renzo Novatore, anarchist
- Vincenzo Baldazzi, socialist
- Antonio Cieri, anarchist

== See also ==
- Italian fascism

== Bibliography ==
- Tom Behan, The Resistible Rise of Benito Mussolini, Bookmarks, 2003, ISBN 978-1-898876-90-8 (account of the book in Socialist Worker review)
- Iain McKay, The Irresistible Correctness of Anarchism (a review of Behan's book from an anarchist perspective)

Italian language

- Gentili, Valerio, Roma combattente, Roma, Castelvecchi, 2010
- Gentili, Valerio, La legione romana degli Arditi del Popolo, Roma, Purple Press, 2009
- Balsamini, Luigi, Gli Arditi del Popolo. Dalla guerra alla difesa del popolo contro le violenze fasciste, Casalvelino Scalo, Galzerano, 2002.
- Francescangeli, Eros, Arditi del Popolo. Argo Secondari e la prima organizzazione antifascista (1917-1922), Roma, Odradek, 2000.
- Rossi, Marco, Arditi, non gendarmi! Dall'arditismo di guerra agli arditi del popolo 1917-1922, Pisa, BFS, 1997.
- Fuschini, Ivan, Gli Arditi del Popolo, prefazione di Arrigo Boldrini, Ravenna, Longo, 1994.
- Cordova, Ferdinando, Arditi e legionari dannunziani, Padova, Marsilio, 1969.
