= Ottavio Pastore =

Italian politician and journalist (1887–1965)

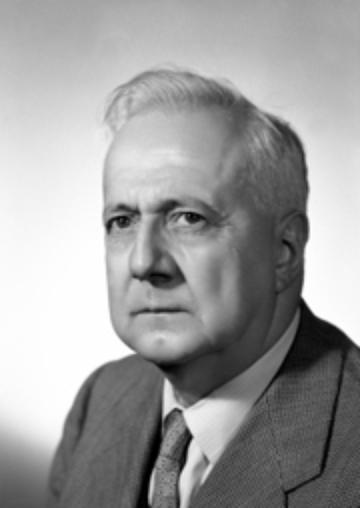
- Pastore in 1948

Member of the Senate
- In office 8 May 1948 – 15 May 1963

Personal details
- Born: 15 July 1887 La Spezia, Kingdom of Italy
- Died: 25 June 1965 (aged 77) Rome, Italy
- Party: PCI
- Other political affiliations: PSI (1902–1921)
- Occupation: Journalist

Ottavio Pastore (15 July 1887 – 25 June 1965) was an Italian communist politician and journalist.

== Biography ==
=== Early career ===
A supporter of socialism since his teenage years, Pastore joined the Federation of Young Socialists in 1902. In 1903, he founded and directed the periodical La nuova parola. In 1912, he moved to Turin and in 1914 he was elected secretary of the Turin federation of the Italian Socialist Party.

He was imprisoned for the first time in 1917, with other socialist leaders, for his anti-war stance. He was a delegate to the socialist congress in Rome in 1918, and he became close towards the positions of the newspaper L'Ordine Nuovo. On 1 May 1919, he was the official speaker of the united demonstration of socialists, anarchists and democrats in La Spezia. In 1921, at the Livorno congress, he was among the founders of the Communist Party of Italy. He was active in the party leadership, dealing with the organisation and founding of the daily newspaper l'Unità, of which, in 1924, he was the first director.

=== Between wars ===
Close to the positions of Angelo Tasca, he couldn't participate in the internal debate of the party because he was wanted by the fascist police. Arrested in October 1926, he was freed six months later and eventually fled to France. In his exile in France, Pastore was involved in trade union activities. In 1928, he moved from France to Brussels, where he collaborated on the edition of the anti-fascist periodical Il Riscatto. Threatened by OVRA spies, Pastore left the Belgian capital to reach Moscow, as a delegate to the sixth congress of the Communist International.

Joined by his family, he worked in the Comintern and in the Profinten, then at the International Agricultural Institute and at the International Lenin School, where he held courses on the workers' movement in Italy. Under the pseudonym of Carlo Rossi, he wrote for Pravda, making several short trips to France and Belgium to maintain contact with the communities of anti-fascists who had fled. In 1936 he went to Barcelona, on behalf of Togliatti, to convince Guido Picelli to accept the command of the 9th battalion of the International Brigades, which would later be incorporated into the famous Garibaldi Battalion of the Spanish Civil War.

In 1938, he returned to France, where he directed the periodical La voce degli italiani, the newspaper of the anti-fascist emigrants of which Emilio Sereni was editor-in-chief.

=== World War II ===
At the outbreak of war, he managed to escape from the French police and survived by working as an accountant. In 1943, he was arrested by the Nazis while trying to cross the border to join the Resistance forces and sent to Italy to serve his sentence. Imprisoned in Vercelli, he managed to escape thanks to his brother, in fact contacting the prison management and explaining that his arrest was a mistake, since Ottavio Pastore was a friend of Benito Mussolini. Released in the evening, he managed to join the partisans in Val di Susa before the prison management realised the mistake.

=== Later life ===
At the Liberation, after having been part of the CLN Alta Italia, Pastore returned to Turin, where he worked first at the Viglongo publishing house and then returned to l'Unità, where he was director of the Turin department in 1947-1948. He was then re-elected twice, in 1953 in the second legislature and in 1958 in the third, before dying in Rome on 28 June 1965.
