= Francesco Grazioli =

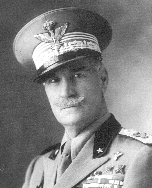

Senator of the Kingdom of Italy
- In office May 10, 1929 – August 5, 1943
- Monarch: Vittorio Emanuele III
- Prime Minister: Benito Mussolini

Personal details
- Born: December 16, 1869 Florence, Tuscany, Italy
- Died: February 20, 1951 (aged 81) Florence, Tuscany, Italy
- Education: Military Academy of Modena

Military service
- Allegiance: Kingdom of Italy; Italy
- Branch: Royal Italian Army; Italian Army
- Years of service: 1883 – 1947
- Rank: Army Corps General
- Battles/wars: Italo-Turkish War; World War I: Italian front; Battle of Caporetto

Francesco Saverio Grazioli (December 16, 1869 – February 20, 1951) was an Italian general and politician who was a Senator of the Kingdom of Italy from May 10, 1929, to August 5, 1943. He was also a veteran of World War I, commanding the VIII Corps during the Italian front and at the Battle of Caporetto.

== Biography ==
Born into a family of wealthy agrarians of Papal tradition, in 1883 he entered the military college of his hometown and three years later was admitted to the Military Academy of Modena, where he served two years before moving on to the Scuola di applicazione in Turin, where he met Giulio Douhet. From 1896 to 1898, he was stationed in Eritrea after his repatriation. In 1899 Grazioli entered the War School of Civitavecchia, where he finished his military studies.

In October 1900, he married Anna Agnese Bianco and from the marriage, Andreina was born the following year. Grazioli transferred in January 1901 to the General Staff of the 16th Territorial Division at Livorno and in the following July, he was assigned to Sulmona to the 18th Field Artillery as the commander of the battery. In July 1903, he was assigned to the special office of the Army Chief of Staff under Tancredi Saletta and then on his successor Alberto Pollio.

In March 1910, he was promoted to major for exceptional merits and appointed commander of the 3rd battalion of the 2nd grenadiers in Rome. In that period he lost his son Mario, who died of an incurable disease at the age of 7; almost simultaneously, he became the father of his second daughter, Graziella. He participated in the Italo-Turkish War from October 1911 to October 1912 and later, World War I, during which he commanded the VIII Army Corps during the Battle of Caporetto and was a commander of the Arditi. At this point, Grazioli with his two army corps and the Lambro Brigade, had the task of breaking through the Austro-German deployment on the Piave. It was considered an operation that, with his troops, succeeded by entering Vittorio Veneto first and thus putting an end to the First World War. He was then given honorary citizenship of the city and his name in the main square of the city. During World War I, his third daughter was born, whom he named Vittoria in honor of Vittoria and Vittorio Veneto.

During the Italian Regency of Carnaro of Gabriele D'Annunzio and his followers, Grazioli was at the head of the allied corps stationed in the city but the intervention of D'Annunzio did not intervene to hinder the occupation and so the French contingents, the British and the Americans withdrew to some barracks in the center. In the Interwar Period, Grazioli enrolled in the Italian Geographic Society in 1920 and in the meantime he was appointed Senior Director of military schools, which he held until March 8, 1923, and in 1921, he was accepted into the Army Council.

Grazioli was an advocate of a small but well-armed army, guided by an offensive strategic doctrine and inspired by a tactic that allowed speed and ease of maneuver. Grazioli then proposed to dissolve the body of staff and replace it with an alternative path, open and accessible to anyone who deserved it. He was considered a "progressive" for these ideas, and he was also promoted to Army Corps General on January 25, 1923, and from May 4, 1925, to February 6, 1927, he held the position of Deputy Chief of Army Staff.

Despite being a Fascist, he did not participate in the March on Rome because of his loyalty to the monarchy. In December 1928, he was appointed Senator of the Kingdom of Italy and on May 10, he took the oath of rite. In the Upper House, he was a member of the Finance Commission and from 1933 to 1937 he was the rapporteur of the expenditure forecasts of the Ministry of War. Grazioli finished his military career with the rank of Army General, received on October 21, 1937, the same year in which he became President of the Circle of Officers of the Armed Forces until 1939.

From November 1938 to March 1940, on the designation of the minister Attilio Teruzzi, he was also appointed vice president of the Italian transport company for East Africa, an organization created for the economic development of the Empire. Grazioli was placed in the reserves in January 1940 and in the spring of 1941, he managed to become, through the intercession of Alfredo Guzzoni, director of the magazine Nazione Militare. In December 1942, after Benito Mussolini quoted a report of his on the Soviet army in a speech, he proposed to the Duce the idea of a separate peace with the USSR.

In the days immediately preceding the last session of the Grand Council of Fascism, he formally promoted a request for a plenary session of the Senate, signed between July 22 and 24, 1943 by 63 fellow senators on the agenda was the will to unite the country around the person of the Sovereign in order to resist the war events. The reasoning for the request, expressed by Grazioli in a memo to the President of the Senate Giacomo Suardo, highlighted the gravity of the situation and also the awareness of the role of the residual traditional statutory institutions of the Army and Senate around the Sovereignty in addressing the crisis.

Being hostile to the new Head of Government Pietro Badoglio, on September 19, 1943, he was approached by Guido Buffarini Guidi who proposed him to become Minister of National Defense and War Production in the new government of the Italian Social Republic and in exchange, he would have obtained promotion to Marshal of Italy and the appointment as acting deputy prime minister, but Grazioli refused, suggesting the name of Rodolfo Graziani to the Pisan lawyer. After the advance of the Allies, he was expelled from the Senate on 7 August 1944 by the High Court of Justice for the sanctions against Fascism for having been one of the "presidents of legislative offices and commissions after January 3, 1925, but no other charges were brought against him.

After the conclusion of World War II, he was still very polemical towards Badoglio, with whom would be the protagonist of a lively exchange of accusations as Grazioli accused his colleague from Monferrato of being fair to Mussolini, but the two soldiers would later reconcile. Being very active in the field of historiography, he also published the opera Le operazioni militari nel 1848 e Luci ed ombre nella campagna del 1848 in Italia. With the historian Gioacchino Volpe, he was the author of a series on the classics of Italian military thought, but he wanted to narrate the works at an encomiastic and hagiographic tone, free from any criticism or judgment, as the regime wanted in those years, this promptly caused the expulsion of the only true academic military historian of that period, Piero Pieri, who, even as a character extraneous to the regime, did not want to give up his freedom of judgment.

Grazioli retired in December 1947 due to his age and he died of a cerebral hemorrhage in Florence on February 20, 1951.

== Awards ==
- Commemorative medal of the African campaigns
- Cross of Seniority (Italy)
- Medal of Military Valor (Silver Medal)
- Commemorative Medal for the Italo-Turkish War 1911-1912
- War Merit Cross
- Commemorative Medal for the Italo-Austrian War 1915–1918
- Inter-Allied Victory Medal
- Commemorative Medal of the Unity of Italy
- Order of the Crown of Italy, Knight (December 26, 1907)
- Order of Saints Maurice and Lazarus, Knight (June 5, 1913)
- Order of the Crown of Italy, Officer (May 23, 1915)
- Colonial Order of the Star of Italy, Knight (December 30, 1917)
- Order of the Crown of Italy, Commander (September 13, 1918)
- Order of Saints Maurice and Lazarus, Officer (January 12, 1919)
- Military Order of Savoy, Officer (May 17, 1919)
- Order of the Crown of Italy, Grand Officer (November 11, 1919)
- Order of Saints Maurice and Lazarus, Commander (December 30, 1919)
- Order of the Crown of Italy, Knight of the Grand Cross (May 3, 1924)
- Order of Saints Maurice and Lazarus, Grand Officer (June 1, 1930)
- Order of Saints Maurice and Lazarus, Knight of the Grand Cross (January 15, 1934)
