= Arditi =

Italian special forces in WWI

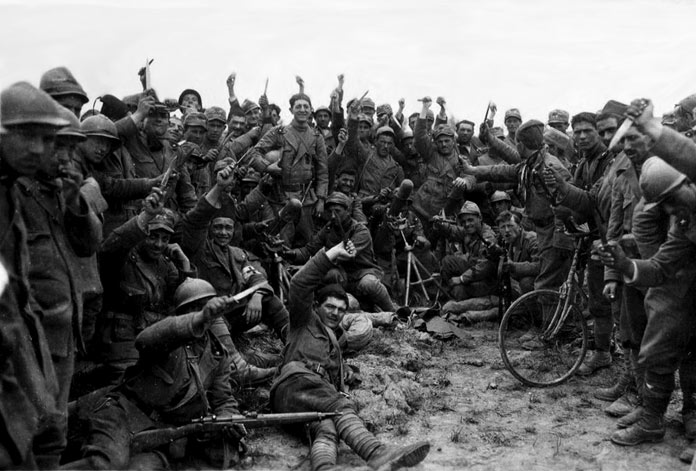
- Members of the Arditi corps, 1918, wielding daggers
- Active: 1917–1921
- Disbanded: Last unit disbanded in 1921
- Country: Kingdom of Italy
- Branch: Royal Italian Army
- Type: Elite assault infantry
- Role: Shock troops
- Size: 34,000 (total in September 1918)
- Part of: Corps and Field Army commands
- Garrison/HQ: Military training area, Sdricca di Manzano, near Friuli
- Nicknames: Fiamme nere ('Black flames')
- Mottos: "A chi sarà sempre riservata la gloria e la gioia di osare l'impossibile? "A NOI!"" ('Who will always be given the glory and the joy of daring the impossible? "TO US!"')
- Colors: Black
- March: Giovinezza (1917 version) Fiamme nere
- Anniversaries: Every last Sunday in July
- Engagements: World War I; Eleventh Battle of the Isonzo; First Battle of the Piave River; Second Battle of the Piave River; Battle of Vittorio Veneto

Commanders
- Ceremonial chief: Victor Emmanuel III
- Notable commanders: Francesco Grazioli; Giuseppe Bassi; Ottavio Zoppi; Ernesto De Marchi; Giovanni Messe

Insignia
- Gorget Patches

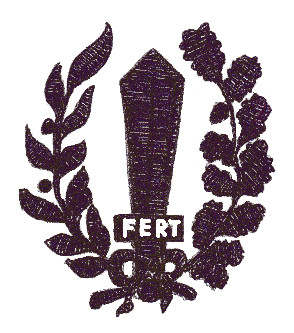
- Arm Badge

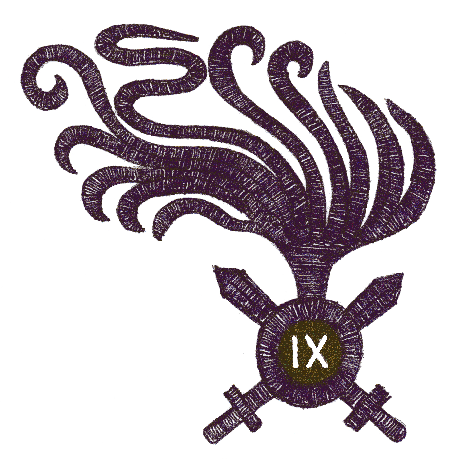
- Cap Badge

- Flag of the Arditi

Arditi (from the Italian verb ardire, 'to dare', and translates as "The Daring [Ones]") was the name adopted by a Royal Italian Army elite special force of World War I. They and the opposing German Stormtroopers were the first modern shock troops, and they have been called "the most feared corps by opposing armies".

Reparti d'Assalto ('Assault units') were formed in the summer of 1917 by Colonel Bassi, and were assigned the tactical role of shock troops, breaching enemy defenses in order to prepare the way for a broad infantry advance. The Arditi were not units within infantry divisions, but were considered as an independent branch within the Italian Infantry Arm.

The Reparti d'Assalto were successful in bringing in a degree of movement to what had previously been a war of entrenched positions. They won numerous engagements armed mainly with daggers and hand grenades, which proved very effective in the confined space of a trench. Their exploits on the battlefield were exemplary and they gained an illustrious place in Italian military history. They were demobilized by 1920.

The name Arditi was later used in 1919–20 by the Italian occupiers of Fiume who were led by Gabriele D'Annunzio, most of whom had been members of the Royal Italian Army. Their use of a uniform with black ties, insignia and fez was later taken up by Benito Mussolini's paramilitary forces, the Blackshirts. In 1942, during the Second World War, the 10th Arditi Regiment was created, inspired by the assault units of the Great War.

From 1 October 1975 the flag of X Arditi Regiment was adopted by the 9th Paratroopers Assault Regiment "Col Moschin". To this day, operatives of Col Moschin and Italian commando frogmen are known as "Arditi Incursori" and are viewed as the heirs of the Arditi.

== World War I ==
=== Early experiments ===
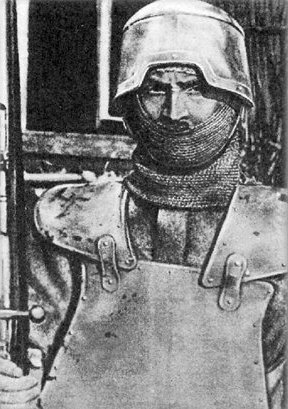
Italian soldier wearing Farina helmet and body armour, often used by the Compagnie della morte.

The first special units within the Italian Army can be traced back to 1914 when every regiment of the Royal Army was ordered to create a group of explorers trained to act behind enemy lines. One of the most famous units of this type was the Baseggio Company that attacked Monte Sant'Osvaldo in 1916.

Others argue that the so-called Compagnie della morte ('Companies of death'), special patrols of infantry and engineers engaged in cutting or blasting enemy barbed wire, should be considered as precursors of the Arditi. They were easily recognizable by their use of armor and "Farina" helmets. This was disproven by a veteran of the Arditi, and therefore should not be considered the precursors.

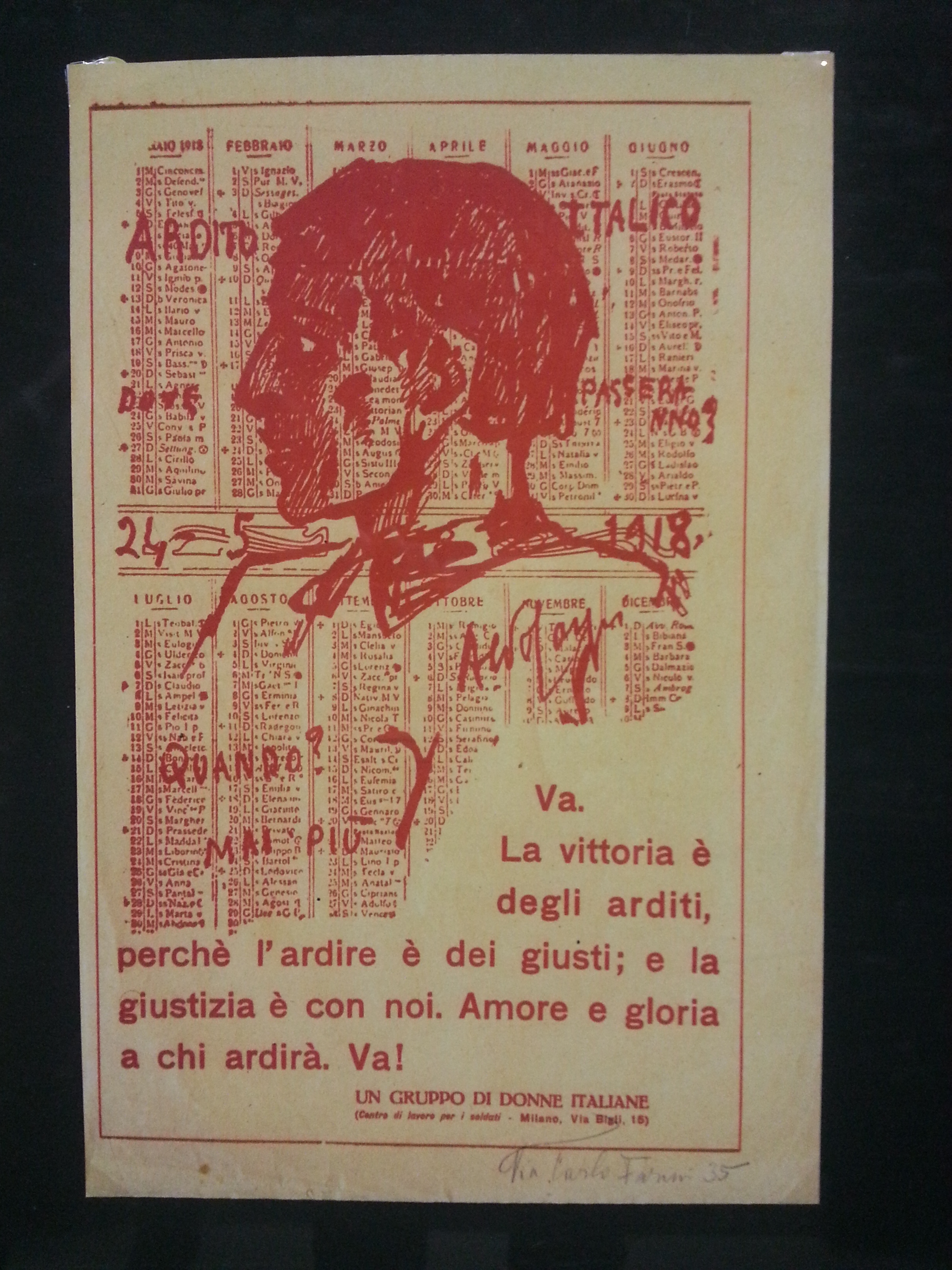
Arditi propaganda poster

In 1916 the supreme command decided to award special status to soldiers who distinguished themselves in particularly daring actions with a special sleeve badge but was reluctant to create new separate units. The "Militare ardito" badge, to be carried on the left arm, included the monogram VE (for Victor Emmanuel III of Italy), and was designed exclusively as a symbol of distinction for these soldiers. This was the first official use of the word "Ardito" by the Italian army.

In reality, all these units had no connection with the real Arditi that used extremely different tactics, training and equipment. In fact, on one hand, the scout units had the same tactics and equipment as the regular infantry, while on the other hand, the Compagnie della Morte filled a very different role, they were sappers and not shock troops and were quickly disbanded at the beginning of 1916.

The idea that would later lead to the birth of the Italian Assault Units dates back to the summer of 1916. In fact, in that period Major General Francesco Grazioli, commander of the "Lambro" Infantry Brigade, wrote papers in which he explained his ideas on the creation of special elite infantry units that would allow the stalemate of trench warfare to be overcome. Grazioli, who had observed the bloody attacks of the Italian infantry on the Carso in 1915, thought that these units should employ aggressive shock tactics, focusing in particular on identifying, mass attacking and breaking through the weakest points of the enemy lines, and then advancing in depth, encircling and destroying the strongest points of resistance so as to cause the collapse of an entire section of front.

According to Grazioli these units, called Plotoni Speciali (Special Platoons), were to be made up of 36 men each and commanded by a junior officer. 27 soldiers, divided into three patrols of 9 men each, had to be trained in hand-to-hand combat, trench clearing and throwing of hand grenades, their equipment had to consist of a Carcano carbine, 5 SIPE hand grenades and a dagger. The rest of the men would form the Machine-Pistol section of the platoon equipped with two Villar Perosa Machine-Pistols each.

These platoons, created by Grazioli only in his brigade, were formed and trained in the months of June and July 1916 and would go into combat for the first time in August of the same year in the Sixth Battle of the Isonzo. In fact, although it is not certain, it is probable that the special platoons played the role of spearhead in the attack of the "Lambro" Brigade against Monte Calvario on 6 and 7 August 1916.

In the following months the platoons continued to be part of the Brigade, mainly taking part in small-scale actions such as the counterattack east of Gorizia on 11 February 1917 in which the platoons drove the Austro-Hungarians from a position called Casa Due Pini which was lost following an enemy raid.

In the month of May the Tenth Battle of the Isonzo began and the special platoons, reorganized and enlarged, were employed on the hills east of Gorizia but without much success.

After the battle Grazioli was promoted and placed in command of the 48th Infantry Division and this allowed him to develop the idea of shock troops in greater depth and on a larger scale. In fact, as early as March 7, 1917, the brigade commander sent instructions to his regimental commanders instructing the two regiments to reorganize and expand the special platoons already created in 1916. Thus, the formation of special platoons evolved into entire special companies, occasionally assembled into a special or assault battalion, to be reinforced with the fourth heavy machine gun sections of both regiments and all available machine pistol sections. In March, the brigade was transferred to the rear for rest, where the new system of special detachments was refined and where some live-fire exercises were held in April.

Meanwhile, the Austro-Hungarian Army had also established its own assault units, which began appearing on the Italian Front from late winter 1917 onwards. After the Italian intelligence services gathered information and news in the early months of the year, the Supreme Command published circular No. 6230 on March 14, 1917, officially informing front-line commands of the existence of the Sturmtruppen. In addition to summary information on the methods, armament, and characteristics of the Sturmtruppen, the circular also included a training program for assault troops translated into Italian from the German. The Supreme Command invited army, corps, and division commands to establish training courses for assault troops inspired by that program, to be attended by soldiers already qualified as "Militare Ardito." Thus, during the spring, divisions and corps began assault training for their troops and proceeded to create small assault detachments within battalions and regiments, generally small and never larger than a platoon. At that time, due to the vagueness of the Supreme Command's instructions and the fact that each command was virtually free to act as it saw fit, these early assault troops were still rather embryonic, unstandardized, and varied widely from formation to formation. The circular of March 14 helped transform the "Militari Arditi" from soldiers simply awarded for very daring actions to elite troops, receiving specific training, specialized in assault methods, and to be employed in specific operations against fortified positions. However, these soldiers were not yet the future Arditi of the Assault Units, as they were still part of the infantry, embedded in ordinary battalions and regiments, and viewed essentially as specialized soldiers for a specific role, like machine-gunners, and always within the context of their unit.

=== Establishment ===
As commander of the 48th Infantry Division, Grazioli came into contact with a Major who had also theorized the establishment of shock units using special equipment and tactics. His name was Giuseppe Bassi and he was part of the 150th Infantry Regiment of the "Trapani" Brigade.

Bassi, between October and November 1916, had written documents in which he theorized a reorganization and a very innovative use of the Machine-Pistol sections equipped with the Villar Perosa. He believed that the use of the Villar Perosa as light machine guns was a waste and suggested a series of modifications to improve the weapon: the removal of the heavy shield which limited mobility, the introduction of a very light bipod, the modification of the magazines to make the weapon easier and quicker to reload. This later evolved into introduction of carriages and supports that allowed the gunner to hold the weapon standing up without a crew and to fire it from the hips.

Thus modified, the Villar Perosa should have been used, according to Bassi, to lead attacks by using it as an assault weapon to clear the trenches and storm enemy positions, a role that suited it very well due to its rate of fire. But Bassi went further by imagining that the Villar Perosa should have been the base of new units of élite soldiers trained in the use of shock tactics and armed with equipment suitable for trench assaults. In his writings, in fact, Bassi explained that, by preceding the regular infantry in the offensives, small units armed with short rifles and hand grenades, accompanied by the violent fire of the Villar Perosa, could break the stalemate of trench warfare.

Bassi delivered these papers to his superior, General Gaetano Giardino, who in turn sent them to Francesco Saverio Grazioli knowing his interest in these ideas. The two met and combined their ideas and had among the readers of their documents the commander of the 2nd Italian Army, General Luigi Capello. Capello, an officer with a very offensive mindset and also looking for new methods to overcome trench warfare, showed himself very interested in the theories of Grazioli and Bassi.

The two had the opportunity to put into practice what they had theorized in the summer of 1917, in fact on 26 June General Cadorna published a document in which he ordered the Army commanders to set up special shock units to use them in counterattacks, trench raids and as the spearhead in large-scale offensives, specifying to favor the Bersaglieri, troops with generally better physical preparation and training than regular infantrymen, but at the same time remaining rather vague and generic, allowing individual officers to make various changes.

Capello immediately ordered the commander of the XXIV Army Corps, General Caviglia, to proceed with the creation of a unit of this type of the size, for the moment, of a company. Caviglia created the assault company within General Fara's 47th Infantry Division, forming it with troops from the Division's Bersaglieri Regiments and based on the ideas of Grazioli and Bassi. The company was created on 5 July and had 229 enlisted men and 37 COs and NCOs and had four platoons divided into four squads and was equipped with: four Machine-Pistol sections with two Villar Perosa each, one section per platoon, a Machine Gun section with two Fiat-Revelli Mod 1914 machine guns, a mortar section and a flamethrower section. The individual equipment of the Arditi consisted of a Carcano carbine, lighter and less cumbersome than the long rifle, a dagger and about a dozen hand grenades. Furthermore, to improve agility and mobility, the cyclist's tunic with open collar was adopted, which would soon become the official uniform of the assault units.Satisfied with the Bersaglieri Assault Company, Capello asked Cadorna for permission to create an assault unit with regular infantry soldiers and the Generalissimo granted it. So Capello ordered Grazioli to create two assault companies with recruits from the infantry units of his 48th Division. Grazioli, first of all, chose with Bassi a location near Udine called Sdricca di Manzano to create the training school and the headquarters of the Arditi, there the recruits were then gathered and were joined by the Bersaglieri Company.

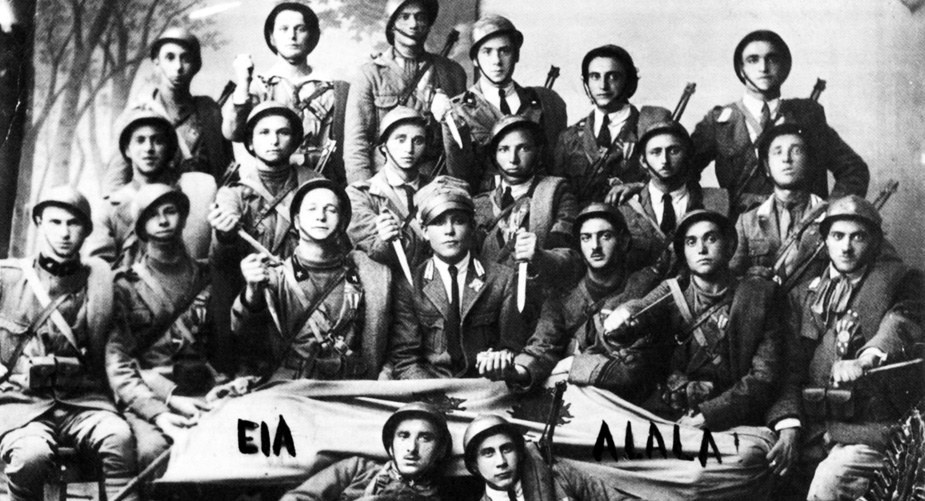
Brigata Bologna's Arditi at the command of Lieutenant Arturo Avolio

On July 29, 1917, in the presence of Cadorna and King Vittorio Emanuele III, the two new companies were created and together with the Bersaglieri Company they formed the first assault unit of the Italian Army which was called I Battaglione d'Assalto (1st Assault Battalion) officially marking the birth of the Arditi.

At the beginning of August the three companies continued training in the realistic and harsh Sdricca camp built by Bassi and in that period Capello wanted to introduce an element that became one of the major symbols of the Arditi: the flame-shaped collar tabs. The Arditi from the infantry wore the black flames while the Arditi Bersaglieri kept the crimson flames, already used by the units of the Bersaglieri corps, and, in the following months, the green flames were introduced for the Arditi coming from Alpine units. Furthermore Capello decided to create a third company of infantrymen constituted once again by the 48th Division, so the battalion had 4 companies that were renamed 1st, 2nd and 3rd Assault Companies while the Bersaglieri Company became 4th.

Training ended on 12 August, just when the Eleventh Battle of the Isonzo was imminent.

=== The Eleventh Battle of the Isonzo and its aftermath ===
The Arditi had their baptism of fire in the Eleventh Battle of the Isonzo. General Capello wanted his Arditi to operate on most of the front and therefore decided to divide the Assault Battalion and send the Companies to different locations. The 1st and 2nd Assault Companies were placed under the command of the XXVII Army Corps, the 3rd under that of Grazioli's 48th Division and the 4th under that of General Fara's 47th Division within the XXIV Army Corps.

On the afternoon of August 17, 1917, the Italian artillery unleashed a very violent bombardment on the Austro-Hungarian front from Tolmino to the sea and reached maximum intensity on the afternoon of August 18. Then, between 18 and 19 August, the infantry of the 2nd Army began to cross the Isonzo and invest the enemy defenses east of the river.

The 1st Company of Captain Maggiorino Radicati moved, on 18 August, from its barracks in Kambresko to Ronzina where it received orders: the Assault Company had the task of disembarking east of the Isonzo by boats and then attacking and conquering the town of Loga in order to create a first bridgehead and allow the passage of the "Trapani" Brigade. During the night the Arditi received the order to advance and, while the machine guns and mortars of the company targeted the east bank, the first Arditi began the crossing. In the early hours of 19 August the entire Company was on the other side and at dawn the attack on Loga began. Having easily conquered the front line trenches parallel to the river, Radicati's Company pushed deep into the town and, leaving a platoon to mop up the buildings, clashed against a railway toll booth defended by numerically superior enemies who pushed back the Arditi. Despite this, Loga was secured and the "Trapani" Brigade had crossed the Isonzo so the Assault Company had done its duty. Remaining on the front line until the morning of August 20, the unit returned to Ronzina and from there by truck to Kambresko.

The 2nd Company operated just north of the 1st and was ordered to cross the Isonzo north of the town of Auzza, cross the Osvje valley and conquer Na Raunich, known as Height 511. When the Arditi, on the night of August 18, found themselves in front of the river they realized that the crossing was impossible due to enemy artillery and, under the command of Captain Italo Porcari, marched north to use the bridge built by the Alpini Battalion "Belluno" near the Doblar railway.

In the early hours of August 19, the 2nd Company ran across the bridge under fire and found itself on the other side with its entire force. The Arditi quickly attacked the front lines in the Osvje valley and captured several prisoners, a mortar, a 37mm gun and a 77mm gun. Without stopping, they broke into the rear where they surprised the enemy reinforcements that were preparing a counterattack, pushing them into the valley and forcing the survivors to surrender. The loot of the Arditi was added to three machine guns, a Machine-Pistol captured by the Austro-Hungarians and a second mortar. Resuming the advance, the Arditi together with the Alpini attacked and occupied height 511 and remained in line until 18:00. The following day they returned to Kambresko where they rejoined the 1st Company.

South of Loga, the 4th Company operated and was attached to the 21st Bersaglieri Regiment of the V Bersaglieri Brigade which, with the I Bersaglieri Brigade, formed the 47th Division. The Division was tasked with breaking through the first enemy defensive line on the Bainsizza, consisting of three fortified hills: Fratta, Semmer and height 856. The Company commanded by Captain Salvadori began the crossing at 11pm on August 18 and by midnight was completely on the other bank south of Loga. At dawn the Arditi attacked the first positions at the foot of the Fratta and subsequently took possession of height 300 from which they could attack the top of the hill. However, since they were isolated from the rest of the V Bersaglieri Brigade and risked being surrounded, they retreated. The Brigade reorganized and the 4th Company was attached to the XXXVII Bersaglieri Battalion. The next day the Battalion attacked the Fratta with the Assault Company in the lead and managed to occupy the top of the hill. Arditi and Bersaglieri repelled various counterattacks until the 4th Company was also withdrawn to the western bank. In the meantime, the Semmer and height 856 were also occupied by the I Bersaglieri Brigade and the first Austro-Hungarian line was broken.

More difficult was the debut of the 3rd Assault Company which was sent much further south near Gorizia under the command of the 48th Division. The Company, attached to the "Lambro" Brigade, had the task of occupying the positions of San Marco and Belpoggio but, although the Arditi managed to take Belpoggio, San Marco remained in enemy hands and the other Italian units were also pushed back. Since the attack had been suspended there was no longer any reason to keep the Arditi at the front and so the 3rd Company was also brought back to the rear.

After the clashes on Bainsizza and on the hills east of Gorizia, the four companies gathered at Sdricca to prepare the action that Capello had in mind. In fact, after the breakthrough of the Austro-Hungarian lines on Bainsizza, the Italian army crashed against Mount San Gabriele. This mountain occupied a strategic position in the center of the Isonzo valley, east of Salcano, and its conquest would have opened the way to the Tarnova plateau and the Vipacco valley as well as to the bypass of the line of hills that rose east of Gorizia. The Austrians, aware of this, heavily fortified the already impervious and wooded mountain. The first attack was launched on August 31 by troops of the "Arno" Brigade who briefly occupied the peak before being repelled by a counterattack. Capello immediately decided to use the 2nd, 3rd and 4th companies under the command of Maggiorino Radicati, who in the meantime had been placed in charge of the entire I Battalion.

The Arditi arrived in the 11th Division sector on 1 September and the attack was scheduled for 4 September. The 2nd Company had orders to attack the first lines on the slopes of San Gabriele and then occupy the summit and the eastern slope, the 4th was tasked with attacking the Santa Caterina spur on the right flank and the 3rd was ordered to attack the Dol saddle on the left flank.

At 5am on 4 September the Italian artillery opened a very destructive fire on San Gabriele and the area around, 15 minutes later the Arditi began to cross no man's land. At 5:30am the bombardment ceased and the attack began. The 2nd Company broke through the lines on the slopes and attacked the summit, with the Austro-Hungarians also unaware of the assault, clearing it with hand grenades and flamethrowers at 6:30 am and then descending onto the eastern slopes. The 4th Company took Santa Caterina and the positions behind it, linking up with the 2nd on the eastern slopes. The 3rd Company, however, took the blockhouse on the Dol saddle but failed to occupy the rear heights 526 and 367. From Sabotino, Cadorna, Capello and King Vittorio Emanuele watched Lieutenant Salvatore Farina plant the tricolour on San Gabriele using a captured rifle as a spear. 3127 prisoners, 55 machine guns and 26 trench guns had been captured and Initially the Arditi seemed unstoppable, so much so that they began to advance towards Mount San Daniele east of San Gabriele, but the intervention of enemy artillery stopped them. Waves of Austro-Hungarians repeatedly attacked the Arditi who pushed them back at the cost of heavy losses. The "Arno" Brigade sent infantry battalions as reinforcements but did not make it in time and the Arditi decided to abandon the eastern slopes of the mountain to retreat to the summit due to the lack of reinforcements and supplies. The Arditi defended the summit until 19:00 but, short of supplies and reinforcements and with many officers killed, they spontaneously retreated. In the following days the mountain changed occupant several times following attacks and counterattacks from both sides until on 10 September the Italians gave up and left San Gabriele in enemy hands.

While the fighting was still going on on the Bainsizza, the first assault unit of the 3rd Army also had its baptism of fire. The unit had been created in July within the 11th Regiment of the II Bersaglieri Brigade and was made up of three companies with about 200 men each (of which the third was not yet ready) equipped, in addition to carbines and hand grenades, with 20 Machine-Pistols and 4 flamethrower sections, while HMGs were still missing and officers were scarce.

At the beginning of the battle, the Arditi were attached to the "Murge" Infantry Brigade, which formed the 28th Division with the II Bersaglieri Brigade, and were held in reserve. On August 20, the Bersaglieri Brigade was withdrawn and the "Murge" Brigade and the Arditi went into action.

The task was to advance in succession on Heights 145, 175, 199, 279 and 280 along the Flondar-Medeazza line. After the artillery barrage, the Arditi, followed by the battalions of the "Murge" Brigade, went over the top at 8 am against Height 145 which was taken at 09:45 am. The Italians continued towards Height 175 but, due to the lack of officers and cohesion, the assault unit disintegrated and the companies fought separately and isolated. The Austro-Hungarian artillery and machine guns blocked the attack and at 11:15 am the Italians lost Height 145 which was then retaken and lost twice and then captured and held in a third assault at the end of the day. On 21 August the "Murge" Brigade and the Arditi attacked and took Height 175 which was however lost due to a counterattack that was pushed up to Height 145. The Italians then retook both heights at 12:50 am but at 4 pm they lost Height 175 again. The "Murge" Brigade was ordered to retake the height at all costs and a final attack, started at 6 pm, allowed them to retake it and hold it until the morning of 22 August, repelling all counterattacks. On that morning the two Assault Companies were withdrawn due to heavy losses and the officers of the 3rd Army, due to lack of organization and cohesion, disbanded the entire assault unit of the 11th Bersaglieri Regiment.

Despite the failure to conquer San Gabriele, the Assault Battalion of the 2nd Army made a positive impression on the Supreme Command, which on September 21, 1917 published a document that described more precisely and less vaguely the uniform, organization and armament to be adopted for the assault units, virtually imposing the model of the 2nd Army on all the others. The only point of disagreement between Capello and the Command was the imposition of only three companies for Assault Battalion, while Capello supported the need for a fourth.

Thus in September the Italian Armies dedicated themselves to the creation of the Assault Battalions. The 1st Army raised the battalions IV, IX, XXIII and XXIV, the 6th Army raised the XVI Assault Battalion, the 4th Army raised the battalions VI, V, VIII and VII, the III Army Corps raised the XVII Assault Battalion, the Carnia Zone Command raised the XVIII Battalion, the 3rd Army, learning from the failure of its first assault unit, raised the battalions XIX, XX, XXI and XXII and, finally, the 2nd Army raised another five battalions called II, III, IV, V and VI.

In the months of September and October the Assault Battalions concentrated on training and only the II Assault Battalion of the 2nd Army and the V Assault Battalion of the 4th Army had their baptism of fire. On September 29, the 1st Company of the newly created II Assault Battalion, attached to the "Venezia" Infantry Brigade, took part in the attack on Height 800, a dominant position on the Vallone di Chiapovano, in turn a vital communication route between the Isonzo valley and the Tarnova plateau. At 6:30 am the artillery of the 44th Division opened a very violent fire on the height that was shelled until 8 am. The Arditi, followed by the infantry, came out of the trenches a few minutes before the end of the barrage and at 8:20 am Height 800 was taken. The Arditi, having descended on the eastern slope, attacked and occupied the enemy rear where they crushed an attempted counterattack by the enemy, annihilating their reserves. At the end of the battle, the Italians had captured 15 Machine Guns and 1,039 enemies, including 47 officers. Once the attack was concluded, the company returned to the II Assault Battalion at Sdricca. Later elements of the 2nd Company of the same battalion spearheaded the assault and conquest of Height 814 on 8 October. Meanwhile the V Assault Battalion of the 4th Army had its debut in the battle on Monte Piana between 22 and 23 October. In that battle mixed units of both Austrian and German Sturmtruppen overwhelmed the Italian positions on the mountain, thus the V, in that moment still only company-sized, was rushed to the frontline where it carried out a victorious counterattack, recapturing all the lost ground

=== The Retreat of Caporetto ===
The German breakthrough at Caporetto on 24 October 1917 caught the Arditi gathered in their training camps and, due to the emergency, they were employed together with the Bersaglieri, Cyclists and Cavalry as rearguard troops to protect the retreat.

The first assault unit to face the enemy advance was the IV Assault Battalion of the 1st Army which fought first at Luico, then at Savogna and Castel del Monte against the 12th Silesian Division between 24 and 25 October and, after suffering heavy losses, was attached to the IV Bersaglieri Brigade with which it retreated first to the Tagliamento and on 9 November to the Piave. From there it was sent to the Asiago Plateau to reorganize.

The Assault Battalions V and VI of the 4th Army covered the retreat from Cadore to Monte Grappa and sustained heavy fighting at Sappada and Quero. The nearby Carnia Zone Command also used its XVIII Battalion as a rearguard at Navarons and Forcella Clautana until it reached the new line and was disbanded.

Within the 3rd Army, only the XIX Battalion retreated without taking part in the rearguard actions sustained by the XX, XXI and XXII Battalions on the Livenza. Once the passage west of the Piave was completed, the XIX, XX and XXI Battalions were left at the front until December while the XXII was taken to the rear due to heavy losses.

The six Assault Battalions of the 2nd Army were grouped under the command of Colonel Bassi and after the breakthrough they retreated on trucks first towards Cividale and then Udine, Cadorna HQ. There the I Battalion and units of the II sustained some fighting on the Torre torrent against the Germans who were coming from Beivars. On October 28 the I Battalion, while the other five were retreating, suffered, together with some units of Alpini and Bersaglieri, the attack of a numerically superior German force. To gain time and allow Italian soldiers and civilians to evacuate Udine, the Arditi launched bloody counterattacks and slowed down the enemy, then, due to the losses suffered, the Battalion retreated to Udine now deserted where they realized that the city was totally surrounded by Germans. The Arditi retreated to the Castle of Udine where they had their last stand in which they impressed the enemy by refusing to surrender several times and fighting until the last ammo. In the end the I Battalion was annihilated, about 360 Arditi died and only 70 were taken prisoner, including the commander of the Battalion Maggiorino Radicati. Only the 1st Company of the I Battalion escaped encirclement and managed to rejoin Bassi's Battalions, which were now among the few units of the 2nd Army that had not disintegrated. The Arditi subsequently engaged in the defense of Pinzano, a vital crossing point on the Tagliamento, but the crossing of the river at Ragogna by the Germans forced the Italians to retreat again from the Tagliamento to the Piave. Having reunited the Assault Battalions at Pieve di Soligo, Bassi managed to supply them with weapons and ammunition and let them rest for a few hours, but the Arditi quickly returned to battle. In fact, the Supreme Command ordered Bassi's Battalions to resist as long as possible on the hills between Conegliano and Vittorio Veneto to allow the 3rd Army and the remnants of the 2nd to complete the crossing of the Piave. The Arditi slowed down the enemies and gradually retreated towards Vidor, the last Italian bridgehead east of the Piave and the only town to still have an intact bridge over the river.

Vidor was defended from 6 to 10 November by the II Bersaglieri Brigade, Bassi's Arditi and two companies of Alpini who repelled all the assaults of the 12th Silesian Division. On 10 November these units were also allowed to cross the Vidor bridge which was about to be blown up and the IV Assault Battalion of the 2nd Army was the last Italian unit to leave the eastern bank of the Piave.

=== The First Battle of the Piave and the reorganization ===
The retreat from Caporetto was particularly hard for the Arditi who, employed as a rearguard, suffered heavy losses and therefore most of the units were kept in the rear while only a few took part in the battle of arrest in November-December 1917.

On the Asiago Plateau, where the 11th Austro-Hungarian Army was pressing, three of the four Assault Battalions of the 1st Italian Army threw themselves into the fray. On 10 November, to avoid a greater penetration, the XVI counterattacked the enemy at Gallio, liberating the town after heavy urban combat. The IX Battalion counterattacked at Monte Fior on 18 November and the XXIV took part in the clashes at Monte Melago, defeating the Austro-Hungarians. The three Battalions were then taken to the plains in the rear after Christmas. On the Grappa, the XVIII Battalion of the Carnia Zone, the V of the 4th Army and the III of the 2nd Army took part in the fighting and on 19 November counterattacked the Germans on Monfenera where a dangerous salient was eliminated. On the Piave, in the 3rd Army sector, the XXI and XXII Assault Battalions participated, together with various infantry units, in the counterattack that crushed a dangerous bridgehead created around the town of Zenson by several Austro-Hungarian units that had crossed the river.

While the First Battle of the Piave ended with the Italian defensive victory, the new Chief of Staff, Armando Diaz, began the reorganization of the Army.

The Arditi were initially subject to the dissolution of some units, mainly due to the losses suffered. The IX Assault Battalion of the 1st Army was disbanded, in addition to losses, also for serious acts of indiscipline committed in November and its still able men were integrated into the XVI Assault Battalion while the others were expelled from the Arditi Corp. The XVIII Battalion of the Carnia Zone and the V of the 4th Army were also disbanded for losses and their men integrated into the VI Assault Battalion. The Assault Battalions of the 3rd Army all remained operational. Bassi's Battalions of the former 2nd Army were reunited in Cartigliano, near Vicenza, and, starting from Caporetto with 5000 men, had arrived on the Piave with about 2000 divided into six thinned-out units. The Supreme Command decided to disband Battalions III, IV, V and VI and integrate their men into I and II, which were attached to the XX and XXII Corps of the 1st Army respectively, so as to have two Assault Battalions with three complete Companies.

Subsequently there were no major changes in armament, training and organization because Diaz considered the Arditi an already complete and perfected armed branch and preferred to improve and strengthen the regular infantry but he was still determined to reduce, at least in part, the autonomy of the Arditi by ordering to attach only one Assault Battalion to each Army Corps and expressly forbidding that a single officer command multiple Assault Battalions. Because of these orders, Colonel Giuseppe Bassi left the command of the Assault Battalions, greeted with emotion by his Arditi, and was placed in charge of the 76th Infantry Regiment of the "Napoli" Brigade. This dissatisfied some of the early Arditi, first and foremost Salvatore Farina and Paolo Giudici, two lieutenants who, in their post-war books, wrote how, in their opinion, the 1918 reorganization had partly distorted the Arditi.

However, in the first weeks of 1918, most of the assault units were back in excellent condition and the Army Corps that were still without an Assault Battalion provided for the creation of new Arditi units, also reviving disbanded units such as the III Battalion, recreated within the V Corps of the 1st Army, and the V Battalion, within the XXVII Corps of the 8th Army. At the same time, the Supreme Command resumed operations on a local scale along the entire front, resuming an aggressive attitude and also involving the Arditi greatly

=== The Battle of the Three Mountains ===
By early 1918, the Italian Army had fully recovered from the disaster of Caporetto and the new year began with a victory that marked the newfound offensive capacity of the Italians.

In fact, in January the so-called "Battle of the Three Mountains" was fought on the Asiago plateau. In December 1917, the Austro-Hungarians conquered the three peaks, adjacent to each other, of Col del Rosso, Col d'Echele and Monte Valbella. The Three Mountains line guaranteed the Austro-Hungarians an excellent control point over the Val Frenzela and constituted a possible starting point for a direct attack on the valley, furthermore the Italians found themselves on the edge of the plateau, almost pushed out. To give greater solidity to the defenses and to take away a tactically and strategically important position from the enemies, the Italian command organized an attack on the Three Mountains line. To conduct it, the most combative units of the Army were called upon, such as the Infantry Brigades "Sassari", "Bisagno", the 4th Bersaglieri Brigade and the Assault Battalions I, II and IV. The attack relied on a destructive but short bombardment and on a rapid and sudden advance of the assault troops against the flanks of the hills and avoiding the center, while the regular infantry was supposed to advance later to mop up the last pockets of enemy resistance and entrench the positions just occupied.

After hours of bombardment, the attack began at 9 am on January 28. The Arditi of the I Assault Battalion, followed by the infantry of the Sassari, attacked Col del Rosso and Col d'Echele which fell only in the afternoon and for the rest of the day repelled all Austro-Hungarian counterattacks. Monte Valbella was attacked by the II Assault Battalion followed by the Bersaglieri of the IV Brigade but the position resisted and the attack was stopped. On 29 January the Austrians attempted, but failed, to retake the two lost hills while the Italians renewed the attack against Monte Valbella this time with reinforcements from the IV Assault Battalion. Valbella also fell and the Austrians counterattacked along the entire line. The fighting lasted until 30 January but the Italians remained on the three hills and the Austrians retreated. This victory, in addition to ensuring a militarily important success, greatly improved the military morale of the Italians as this was the first offensive victory after Caporetto.

=== Spring 1918 ===
In early spring, the Italian command expected a major Austro-Hungarian offensive along the entire front and General Diaz ordered the Arditi to intensify raids and incursions behind enemy lines to capture prisoners, damage enemy positions and above all obtain information on the next offensive.

In March the VIII Assault Battalion (previously XXII) distinguished itself in local actions in the Piave region between Nervesa and Cavazzuccherina and similar operations were carried out in April and May by the other Assault Battalions of the 3rd Army, the XI (previously XX), XXIII (previously XIX) and XXVIII (previously XVIII). The XXIII in particular was employed on 26 May in a limited objective-offensive in the Capo Sile area where it broke into enemy defenses for a depth of 750 meters.

In April and May, on Monte Grappa under the 4th Army, the VI Assault Battalion (previously VIII) carried out several raids against Ca Tasson, the I Assault Battalion (previously X) carried out similar raids in the Monfenera sector and the IX Assault Battalion (previously VI) operated in the region of Monte Asolone.

Between April, May and July, on the Asiago plateau, the XIII Assault Battalion (previously XXI) scored successful raids in the areas of Melaghetto and Monte Valbella.

In the same months, on the Trentino front, the V Assault Battalion (previously III) carried out raids in the Vallarsa region and later on 13 May conquered, in one of the most daring and famous actions of the war, Mount Corno di Vallarsa (where Cesare Battisti had been captured two years earlier) which granted a gold medal to Lieutenant Carlo Sabatini. The other Assault Battalions of the 1st Army, X (previously XXIV) and XXIX (previously XXIII), carried out small raids respectively in the Posina Valley and in the Lagarina Valley. The XXIX also distinguished itself in a demanding local offensive in the sector of the Zugna.

On May 25, on Adamello, in the sector of the III Army Corps of the 7th Army, the III Assault Battalion (previously called XVII), together with various Alpini Battalions, played a leading role in the conquest of Cima Presena.

Later, between May and June the Arditi corpwas reorganized. First of all, to simplify logistics and communications, each Assault Battalion was ordered to assume the numeral of its Army Corps and so, on May 20:

– The I Assault Battalion (6th Army) became XX

– The II Assault Battalion (6th Army) became XXII

– The III Assault Battalion (1st Army) became V

– The IV Assault Battalion (9th Army) became XXVI

– The V Assault Battalion (8th Army) became XXVII

– The VI Assault Battalion (4th Army) became IX

– The VII Assault Battalion (9th Army) became XXX

– The VIII Assault Battalion (4th Army) became VI

– The IX Assault Battalion (4th Army) became XVIII

– The X Assault Battalion (4th Army) became I

– The XI Assault Battalion (9th Army) became XII

– The XII Assault Battalion (7th Army) became XIV

– The XIII Assault Battalion (II Corps in France) became II

– The XIV Assault Battalion (52nd Division of the 6th Army) became LII

– The XVI Assault Battalion (9th Army) became XXV

– The XVII Assault Battalion (7th Army) became III

– The XVIII Assault Battalion (3rd Army) became XXVIII

– The XIX Assault Battalion (3rd Army) became XXIII

– The XX Assault Battalion (3rd Army) became XI

– The XXI Assault Battalion (6th Army) became XIII

– The XXII Assault Battalion (8th Army) became VIII

– The XXIII Assault Battalion (1st Army) became XXIX

– The XXIV Assault Battalion (1st Army) became X

– The XXV Assault Battalion (XVI Army Corps in Albania) became XVI

– The XXVI Assault Battalion (35th Division in Macedonia) became XXXV

Subsequently the order of battle of the assault battalions changed completely. In fact at the beginning of June General Grazioli (one of the founders of the Arditi) suggested creating large units of dimensions comparable to the army corps on the model of the Arditi battalions so that they could perfectly combine firepower, shock and maneuverability and be able to achieve a strategic breakthrough also counting on the collaboration of these units with the air forces and tanks that Grazioli wanted to buy from the French and integrate into the units he had in mind.

This project fascinated the commands who decided to make it happen with some modifications. On June 10 a single division was officially created, provisionally, which was called Divisione Speciale A (Special Division "A"). The Division was structured into three assault groups, each of which was under the command of a colonel and consisted of three battalions. The division's units were also equipped with mountain artillery groups that were light enough to give the division the mobility needed for maneuver, for the fire of heavier guns it would have to rely on the artillery of regular infantry units. To improve maneuverability, armored car units were also added that would replace the Renault FT tanks that the French ultimately did not sell. The new division's strengths were the greater number of automatic weapons compared to the regular infantry, superior training and, above all, cooperation with the armored and air units with which they trained.

However, the creation of Division A, which required nine battalions, left several Army Corps without assault units and to compensate the creation of new Arditi battalions was ordered.

It was under these conditions that the Arditi faced the Battle of the Solstice.

=== The Second Battle of the Piave ===
In the Second Battle of the Piave River almost all the Assault Battalions, with the exception of the III which was in reserve, had the opportunity to fight.

On the Asiago Plateau the Austro-Hungarian advance, which had been deeper and more dangerous in the sector garrisoned by British troops, was contained and pushed back in the space of a single day. Here the LII Assault Battalion had the opportunity to distinguish itself by reconquering the lost position of Costalunga.

On Grappa the situation was more serious: attacking in the sector of the Italian IX Corps, the Austro-Hungarians broke through all three Italian lines (Col Fagheron, Col Fenilon and Col Moschin). The breakthrough put the entire defense of Grappa in serious danger and, to avoid its fall and the subsequent flanking of the troops on the Piave, a counterattack was chosen. The IX Assault Battalion commanded by Major Giovanni Messe was therefore sent to the front line. Towards evening the artillery of the X Corps opened fire on the Austro-Hungarian lines. At 9pm the Arditi launched the attack and covered their movements with the various woods present there. The first position to fall was Col Fagheron followed by Col Fenilon, both conquered in a short time and which resulted in the Arditi capturing prisoners and machine guns. Immediately the infantrymen of the "Basilicata" Brigade took possession of the conquered positions and allowed the Arditi to retreat and organize the last attack towards Col Moschin. After another bombardment, the 9th Battalion attacked the hill in the early hours of 16 June. In just 20 minutes (10 of climbing and 10 of fighting), the Austrian defenses were totally overwhelmed and the Arditi took control of Col Moschin and in addition to various machine guns, 250 prisoners were also taken, carrying out the most famous action of the Arditi which still today it gives its name to the Italian special forces. In the other sectors of Grappa the Assault Battalions XVIII and VI counterattacked the Austro-Hungarians victoriously on Mount Asolone and Mount Pertica respectively. On 16 June the Austro-Hungarian offensive ended in failure on Grappa too.

However, the most powerful attack launched by the Austro-Hungarians was on the Piave. Already on the morning of 15 June the Austro-Hungarians crossed the river, broke through the Italian lines in some places and established bridgeheads on the west bank. Most of the fighting occurred on Montello, a hill in the center of the front, which was conquered by the Austro-Hungarians up to the town of Nervesa. Immediately the Assault Battalions of the Italian armies began counterattacks to block the Austro-Hungarian advance. On Montello, the XXVII Battalion, which had been operating on the Piave since April, launched a counterattack around the town of Giavera, partially recapturing part of the lost ground and remaining to contain the Austro-Hungarians until 19 June. The XXVI Assault Battalion also fought on Montello where, counterattacking in front of Nervesa, it contributed to blocking the enemy attack. In the sector of the 3rd Army, where the Austro-Hungarians created dangerous bridgeheads at San Donà and Fossalta di Piave, the Arditi of the Army of the Duke of Aosta went into action: the XI Battalion fought between Villanova and Fagarè, the XXVIII intervened at Zenson and Villa Premuda, the XXIII fought for several days at Capo Sile and the XXV (ceded to the 3rd Army by the 1st) engaged the enemy at San Pietro Novello.

In the meantime, it was planned to use Special Division A to counterattack the bridgehead at Fossalta di Piave, between Montello and San Donà so that the three bridgeheads would not connect. The Division was brought into line but the attack, planned for 17 June, did not begin due to an unexpected Austro-Hungarian attack which was promptly blocked. The following day the Division attacked at 4pm with Fossalta di Piave, Osteria di Fossalta and Capo d'Argine as objectives. Since the Arditi were not used to operating as a Division, the various Battalions were unable to coordinate adequately and the attack was disorganized: despite their usual valor and efficiency the Arditi managed to conquer only part of their objectives and since many battalions were left with their flanks exposed, they finally withdrew. Major General Ottavio Zoppi, commander of the Assault Division, did not give up and proposed to the commander of the 33rd Infantry Division to cooperate in a counterattack. On 19 June the "Sassari" Infantry Brigade launched its attack against the bridgehead with a part of the Arditi of the Division as the spearhead and this time the Italians reached and maintained all their objectives. On 20 June the Austro-Hungarians had not achieved any notable objectives and it was decided to conclude the offensive and begin retreat operations on the eastern bank of the Piave. The retreat ended on 24 June and marked the decisive Italian victory of the war.

=== Last months of war ===
Despite the substantial failure of the counterattack on 17 June, the Italian commands decided to set up a second Arditi Division and to do so it was decided to modify the organization of the already existing one. Instead of having three Groups with three battalions each it was decided to remove the third assault battalion from each group and replace it with a battalion of Bersaglieri, in order to have a source of reinforcements to support the attack. Once the organization of Division A was modified (which was renamed the 1st Assault Division), another Division was created on the same model and was called the 2nd Assault Division, placed under the command of Major General De Marchi. The two Divisions were reunited in the so-called Assault Army Corps whose commander became General Francesco Saverio Grazioli, one of the fathers of the Arditi. The new Army Corps spent the whole summer training in both shock and maneuver, concentrating in particular on breaking through heavily fortified lines and on the pursuit, encirclement and annihilation of retreating enemies and also training in cooperation with aviation and armored car units.

While the Assault Army Corps trained, the other Arditi Units engaged in small-scale operations to damage enemy positions, capture weapons and prisoners and above all to obtain information on enemy defenses east of the Piave.

The 4th Army's Assault Battalions in the Grappa region, the IX and XVIII, launched various attacks on the most important peaks between June and July. The IX in particular distinguished itself in an albeit failed offensive on the Asolone on 24 June, the XVIII repeatedly attacked the Solaroli ridge and the 2nd Company of the VI Assault Battalion, temporarily detached from the 2nd Assault Division, spearheaded the attack and conquest of Height 1503 of Ca Tasson.

The III Assault Battalion carried out raids on the sector of the 7th Army in July and August, specifically on Monte Stablel and Punta San Matteo, in the night of 2-3 August the XXIX Assault Battalion attacked and conquered Dosso Alto di Zures in Val Lagarina and XXVII Assault Battalion began various reconnaissances beyond the Piave, including a massive raid on Fontigo on 2 July.

The main operation of the summer, however, was that carried out by the 3rd Army which launched a local offensive in the Lower Piave area to regain the last strips of land remaining in enemy hands west of the river. The attack was spearheaded mainly by the XXVIII Assault Battalion, accompanied by a provisional battalion made up of companies of the XI and XXIII, and despite initial Austro-Hungarian resistance the Italians were victorious.

In September the operations continued all over the front. In the Grappa region the XVIII Assault Battalion fought during the Italian attacks of 16 September at Col del Cuc while on the same day the VI Assault Battalion (again landed by the 2nd Assault Division) led a local offensive once again at Ca Tasson to conquer Heights 1443 and 1413, achieving only a partial success since the latter remained in enemy hands. Later in the night between 20 and 21 September the I Assault Battalion of the 2nd Assault Division scored a successful raid at Casa Forzellette, in the Monfenera area.

On the front of the 6th Army, in the Asiago region, on September 14, the LXX Assault Battalion attacked and occupied enemy positions at Grottella in Val Brenta while on the front of the 1st Army, in Trentino, the XXIX carried out a raids near Sanio and on the Piave the XXVII Assault Battalion of the 8th Army attacked and conquered an island of the river, called Isola Verde, while the XXVIII Assaut Battalion of the 3rd Army raided enemy positions at Gonfo.

In October, given the imminence of the final offensive, the XXVII Assault Battalion continued its reconnaissance beyond the Piave while on the Grappa the XXV Assault Battalion of the 2nd Assault Division victoriously stormed the enemy trenches of Monte Pertica on 4 October.

Thanks to all these operations it was possible to outline the consistency of the enemy defenses beyond the Piave.

=== The Battle of Vittorio Veneto ===
On 24 October 1918 the final attack that would lead to Italy's victory and the fall of the Austro-Hungarian Empire began and the Arditi of the Assault Army Corps would play a fundamental role.

In fact, according to the plans of the Supreme Command, General Caviglia's 8th Army should have launched a single concentrated assault in the center of the Piave, with the objective of breaking through the enemy lines and conquering the city of Vittorio Veneto, which due to its position would have allowed to separate and isolate the Austro-Hungarian armies that occupied the Veneto.

The Assault Army Corps was supposed to play the role of spearhead of the 8th Army, constituting the first bridgeheads beyond the Piave. In particular, the two Assault Divisions would have been attached to the two front-line army corps of the 8th Army, the XXII and the VIII.

However, when the battle began on 24 October, the Piave was in flood and the crossing operations did not begin.

Only on Monte Grappa, where the Italians planned to launch a diversionary attack, was it possible to take action.

The Grappa Assault Battalions, the IX, XVIII, III and XXIII, were all on the front line when at 7.15 am, after 5 hours of violent bombing, the Italians began the assault.

The attacks involved the Solaroli, Monte Pertica and above all the Asolone but due to the powerful Austrian defenses the Italian advance was slow and bloody.

Two days later, on 26 October, while the offensive on Grappa cost the Italians many losses, the waters of the Piave calmed down and the Assault Army Corps wanted to begin crossing operations. During the night the Assault Groups of the 1st Division began to land on the other bank in front of them and found themselves with the three defensive lines that they had to break through to create a bridgehead: the first line, poorly defended, called the "line of the mills", the second, more fortified and made up of a series of destroyed and fortified towns (Moriago, Fontigo, Sernaglia, Falzè and others) called "line of towns" and finally a third line made up of hills that delimited the Piave plain from the east. In the hours between 26 and 27 October the Arditi of the 1st Assault Division attacked and managed to break through the first and second lines. In the following hours, however, after some enemy counterattacks, the Arditi realized that their communication lines were too fragile and therefore Ottavio Zoppi decided to move back the occupied territory by a few kilometers to better defend themselves. On 27 October the Austrians counterattacked both on the Grappa and on the Piave but the Italians resisted. In the following days the Italians continued to advance on the Grappa and the Piave. In particular, the Italian XI Army Corps together with the British troops, with the XI Assault Battalion in the lead, occupied the Grave di Papadopoli and crossed the Piave en masse, threatening the southern flank of the Austrian defenses. The 1st Assault Division took advantage of this and continued the attack against the third line, which fell after furious fighting on 28 and 29 October. On 30 October it was clear to the Austro-Hungarian commands that the Italians, once the last defenses had been overwhelmed, were uncontainable and a general retreat was therefore ordered, also deciding to send an officer to negotiate the armistice.

On 28 October, the 2nd Assault Division, which until then had remained on the western bank of the Piave, also crossed the river and immediately began to harass the retreating enemy, pursuing him up to the Piave Valley and breaking through every provisional defense created by the Austro-Hungarians to slow them down. When the armistice came into force on 4 November, the Division had arrived in Pieve di Cadore.

In the meantime the Italian advance had become general. On 30 October the 3rd Army crossed the Piave and overwhelmed the last Austrian defenses near Grisolera and Romanziol thanks to the spearhead formed by the XXVI and XXVIII Assault Battalions which were always at the head of the Army during the advance and concluded their war on the bank east of the Tagliamento.

The 4th Army finally managed to overwhelm the defenses of Grappa and route the Austro-Hungarian 6th Army, liberating Feltre and Belluno.

On the same day the 7th, 1st and 6th Armies also began to advance and poured into Trentino with their Assault Battalions on the front line, such as the XXIX for the 1st and LII and LXX for the 6th, which served to make the first breaches in the enemy lines and routing the Austro-Hungarians.

This marked the end of the last battle of the Italian Front in which the Arditi played a decisive role.

=== Assault Battalions abroad ===
Four Assault Battalions served outside Italy in other theaters of the First World War where the Italian Army operated.

The II Assault Battalion (originally called XIII) was sent to France in April 1918, attached to the II Italian Army Corps. There it distinguished itself as a counterattack unit during the Second Battle of the Marne in the Reims sector. After the battle Alberico Albricci, commander of the Italian troops in France, ordered the creation of another Assault Battalion, called XXXII, which was involved in the breakthrough of the German lines on the Chemins des Dames in October 1918.

In Albania the XVI Battalion (formerly called XXV) operated and was mainly employed in raids against pro-Austrian Albanian militias and also participated in the great Franco-Italian offensive in Albania in July 1918. It remained there even after the war where it fought against Albanian insurgents who opposed the Italian military presence.

In Macedonia the XXXV Assault Battalion was formed as part of the 35th Italian Infantry Division. There the Arditi carried out several raids against Germans and Bulgarians and also fought in the Vardar Offensive. After the war the Battalion was among the Allied occupation troops in Istanbul.

== Training ==
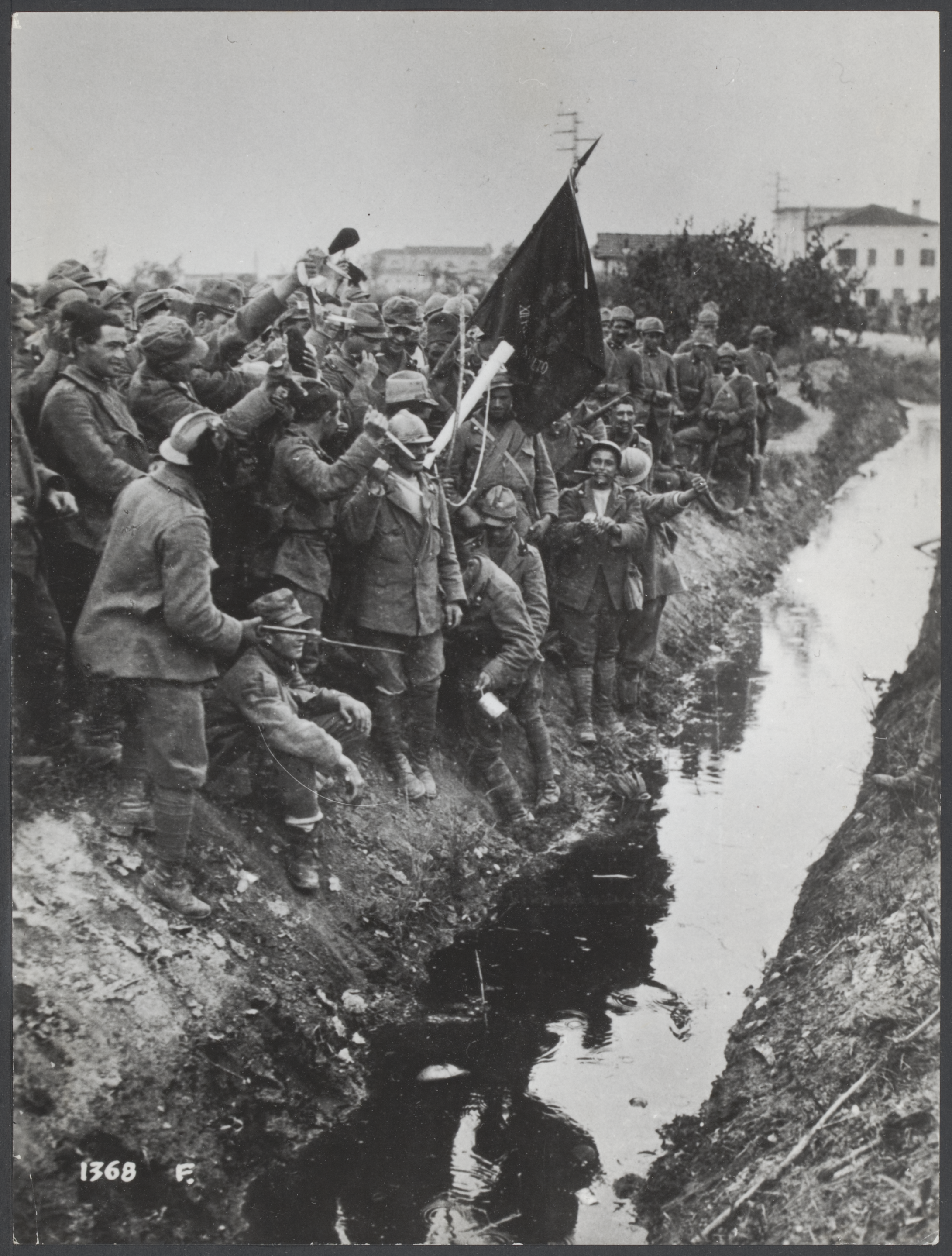
Arditi after Italian offensive at Piave, 1918

Initially the soldiers were volunteers, but later on unit commanders designated suitable soldiers for transfer to Arditi units. In the document of June 1917 the Supreme Command suggested preferring the Bersaglieri due to their greater physical prowess but in a short time the Arditi ended up being drawn en masse from the regular infantry even more than the Bersaglieri. Alpini, despite the existence of some Alpine Assault Battalions, were drawn in smaller numbers into the Arditi mainly due to their extreme esprit de corps which led them to be extremely fond of their Alpine unit. After undergoing tests of strength, skill and nerve, the recruits were trained in the use of weapons and innovative tactics of attack. They also received hand-to-hand fighting instruction with or without weapons (according to the "Flower of Battle" techniques developed in the Middle Ages), all supported by continuous physical training.

In particular, Arditi were trained with hand grenades, marksmanship and the use of the flamethrower and machine gun, including captured enemy equipment. The rigorous training, team spirit and contempt of danger, but also the privileges they enjoyed, made the Arditi an elite corps, but also created a climate of distrust and jealousy with officers belonging to other units of the regular army. Their military skill, however, earned them respect for the ability to resolve on the battlefield situations tactically extremely difficult for regular army units.

Reginaldo Giuliani, a Catholic priest and an chaplain for the Assault Battalions of the 3rd Army, wrote several books on his experiences, including Croce e spada ('Cross and Sword').

== Uniform ==
Arditi flag

The Arditi of the Reparto d’assalto were issued distinctive uniforms that identified them as an elite unit.

The Arditi uniform was based on that of the Bersaglieri Ciclisti (Italian cyclist troops). The tunic was the same as that of the Bersaglieri Ciclisti. It had shoulder straps, two belt loops and a large game pocket used for carrying hand grenades and other items. Unlike other Italian uniforms of the time, the Arditi uniform was worn with an open collar in order to facilitate movement. Arditi units made up from former infantry soldiers wore black flame collar patches with the standard Italian five pointed star. Arditi drawn from Alpini units would instead wear green flames on their lapels while Arditi drawn from Bersaglieri units would wear crimson flames. The Reparto d’assato patch was worn on the left sleeve. A gray-green sweater, also used by the Bersaglieri Ciclisti, was worn under the tunic. The sweater was replaced by a grey-green shirt and a black tie in 1918. The trousers were those of the Bersaglieri bicycle units or the Aplini units which were usually worn with woolen socks. Alpini boots were chosen over the heavier standard infantry boots. Headware varied considerably. In 1917, Arditi wore the standard infantry “scodolino” cap. This cap was replaced with a black fez with a tassle, similar to the crimson fezs worn by the Bersaglieri. Arditi drawn from the Alpini, retained their distinctive Alpini cap. The standard Italian Adrian helmet was, of course, worn in combat and was decorated with the numeral of the Assault Battalion in Roman numerals.

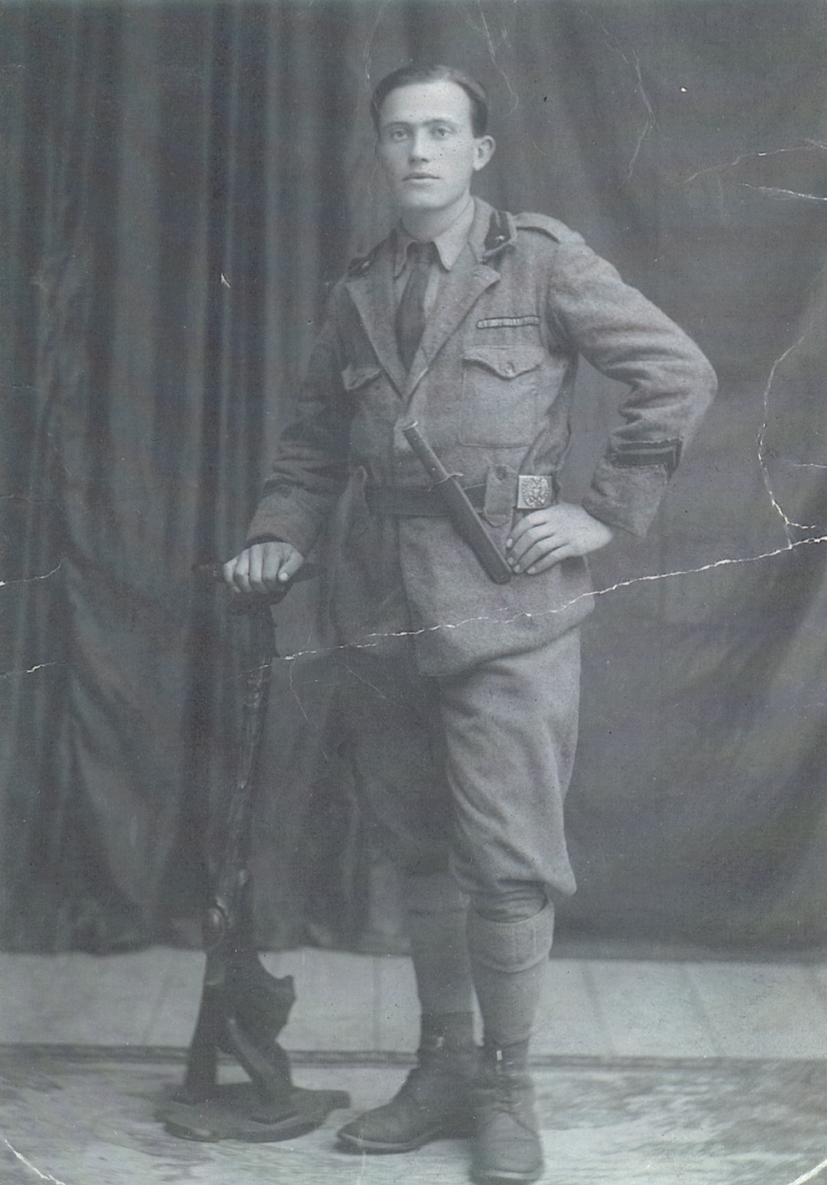
Photograph of an Ardito from the 12th Reparto d'Assalto in uniform in 1919

Many of the Arditi badges and symbols were later adopted by the fascist regime, for example a badge depicting a skull with a dagger clenched between the teeth. The anti-fascist Arditi del Popolo also had their own badge (skull with red eyes and dagger). Their battle cry was A Noi! ('To Us!'), which was later adopted as one of the phrases commonly used when making the Roman salute and originated as a duelling challenge during the Renaissance.

== Equipment ==
Typical equipment of the Arditi was the dagger for hand-to-hand combat, and hand grenades. The grenades were used to create panic and confusion as well as for their disruptive effect. The Thevenot hand grenade frequently used by the Arditi was well suited for assaults, not being overly powerful, but very noisy so as to provoke fear in the opponents. Other weapons included Fiat Revelli Mod. 1914 machine guns and flame throwers. The carbines used by the Arditi were the Carcano Moschetto 91 and Moschetto 91 TS. The Arditi also used 37 mm and 65 mm cannons against pillboxes and fortifications.

Furthermore, one of the most important weapons of the Arditi was the FIAT Machine-Pistol Model 1915. This fully automatic double-barreled weapon chambered for the 9mm Glisenti was initially used, with poor results, as a normal machine gun but, thanks to Bassi's intuitions, it was understood how to best exploit the VP which quickly became an integral part of the Arditi's shock tactics.

Used on the move without a crew and carried by a trained Ardito called pistolettiere, the Villar Perosa led the assaults accompanying the rest of the unit with its high rate of fire and contributing greatly in clearing the trenches. The Italian military, preceding the German MP18 by a year, had already begun to outline the concept of "SMG" in 1917.

In the Museo del Risorgimento in Turin, the hall is dedicated to the resistance against Fascism. There are on display a dagger and a hand grenade belonging to the Arditi del Popolo. Due to lack of resources the daggers were manufactured from surplus stock of the bayonets from the Vetterli rifle.

Equipment of the Arditi
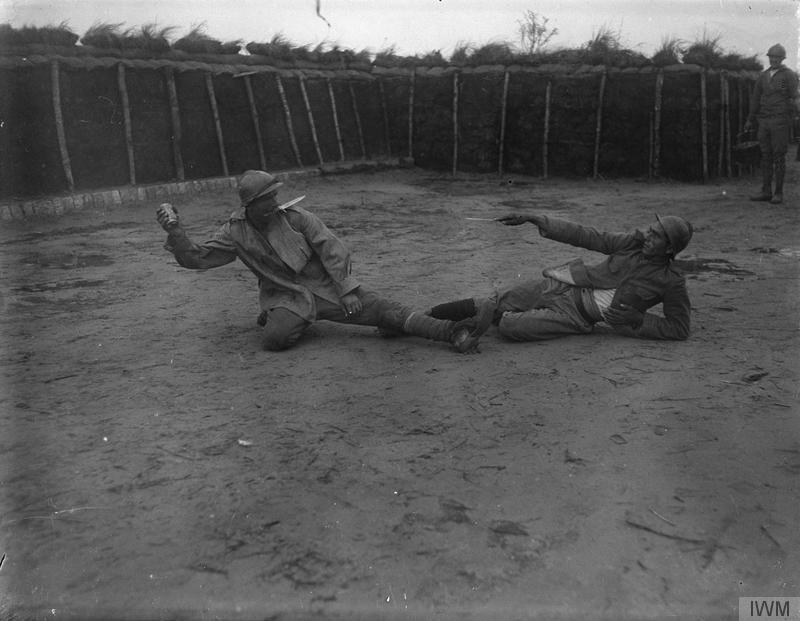
Arditi illustrating a fight with dagger and hand grenades

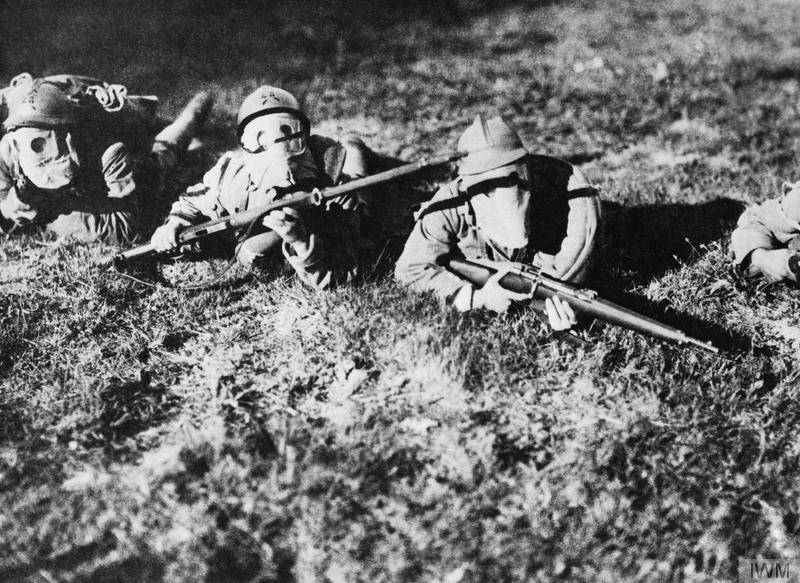
Arditi troops wearing gas masks

== Organization ==
The organization of the Arditi units varied somewhat during the war. The structure of the original Assault Battalions, created in July 1917 within the 2nd Army, was personally designed by Lieutenant Colonel Giuseppe Bassi and spread throughout the other armies in the months preceding Caporetto. Later on 21 September 1917 the Supreme Command issued a circular titled Equipaggiamento, armamento e composizione organica dei riparti d'assalto ("Equipment, armament and organic composition of the assault units"), with the clear goal of standardizing and formalizing the Arditi formations across the various Armies. However, since the majority of the Assault Battalions were already structured on Bassi's norms, the reformed organization remained only on paper and the Commands were able to put the new structure into practice ony in the winter 1917-1918.

Original Assault Battalion (July-October 1917):

Command: Major

│

├── Assault Company I

│ ├── Assault Platoon 1

│ │ ├── I Attack Squad

│ │ ├── II Attack Squad

│ │ ├── III Pistolettieri Squad (2 VPs)

│ │ └── IV Assault Squad

│ ├── Assault Platoon 2 (same as 1)

│ ├── Assault Platoon 3 (same as 1)

│ ├── Assault Platoon 4 (same as 1)

│ └── Specialist Platoon

│ ├── HMG Section (2 HMGs)

│ ├── Engineer Squad

│ └── Sapper Squad

│

├── Assault Company II

│ └── (same as Company I)

│

├── Assault Company III

│ └── (same as Company I)

│

├── Assault Company IV

│ └── (same as Company I)

│

├── Flamethrower Section with 15 portable flamethrowers (Battalion)

│

│

└── Mountain Artillery Section with 2 guns (Battalion)

Reorganized Assault Battalion (November 1917-November 1918):

Command: Major

│

│

├── Assault Company I

│ ├── Assault Platoon

│ │ ├── Attack Squad

│ │ ├── Attack Squad

│ │ └── Attack Squad

│ ├── Assault Platoon

│ ├── Assault Platoon

│ ├── Assault Platoon

│ ├── Machine-Pistol Section I

│ │ └── (2 Villar Perosa machine-pistols)

│ ├── Machine-Pistol Section II

│ │ └── (2 Villar Perosa machine-pistols)

│ ├── Machine-Gun Section

│ │ └── (2 machine-guns)

│ └── Flamethrower Section

│ └── (6 portable flamethrowers)

│

├── Assault Company II

│ └── (same structure as Company I)

│

├── Assault Company III

│ └── (same structure as Company I)

│

└── Mortar Section (Battalion)

└── (usually 4 Stokes mortar, earlier 6 Bettica)

== Under fascism ==
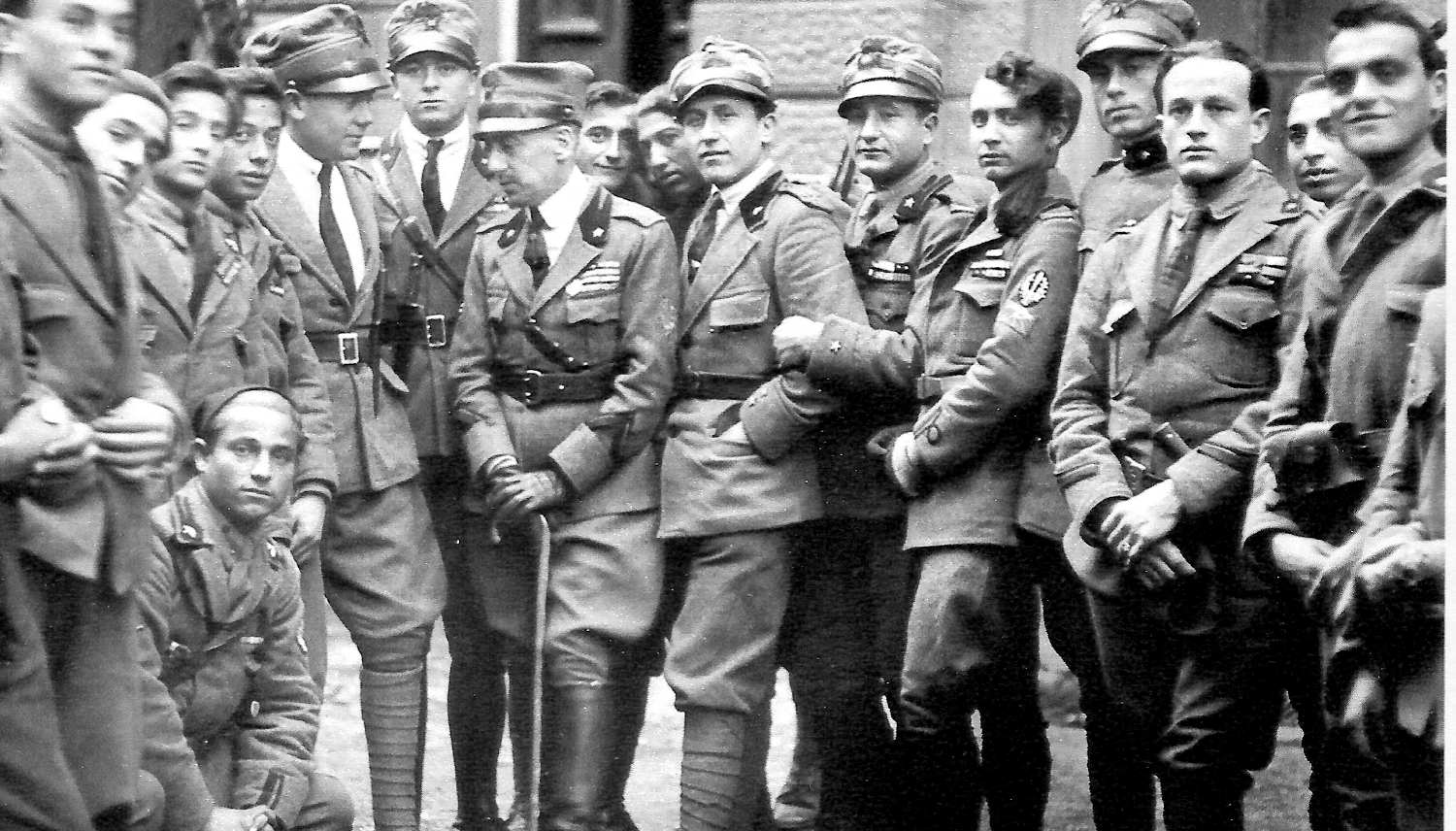
Gabriele D'Annunzio (middle, with cane) with some legionaries (components of the Arditi's department of the Italian Royal Army) in Fiume in 1919. To the right of D'Annunzio, facing him, Lt. Arturo Avolio.

In the post-World War I period, many Arditi joined the 'National Association Arditi d'Italia' (ANAI), founded by captain Mario Carli, then involved in the Futurist movement in art. Carli wrote the essay "Arditi are not gendarmes" in collaboration with Filippo Tommaso Marinetti.

A large number of Arditi joined the fascist movement, but support was not unanimous, as is clear from the Arditi del Popolo, a fringe breakaway movement of the ANAI, politically leaning to the maximalist wing of socialism. In any case, most Arditi who joined the ANAI transferred their allegiance to the FNAI (National Federation Arditi D'Italia), founded on 23 October 1922 by Mussolini. The ANAI was later dissolved.

The Arditi were active participants in Gabriele D'Annunzio's coup in the city of Fiume (now Rijeka, in Croatia). When his original plan for Italian annexation was rebuffed by the government in Rome, D'Annunzio proclaimed the founding of the "Italian Regency of Carnaro". With the trade unionist De Ambris, D'Annunzio promulgated a constitution, the Charter of Carnaro, containing strongly progressive or even radical elements. On 25 December 1920 regular Italian army troops put an end to the short-lived "regency", after brief clashes.

== The Arditi del Popolo ==
Arditi del Popolo flag

The Roman section of the Italian Arditi, in contrast to the strong but not yet consolidated movement of fascist squadrismo, became the Arditi del Popolo, a paramilitary group that was clearly anti-fascist. Its members came from anarchist, communist, and socialist movements. The Communists constituted the majority, but there were also components such as Republican Vincenzo Baldazzi (who was one of the leaders), and sometimes, as in the defense of Parma, also militants of the (Catholic) Popular Party, such as the adviser Corazza who was killed in Parma in clashes with fascist forces. The movement was born in the summer of 1921 through the work of Argo Secondari, a former lieutenant of the "Black Flame" infantry and an anarchist. The strength of these paramilitary formations were 20,000 men enrolled, among them war veterans, who were neutral or strongly anti-fascist.

Perhaps the most resonant event was the defense of Parma against fascist squadrismo in 1922: around 10,000 squadristi, first under the command of Roberto Farinacci, then Italo Balbo, had to withdraw from the city after five days of clashes against a group consisting of socialists, anarchists and communists, controlled by the heads of the Arditi del Popolo (350 took part in the battle against the fascists) Antonio Cieri and Guido Picelli. The Fascists lost 39 men, the Arditi del Popolo five.

In the following months, many heads of the Arditi del Popolo were jailed or killed by fascist squadristi, sometimes with the collusion of police agencies.

== World War II ==
"Arditi skiers" (Italian: Arditi sciatori) took part in the Battle of France; they formed the Alpine battalion "Duke of Abruzzi", the autonomous unit "Monte Bianco" and the unit "Arditi Alpieri". In the African campaign, "Saharan Arditi" operated aboard AB41 armored cars and Fiat and Lancia trucks (Fiat-SPA AS37, SPA-Viberti AS42, and Fiat 634), specifically adapted to the desert context, and equipped with heavy machine guns, light 47mm and 65mm cannons, and anti-aircraft Breda 20/65 Mod. 1935 cannons.

In May 1942, the I Special Arditi Battalion was established. It was formed on 15 May with three companies, each specialized in a mode of infiltration into enemy territory. On 20 July 1942 the Arditi Regiment was established, based in Santa Severa, near Rome, and on 1 August the I Special Arditi Battalion became its first operational unit. On 15 September it was renamed the X Arditi Regiment. It operated in North Africa and in Sicily, including behind enemy lines, until its dissolution in September 1943.

The I Arditi Battalion, which was in Sardinia on 8 September, a territory not occupied by the Germans, joined the Kingdom of the South and in March 1944 became part of the IX Assault Unit of the Italian Co-Belligerent Army. In September, it was renamed the III Battalion "Col Moschin" of the 68th Infantry Regiment "Legnano", composed of 400 Arditi.

The Regia Aeronautica (Royal Air Force) also formed Arditi units: the ADRA battalion (Arditi Distruttori della Regia Aeronautica) was established on 28 July 1942, and operated during the Allied landing in Sicily. It operated after 8 September 1943, during the Italian Social Republic, with the name ADAR (Arditi Distruttori Aeronautica Repubblicana), based in Tradate. In 1944, the 1st Arditi Paratroopers Regiment "Folgore" (formerly the Paratroopers Regiment "Folgore") and the 2nd Arditi Paratroopers Regiment "Nembo" (active only with two battalions) were also established for the national republican air force.

== See also ==
- Arditi del Popolo – an antifascist organization created in 1921 by anarchist Argo Secondari
- The Milizia Volontaria per la Sicurezza Nazionale (National Security Volunteer Militia) of the Italian Fascist movement
- Stormtroopers (Imperial Germany)

== Sources ==
- Behan, Tom (2003). The Resistible Rise of Benito Mussolini. London: Bookmarks. ISBN 978-1-898876-90-8. (account of the book in Socialist Worker review).

Italian language

- Balsamini, Luigi (2002). Gli Arditi del Popolo. Dalla guerra alla difesa del popolo contro le violenze fasciste (in Italian). Casalvelino Scalo: Galzerano.
- Cordova, Ferdinando (1969). Arditi e legionari dannunziani (in Italian). Padova: Marsilio.
- Francescangeli, Eros (2000). Arditi del Popolo. Argo Secondari e la prima organizzazione antifascista (1917–1922) (in Italian). Roma: Odradek.
- Fuschini, Ivan (1994). Gli Arditi del Popolo (in Italian). Preface by Arrigo Boldrini. Ravenna: Longo.
- Rossi, Marco (1997). Arditi, non gendarmi! Dall'arditismo di guerra agli arditi del popolo 1917–1922 (in Italian). Pisa: BFS.
- B. Di Martino and F. Cappellano, I Reparti d'Assalto Italiani nella la Grande Guerra (1915 - 1918) (in Italian), Ufficio Storico dello SME, 2007.
- G. Rochat, Gli arditi della Grande Guerra. Origini, battaglie e miti (in Italian), Milano, Feltrinelli, 1981.
- Salvatore Farina, Le Truppe d'Assalto Italiane (in Italian), Il Giornale-Biblioteca Storica, Milano, 2017.
- F. Cappellano and B. Di Martino, Un esercito forgiato nelle trincee. L'evoluzione tattica dell'esercito italiano nella Grande Guerra (in Italian), Udine, Gaspari, 2008.
