= Guido Picelli =

Italian politician

Guido Picelli (9 October 1889 – 5 January 1937) was an Italian anti-fascist, politician and soldier. He was a founding member of the Arditi del Popolo and a participant in the Spanish Civil War where he died in battle.

== Biography ==
=== Early life ===
Born in to a working-class, Picelli worked as a watchmaker and later an actor. He participated in the First World War and obtained the rank of second lieutenant there as well as the Bronze Medal of Military Valor and the bronze medal of the Italian Red Cross.

Back in Parma, in 1919 he joined the Italian Socialist Party and founded the local section of the Proletarian League of Veterans. In 1920, he was imprisoned for having tried to prevent the departure of a train of grenadiers towards Albania. In 1921 he was elected deputy to parliament with the Italian Socialist Party.

=== Anti-fascist leader of Italy ===
Picelli was a founding member of the Red Guards in 1920 to defend striking workers against fascist strikebreakers. After the failure of the Red Guards, Picelli became a founder of the Arditi del Popolo, despite the opposition of the Italian Socialist Party.

On July 31, 1922, a legal strike was proclaimed throughout Italy by the Alleanza del Lavoro. In the city of Parma Picelli, together with his brother Vittorio led a united anti-fascist front consisting of communists, anarchists, socialists and republicans. Italo Balbo, a leading member of the National Fascist Party was sent to suppress the strike but his Squadristi were repulsed. Eventually martial law was declared in the city of Parma and the strike was suppressed by the military.

After the March on Rome the Arditi was dissolved, however Picelli continued his anti-fascist activities in secrecy. In 1924 he left the PSI and joined the Communist Party and was elected to the parliament.

On May 1, 1924, he was arrested a fifth time as a parliamentarian for displaying a large red flag from the balcony of the Chamber of Deputies to protest against the anticipation of Labor Day to April 21. After the kidnapping and disappearance of Giacomo Matteotti, Picelli took part in the Aventine secession. Rome he suffered several attacks by the fascists.

In November 1926, following the promulgation of the Fascist laws, Picelli and the other Aventinian deputies were declared forfeited from their parliamentary mandate. Picelli was arrested and sentenced to five years of confinement which he served in Lampedusa and Lipari.

On November 9, 1931, he was freed and from Rome, he moved to Milan with an authorization from the head of the police Arturo Bocchini, where he married his partner Paolina Rocchetti. From Milan Picelli expatriated to France.

=== Exile in France and the Soviet Union ===
In July 1932 he was arrested and expelled from France. He took refuge first in Belgium and, later, in the Soviet Union. There he taught "military strategy" at the International Lenin School. He carried out political activity for the Communist International and kept in touch with the Italian exiles and collaborated in political magazines. During his exile, he wrote three revolutionary plays which were performed in Moscow.

Picelli became a critic of the political purges within among whose victims were Italian communists, including Dante Corneli, his emigration companion who was accused of Trotskyism.

Eventually becoming a suspect himself, in March 1935 he was first fired from school, losing both the vouchers to buy food and the salary to pay the rent and finally he was sent to a factory. Feeling in grave danger Picelli requested the intervention of Palmiro Togliatti with an autograph letter dated 9 March 1935, and kept in the archives of the Comintern. Picelli wrote a letter denouncing Trotskyism and factionalism which was received positively by the Comintern and removed any suspicions of counter-revolutionary activities against him.

=== Spanish Civil War and death ===
July 1936 the Spanish Civil War broke out and Picelli requested to be allowed to leave the Soviet Union, to fight Francoist forces.

After a permit denied in September 1936, he later managed to get permission to leave the Soviet Union for Spain, but it was specified that he would not represent the Comintern in any way.

Picelli left the Soviet Union in October 1936 and reached Paris, where he made contact with Julián Gorkin of the POUM, an anti-Soviet communist party. Gorkin invited him to travel to Spain to take command of a battalion of POUM militiamen. He reached Barcelona and the communist leaders sent him a friend of his, Ottavio Pastore with the task of making him desist from taking command of a battalion of the POUM. Nevertheless, he contacted Andrés Nin, a few days later Picelli enlisted and took command of a column of 500 volunteers of the IX battalion of the International Brigades (so-called "Colonna Picelli").

In Albacete, Picelli trained the volunteers of his column for the Madrid front. On December 13, 1936, following the agreement signed in Paris for the formation of a single Italian anti-fascist legion under the political patronage of the socialist, communist and republican parties and with the help of the organizations adhering to the Italian committee for Spain, the Colonna Picelli it was incorporated into the Garibaldi Brigade.

Picelli was appointed deputy commander of the battalion and of the first company of the Italian formation. On 1 January 1937 in command of the entire Garibaldi Battalion. He conquered Mirabueno, a strategic village on the Guadalajara front.

Four days later, on January 5, 1937, at the age of 47, Picelli was fatally shot by a burst of enemy machine guns during a fight on the Mirabueno front while attempting to place a machine gun. His body was therefore abandoned and recovered only later due to the danger represented by the presence of Francoist positions.

The Spanish Republican government held a state funeral for him in Barcelona, Madrid and Valencia.
