= Formazioni di difesa proletaria =

The Formazioni Di Difesa Proletaria (transl. Proletarian Defense Formations) were Italian anti-fascist formations, born during the two-year Biennio Rosso period in Italy (1919–1920), later organized as a united front between 1921 and 1922. The birth of the workers' defense formations was contextual to the birth of the Fasci Italiani di Combattimento, created by Benito Mussolini, and to the presentation of their manifesto.

== See also ==
- Italian resistance movement
