= People's commune =

Former rural administrative division of the People's Republic of China (1958–83)

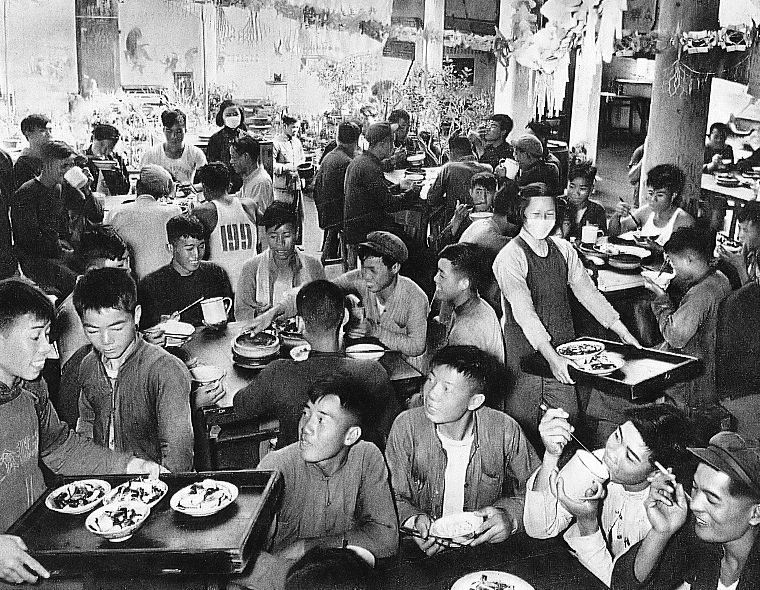
A collective meal as pictured in The 10th Anniversary Photo Collection of the PRC 1949–1959

The people's commune (Chinese: 人民公社; pinyin: rénmín gōngshè) was the highest of three administrative levels in rural areas of the People's Republic of China during the period from 1958 to 1983, until they were replaced by townships. Communes, the largest collective units, were divided in turn into production brigades and production teams. The people's commune collectivized living and working practices. Many individual homes were abolished in favour of communal residences, with many houses taken apart and demolished. Regardless of age or relationship, many men and women lived separately, and often, multiple families were placed in the same communal homes. One's land, tools, resources were pooled together, with working hours and farming practices completely dictated by the CCP.

The scale of the commune and its ability to extract income from the rural population enabled commune administrations to invest in large-scale mechanization, infrastructure, and industrial projects. The communes did not, however, meet many of their long-term goals, such as facilitating the construction of full Communism in the rural areas, fully liberating women from housework, and creating sustainable agriculture practices in the countryside. They also had governmental, political, and economic functions during the Cultural Revolution. They ranged in number from 50,000 to 90,000.

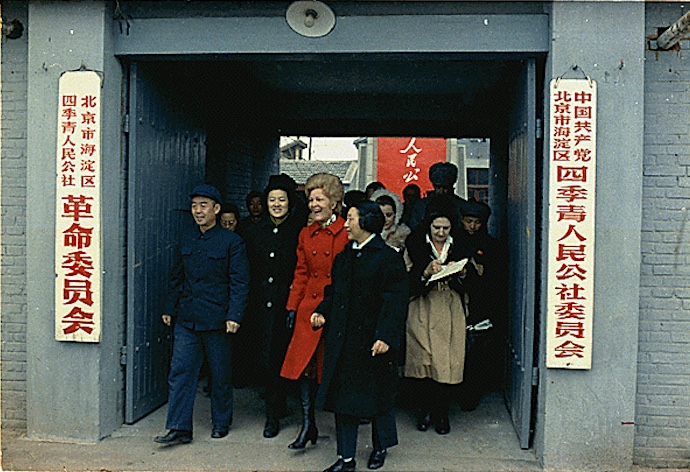
United States First Lady Pat Nixon at a people's commune in Beijing during Richard Nixon's 1972 visit to China

== History ==
=== Precedents and Collectivization in the Early PRC ===
Before the people's communes were established, the Chinese Communist Party (CCP) had experimented with and promoted other, smaller forms of collectivized agriculture. Before 1949, landlords owned almost half of the land in rural China and leased it out to tenant farmers. Many farms were relatively small, family-operated enterprises. Farmers generally went through cycles of busyness during harvest season and relative idleness during off seasons. During the Civil War era and continuing into the early years of the People's Republic of China, the CCP implemented wide-ranging land reforms, attempted to identify and classify the rural population, and redistributed land from the landlords to the middle peasants and poor peasants to revolutionize the social structure of China. After the completion of the Land Reform, individual families owned the land they farmed, paid taxes as households, and sold grain at prices set by the state.

Rural collectivization began soon after the CCP announced its 1953 "general line for the transition to socialism." Over the next six years, collectivization took several incrementally progressing forms: mutual aid groups, primitive cooperatives, and people's communes.

With state coordination, many families—up to 68 million by 1954—joined Mutual Aid Teams. These Mutual Aid Teams helped farming families coordinate the sharing of labor, farming technology, and other resources. Some Mutual Aid Teams also formed, or were consolidated into, Agricultural Producer Cooperatives (APCs), larger institutions at the village or subvillage level that pooled resources and collectively managed land.

During 1954–1955, farmers in many areas began pooling their land, capital resources, and labor into beginning-level agricultural producers' cooperatives. In the complex system of beginning-level agricultural producers' cooperatives, farmers received a share of the harvest based on a combination of how much labor and how much land they contributed to the cooperative.

By June 1956, over 60% of rural households had been collectivized into higher-level agricultural producers' cooperatives, a structure that was similar to Soviet collective farmering via kolkhozy. In these cooperatives, tens of households pooled land and draft animals. Adult members of the cooperative were credited with work points based on how much labor they had provided at which tasks. At the end of the year, the collective deducted taxes and fixed-price sales to the state, and the cooperative retained seed for the next year as well as some investment and welfare funds. The collective then distributed to the households the remainder of the harvest and some of the money received from sales to the state. The distribution was based partly on work points accrued by the adult members of a household, and partly at a standard rate by age and sex. These cooperatives also lent small amounts of land back to households individually on which the households could grow crops to consume directly or sell at market. Apart from the large-scale communization during the Great Leap Forward, Higher-level Agricultural Producers' Collectives (HAPCs) were generally the dominant form of rural collectivization in China. These cooperatives also created new administrative and economic issues, but the CCP proceeded with the collectivizing process.

In 1958, in the aftermath of the Hundred Flowers Campaign and Anti-Rightist Campaign, Mao Zedong shifted course from emphasizing economic growth toward emphasizing the rapid establishment of communism. Achieving communism, for Mao, also required economic growth but had to, at the same time, involve further collectivization and the elimination of old (or feudal) ways of living. Party propaganda outlets publicized an enormous collective in Xushui, Hebei as a "commune," in which "peasant" households had given way to communal living, and people did not have to worry about money or food. Mao visited Xushui and similar larger, purportedly very productive units in Henan province and declared, "People's communes are good." Mao and his allies in the CCP leadership continued to promote the communes both in propaganda and party meetings, and the construction of communes quickly became party line and a central pillar of the Great Leap Forward.

As the Great Leap Forward got underway, the state consolidated HAPCs into about 26,000 communes, each containing on average 4,500 hectares of land, 24,000 people, and 5,200 households. The sizes of different communes varied widely across different regions but they were consistently much larger than HAPCs had been, and the communes encompassed on average about thirty HAPCs and up to one hundred. The communes were supposed to be instrumental to the PRC's goal of "surpassing Britain and catching up to the US" in steel production.

=== Ideological and economic motivations ===
Over the summer of 1958, agricultural producers' collectives were merged into much larger collectives which comprised tens of thousands of people, typically encompassing a market town and its surrounding villages. CCP leadership called these giant administrative and economic regions "People's Communes" (人民公社), in line with the socialist and communist idea of the "commune." This term “commune” traces back to Western Europe, originally referring to autonomous cities or towns. Under the influence of Robert Owen, Friedrich Engels used this term to refer to the basic unit of organization in a Communist society, and it was seen by Karl Marx as a form of proletariat governance. Influenced by both Marx and Engels, Mao envisioned the People's Communes to be the basic unit of Chinese society made up of and ruled by the working class.

For Mao, these communes were to be characterized by their size and publicity. He wrote,

"They're called people's communes, first, because they're big and, second because they're public. Lots of people, a vast area of land, large scale of production, and all their undertakings are done in a big way. They integrate government administration with commune management to establish public mess halls, and private plots are eliminated."

In addition to this, the CCP's communes were defined by three main factors, especially during the Great Leap Forward: first, an emphasis on industrialization and productivity; second, a militarization of society, in which commune members were mobilized through military-style campaigns and exhorted to act with rigid discipline, devotion, and selflessness; and third, an ideal of self-reliance or local autonomy, such that each commune would be able to produce most of the supplies and technology that it needed to function. China hoped that people's communes would mobilize peasant labor to overcome the lack of industrialization in rural China.

This emphasis on efficient, independent, organized production and industrialization was driven by the CCP's desire to demonstrate the PRC's superiority over foreign powers. In their earlier years of rule in 1955–56, the CCP was determined to “surpass Britain and catch up with the United States.” By 1958, this competitive mindset was also applied to the Soviet Union. Mao was optimistic that the PRC would reach the true Communist society before the Soviet Union did, by increasing their productivity through a change in their production system. The People's Communes were a means to this end; the Central Committee of the CCP stating in the 'Resolution on Setting up the People's Communes in the Countryside' that China "should actively apply the method of the People’s Communes in search of a practical way to make the transition to communism now."

As the CCP Politburo declared at the 1958 Beidahe Conference, the communes were meant to bring together all key occupations and professions into one unit and, by merging them, bring about "socialist construction":

"The establishment of people's communes with all-round management of agriculture, forestry, animal husbandry, side occupations, and fishery, where industry (the worker), agriculture (the peasant), exchange (the trader), culture and education (the student), and military affairs (the militiaman) merge into one, is the fundamental policy to guide the peasant to accelerate socialist construction, complete the building of socialism ahead of time, and carry out the gradual transition to communism."

By "socialist construction," the resolution referred to the process in which the PRC was supposed to build up its industry under the vanguard Communist Party and, through the process of industrialization, accumulate enough capital and power to advance toward full communism. This meant the completion of two transitions. First, the transition from collective ownership to ownership by the whole people. Second, from distribution according to ability or labor to distribution according to need, with the self-rule of the proletariat (see also: Primary stage of socialism).

In October 1958, Mao stated that if people's communes were run well, "there is a thorough road for women's liberation. The People's communes are carrying out a wage system and a supply system under which wages are paid to each individual, not to the family head. This makes women and young people happy, and it's a way of smashing the patriarchal system, and the ideology of bourgeois right."

Mao hoped that the communes would create an "industrial army" out of the countryside, essentially turning the rural workforce into a well-disciplined engine of production. He thought this militarization would be the key to efficient production, given the supposed ease of management and control, and its potential to bolster the motivation of peasants and the working class to work.

Other members of the CCP leadership were more wary of Mao's plan for rapid agricultural modernization, and they pointed out the potentially prohibitive costs of this process and resources that it would require (such as iron, steel, and petroleum), and they argued that agricultural modernization might lead to unemployment given that rural workers would not necessarily be able to find other jobs in the countryside and urban industry remained relatively small. Nevertheless, Mao's faction won out.

These debates, and the communes themselves, were oriented toward a question facing the Chinese economy in the 1950s: how could the PRC grow its industrial base when most of the population remained tied to agricultural work and small-scale sideline production for subsistence? The communes would require a great deal of coordination and at times coercion but would also, in theory, address this basic issue. By forcing people to move into these large units, the commune leadership could coordinate larger infrastructural and industrial projects more effectively, extract income from the commune residents, and allocate this capital income to the larger projects, which would in turn make the commune more productive and efficient and free up labor for further development. Thus, one of the goals of the people's commune was to improve agricultural productivity such that fewer people had to work in agriculture and could instead use their energy and resources for industrialization.

=== During the Great Leap Forward ===
In their first few years of existence, the communes created a wide range of economic, social, and administrative issues and exacerbated the Great Leap Forward famine. The CCP leadership then made major reforms to the commune structure after the Great Leap and again in the decades that followed in order to make them more stable, productive, and efficient. Regardless of the stated goals of the communes, however, the PRC economy at the time was not oriented toward the countryside. Most productive industry was already located in the cities, and urban residents—those with jobs in key enterprises and industries—were the best-paid and best-fed in the country. As a result, the communes existed, above all, to extract grain from the countryside to support both consumption and production in the cities, and to employ surplus population when the cities grew too large.

Communization proceeded on a largely voluntary basis, avoiding both the violence and sabotage that occurred during the Soviet collectivization. According to academic Lin Chun, China's collectivization proceeded smoothly because, unlike the Soviet experience, a network of state institutions already existed in the countryside. Academic Ken Hammond attributes the comparatively non-contentious process of collectivization in China to its gradual process in which productivity gains appeared to be made at each step.

=== After the Great Leap Forward ===
The communes also changed shape considerably over time. To address some of the early shortcomings, the central leadership quickly adopted major reforms. During the Great Leap, the leadership revised the free supply system back into a labor-based system of distribution. In late 1960, the unit of accounting through which labor and income were allocated was devolved from the people's commune to the production brigade. In many cases, these brigades corresponded to the high level agricultural producers' cooperatives that had preceded the people's communes.

In 1961, the average size of the communes was reduced to one-third of the original, and the basic accounting unit (i.e., the unit at which productivity was measured and work points were allocated) devolved from the commune to the brigade to, in 1962, the production team. In the aftermath of the Great Leap Forward, as Mao Zedong retreated from guiding the economic course of the PRC, other members of the leadership enacted additional reforms to the commune. Particularly important was the reintroduction of the "Three Freedoms": private household plots, sideline industries, and small-scale animal husbandry. These "freedoms" enabled commune residents to maintain some basic subsistence measures outside of their commune work, and, as the communes became more efficient, commune residents were increasingly able to spend more time developing their own projects. Newly built communes did not retain the collectivized living arrangements and allowed for separate family spaces, even if residents still lived in large, central complexes.

The production team remained the unit of account until agricultural was totally decollectivized between 1979 and 1982.

== Commune life ==
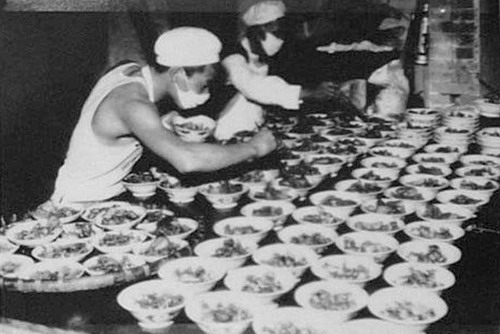
A kitchen in a people's commune from 1958 during the food's preparation

=== Layout and provision of services ===
People's communes were much more communal than the collectives that had been merged into them. In their most ambitious Great-Leap form, the communes were supposed to make nearly all domestic labor (cooking, taking care of children, education, washing, etc.) communal. In the early stages of the Great Leap Forward, the communes supplied some goods and services for free, such that food in the communal dining halls would be available for whoever wanted it rather than allocated based on workpoints or one's own household possessions. This system was known as "free supply."

Mao also considered militias and military-style organization essential to the success of the communes, and he promoted communization as a process of "militarization, combatization, and disciplinization." As Mao saw it, a spirit of militarized organization, sacrifice, dedication, and selflessness would enable the Chinese people to overcome production bottlenecks through sheer effort. Each commune had a "people's militia," a group of commune members who took on military-style roles, adopted military terminology, and were responsible for organizing the commune population, defending the commune, and ensuring that commune members followed directives and maintained appropriate political behavior. The height of militarized fervor subsided after the Great Leap Forward, but the "people's militias" continued to shape commune life and organization thereafter, especially during the Cultural Revolution.

During the Great Leap Forward, the process of bringing people into the communes, or communization, successfully uprooted traditional ways of farming and living but often failed to replace them with viable or productive alternatives. People had to give up their personal belongings, including everyday items such as farming and kitchen tools to smelt in "backyard steel furnaces." These items were supposed to be useless scrap materials, but cadres and other zealous commune members encouraged people to contribute more and more items, to the extent that some communities melted down all of their pots and pans. The resulting steel and iron was mostly useless, and people who had to make steel could not spend as much time working in the fields. When, for a variety of structural and environmental factors (see also: Great Leap Forward), a larger famine set in, this shift from agricultural work to unproductive industrial labor only worsened conditions in the communes.

Some communes, such as the Macheng commune in Hubei (which was held up as a "model commune" at the national level, see also: Macheng), also demolished tens of thousands of private residences in order to bring about collective living arrangements and improve production efficiency. Macheng commune leaders also destroyed gravesites in order to open up more land for cultivation. Such destruction, the relative lack of compensation, and the lack of actual production increases all made the communization process incredibly disruptive and even deadly. In Raoyang Village in Hebei Province, the communization process also alienated villagers as cadres ended the temple fair, destroyed temples, cut back on traditional opera, and forced the local market to mostly close, all of which prevented villagers from engaging in traditional rites and celebrations. In the process of enforcing these new regulations, some cadres also abused their power and assaulted or humiliated villagers.

Communes were supposed to rationalize the working lives of rural residents, for example by spacing out new residential areas evenly rather than adhering to traditional village boundaries. With these new spatial plans, commune administrations aimed to reduce the amount of walking time required for farmers to get to their fields. But, in the frenzied and militarized atmosphere of the Great Leap Forward, rural residents were organized into "production armies" and might spend most of their time walking around between work sites, as they were tasked with too many different non-agricultural projects at once.

Conditions varied widely from commune to commune. The most immediate constraint on communal "free supply" was the availability of resources and the commune members' willingness to participate in the new collective institutions. Commune members had a range of reasons to resist or express discontent with the communization process, largely due to either the inadequacies and inefficiencies of the commune system itself or the disruptive and destructive process by which the communes were first created. Some issues that arose for commune members included: overwork on non-agricultural projects (at the expense of subsistence-oriented farming), inefficient or counterproductive infrastructure projects (such as the backyard furnaces), lack of food at the communal dining halls, negligent educational and childcare services which created additional housework burdens for women, excessive and obligatory political study sessions, and confusing incentive structures for production. Additionally, because markets were closed and sideline industries were banned, people could not turn to some of the traditional methods of dealing with economic and agricultural hardship.

Despite these instances of resistance, there were no large-scale uprisings against the commune system as a whole. Scholars such as Joshua Eisenman write that this lack of massive resistance indicates that the commune system, with its post-Great Leap Forward adjustments, ended up serving the basic purposes of, first, feeding the countryside, and, second, extracting enough income from rural residents to fund modernizing projects and free up labor. Restrictions on individuals' mobility, however, would have made it extremely difficult for potential dissidents to coordinate resistance to the communes at a regional or provincial level, and the Anti-Rightist Movement had severely undermined people's willingness to openly criticize the party.

The conditions on communes varied considerably by geographic location. Different provincial administrations were more or less zealous in pursuing communization. Different provinces also did not have the same resources at their disposal for communization, and the Great Leap famine's severity depended on local weather, grain extraction for exports (or requisitioning for internal trade), and the response or lack thereof from local officials. At the commune level, variation might also depend on the local geography or the layout that the commune organizers preferred. For example, some communes such as the Panyu people's commune in Guangdong province were organized around a central spatial axis such as a main road or a mountain range, and residences were built near the main production facilities. Other communes were built instead with a focus on public facilities such as canteens, performance spaces, and community centers. These differences in spatial organization could then affect the daily lives of commune residents, as they might spend more time working on industrial projects as opposed to in political or cultural meetings, or, depending on the layout of their commune, they might spend additional time transiting between the two.

=== Rural healthcare ===
For a number of years after the establishment of the people's communes, healthcare stations were developed as fee-for-service hospitals to cover several large production brigades.

During the Cultural Revolution, Mao emphasized the need to improve medical care in rural China. The Rural Cooperative Medical System (RCMS) developed in the late 1960s. In this system, each large production brigade established a medical cooperative station staffed by barefoot doctors. The medical cooperative stations provided primary health care. For treatment of major diseases, rural people traveled to state-owned hospitals.

=== Urban communes ===
During the Great Leap Forward, the CPC central leadership also pushed cities to create communes of their own, modeled on the one set up in Zhengzhou, Henan. As with the rural communes, the urban communes were designed to improve production and social cohesion by: collectivizing living arrangements and socializing domestic labor (i.e., making housework collective in order to free up female labor for other work); combining many different social, economic, cultural, and political institutions in the same space (i.e., the commune); and thereby pushing the PRC forward on the road to socialism. As the CCP Central Committee put it,

The urban people's commune will be the tool for transforming old cities into new socialist cities and the organizer of production, exchange, distribution and welfare in people's lives, as well as the social organization which would combine industrial, agricultural, military, educational and trade circles and eventually merge government administration with commune management.

Production and labor, especially female labor, were essential to these "socialist cities," as the first Zhengzhou Commune statute made clear: the commune would "[push] forward the elimination of private property and the complete liberation of productive forces, in particular women's productive force." To view the communes as liberatory, the CCP leadership had to assume that the labor women already did inside and outside the home was not sufficiently or meaningfully productive, and that the act of working in factories or other industrial projects would free women from patriarchal household structures.

The urban communes did create new communal institutions and these institutions garnered some popularity, but the main outcome of the urban communes in the short run was—in addition to new services—disorder, inefficiency, and frustration. According to official statistics from 1960, the urban communes created: 53,000 public canteens, 50,000 nurseries, and 55,000 service centers that provided for other daily needs (such as laundry, repairing, and cleaning). The boundaries between workers and managers were loosened and the welfare benefits associated with a work unit (danwei) were extended to migrants and women through a large employment program. Such changes represented an enormous expansion of urban welfare benefits, in contrast with the relatively restricted welfare policy the PRC pursued before and after this period.

The communes, and the state as a whole, were not able to sustain such expansion either financially or organizationally. At the same time, the members of the communes, as in the countryside, were mobilized to achieve huge production quotas and other political and manual work. The urban communes were relatively productive, even with some waste and overproduction, but in cities such as Beijing and Shanghai, people began to complain that the commune services were subpar or incompetent and the work was excessive (especially for women who often continued to have to do housework), and the expenditure on welfare made the communes unprofitable as a whole. By late 1961, many people in these cities had stopped using commune services, and the communes closed down some of their amenities. Ultimately, although the communes were economically unsustainable and socially disruptive, some city residents lamented their closure, as they had provided jobs or amenities that the existing, more limited welfare system did not.

In addition to the failure of the communes to provide the services they had intended to collectivize, the urban communes also ran up against economic issues surrounding housing and urban construction. Three developments were particularly important: first, during the Great Leap Forward, a large proportion of public funding was allocated for capital construction (e.g., factories, mines) rather than housing construction, and so cities had relatively little money with which to construct new, durable housing. Second, the construction of housing was especially pressing because the Great Leap Forward had freed up a great deal of the rural workforce to move into the cities to work in industry, leading to a shock of urbanization. And third, Great Leap-era plans for urban construction were highly ambitious, both in the scope of construction and the economizing techniques that builders were supposed to rely on, given that more resources were being directed to industrial projects. Thus, Great Leap Forward policies exacerbated demand for new urban housing but did not provide funding to meet that demand and instead pushed the construction projects to rely on non-industrial materials (such as bricks) and the recycling of materials, either from demolished buildings or leftover from other projects. The idea that urban communes would both promote production and reorganize living space within the same institutions ran up against an economic contradiction, namely that Great Leap policies provided resources for the former (production) but not the latter (living space). Hence, when the central leadership decided to address the economic crisis, one of the major steps they took to lessen the cost of welfare provision was to lay off urban workers and step up the process of "ruralization," sending these workers to the countryside.

Unlike the rural communes, the urban ones did not last after the Great Leap Forward. The urban communes, however, still had lasting effects on urban planning, as, for example, with the Beijing city plan of 1958. This plan featured radical changes to the urban landscape, including an emphasis on communal construction and the destruction of walls, and, although the central leadership never officially approved this plan, urban planners continued relying on it up until the Cultural Revolution. The urban communes also represented the peak of the PRC's urban welfare provision, and the economic untenability of this system led the CCP leadership to enact policies reinforcing and sharpening the rural-urban divide.

In the people's commune, many things were shared. Private kitchens became redundant, and in some counties items in the private kitchen such as tables, chairs, cooking utensils and pans were contributed to the commune's kitchen. Private cooking was discouraged and supplanted by communal dining.

== Impact ==
The rural cooperative movement replaced village power structures influenced by kinship and community elites with a formalized administrative system. The process linked families and individuals to national policies, creating what academic Cai Xiang describes as a new social space.

Collective labor created possibilities for women to leave the home and increase their personal and economic independence.

During the Great Leap Forward, the communes contributed to the widespread famine conditions, as the communes overworked their residents, confiscated necessary everyday items, and misallocated labor and resources on unproductive projects over basic foodstuffs. With the adjustments made to the communes after the Great Leap, however, they did contribute to the PRC's relatively substantial growth in agricultural productivity over the remaining years before decollectivization. The work point system did not always provide clear incentive structures for commune workers but the value of the work points was calculated in such a way that the commune took roughly half the laborer's income before they turned the work points into material goods. Using this extracted capital, the communes were able to invest in mechanization, infrastructure, irrigation, soil reclamation, and other large-scale projects that required large amounts of investment and labor. Moreover, the communes continued to provide some basic services such as education and health services, and the industrial projects built on some communes gave commune members technical skills they would not have gotten otherwise.

The communes also had lasting negative effects. The experiences associated with communization and the Great Leap Forward created lasting traumas for whole communities and especially the women who were responsible for taking on additional labor and were often the first in a family to go hungry. Destruction of gravesites made it difficult for families to continue forms of ancestor worship that they had been practicing for centuries, even after the Great Leap ended. Some of the land reclamation and irrigation projects successfully made agricultural land more productive, but the top-down nature of the commune structure often meant that commune or brigade leadership determined these projects without consulting the commune members on whether these projects were useful to them. Moreover, some of the projects that communes undertook to make their land more productive, such as the use of pesticides and chemical experiments, could also have had deleterious long-term effects on the environment and the local population.

During the years between the end of the Great Leap Forward and decollectivization in the early 1980s, the PRC's agricultural productivity, rural school enrollment, infant mortality rates, and life expectancy all improved. Collectivization of land via the commune system also facilitated China's rapid industrialization through the state's control of food production and procurement. This allowed the state to accelerate the process of capital accumulation, ultimately laying the successful foundation of physical and human capital for the economic growth of China's reform and opening up.

In a 1959 analysis, Arrigo Cervetto argued that the People's Communes in China represented a transitional phase toward capitalism rather than an immediate step toward socialism. He contended that while the communes appeared pre-capitalist in structure, their financial centralization and industrialization efforts aligned with capitalist development. According to this perspective, the communes facilitated the concentration of resources and labor necessary for economic modernization, reflecting a broader historical process in which societies must develop capitalist structures before progressing toward socialism.

== Gallery ==
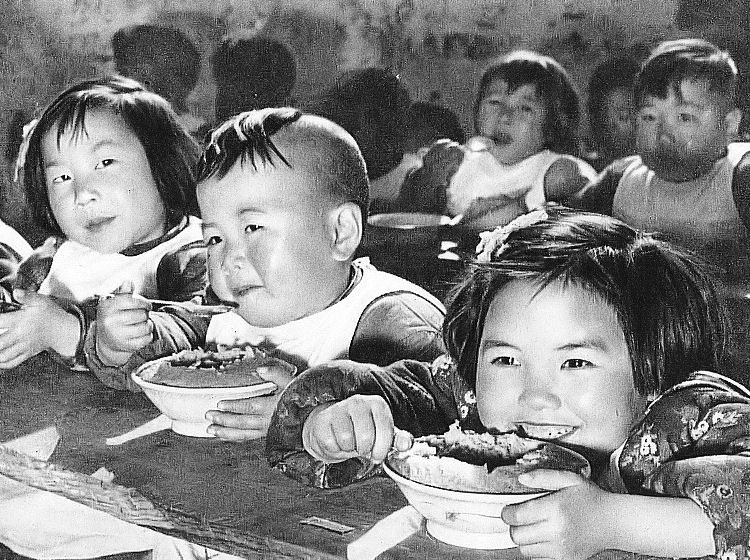
Children eating at a nursery school in a people's commune

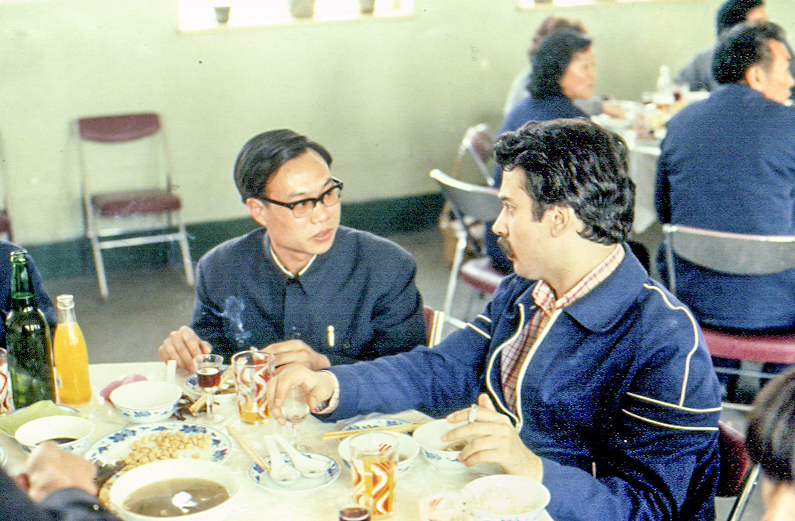
Hungarian journalist Ferenc Sarkadi Kovács at a people's commune

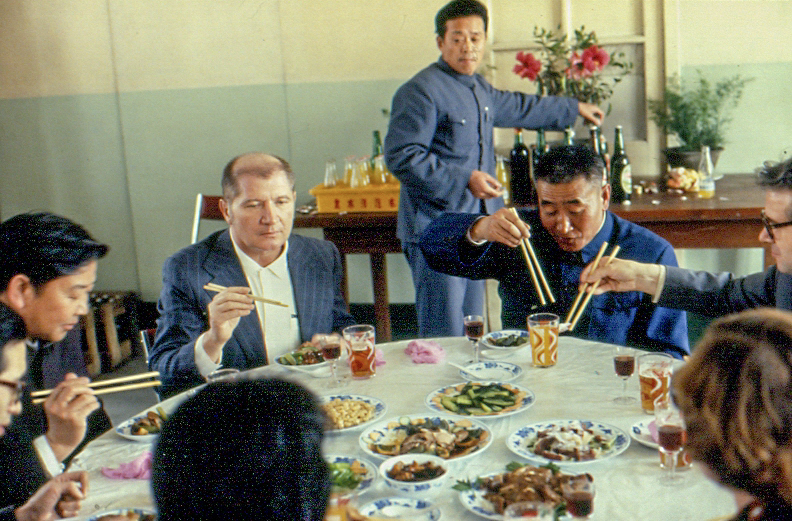
A meal being eaten during a state visit of Hungary to China inside a people's commune during meal hour.

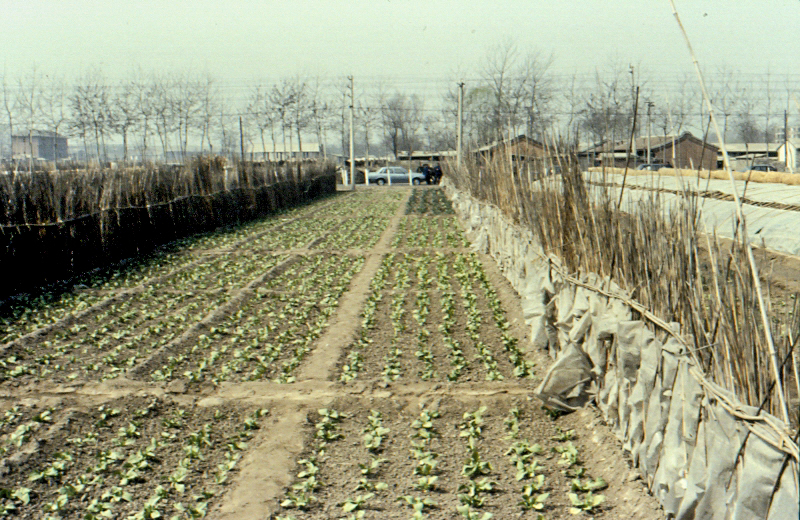
An example of a people's commune collective farm

A CIA film on life in a people's commune from 1958

== See also ==
- Work unit, China
- Chinese Peasants' Association
- Nanjie, reported to be the last Maoist village in China
- Zhoujiazhuang Township, reported to be the last remaining people's commune in China

== References and further reading ==
- Yang, Dali. Calamity and Reform in China: State, Rural Society, and Institutional Change since the Great Leap Famine. Stanford University Press, 1996.
- Schurmann, Franz (1966). Ideology and Organization in Communist China. Berkeley: University of California Press. ISBN 9780520011519.
