= Lorenzo Parodi =

Italian politician

- Born: May 24, 1926; Genoa, Kingdom of Italy
- Died: July 31, 2011 (aged 85); Genoa, Italy
- Occupations: Trade unionist; politician; writer
- Known for: Co-founder of Lotta Comunista
- Notable work: Cronache operaie (Worker's Chronicles)
- Political party: Lotta Comunista (1965–2011)
- Movement: Left communism, Leninism

Lorenzo Parodi (Genoa, 24 May 1926 – Genoa, 31 July 2011) was an Italian trade unionist, communist revolutionary and politician, founder in 1965 of Lotta Comunista with Arrigo Cervetto.

== From the small workshop to Ansaldo ==
Lorenzo Parodi was born into a working-class family: his father "Bartolomeo Parodi" worked at the forging department "Ansaldo" of Genoa Sampierdarena. He started to work at fourteen years old in a tiny bolt of Genova Nervi; in the midst of World War II, Lorenzo goes to the big factory, and the professional apprenticeship comes before the first political experiences just over a year. Lorenzo Parodi starts to work at Ansaldo as a turner in the department "small cars" (MAPI) in the summer of 1942. Half a century later, introducing the third edition of "Cronache Operaie," he remembers," We were among the boys entered the factories in the early forties to replace the "cannon fodder" sent to front ."

== The first political experiences in the fire of World War ==
In the spring of 1943, Lorenzo Parodi joined the strike in progress at Ansaldo, and in 1944, he was forced to leave the factory to escape the Nazi raids and deportation. Parodi becomes partisan in SAP Brigade "Crosa" of Genova Nervi: here his political novitiate starts; due to his anti-Stalinist choice, he meets the young libertarian communists of Nervi like Antonio Pittaluga, Vero Grassini, Agostino Sessarego, and Mario Vignale and later the group of Genoa Sestri.

It is mainly "the refusal of Togliatti's opportunism" and the attempt "still confused to salvage the savable from the opportunistic wave that will block and overwhelm the class movement emerged from the struggle against fascism" the factors that will approach him and his group to libertarian and anarchist ideas.

== The process of political maturation in the postwar ==
The young Parodi returns to Ansaldo at the end of the war. His political work is expressed in the commitment to bring the anarchist movement on a line of concrete political struggle; with Arrigo Cervetto and other people like them, he works for the foundation of the "Anarchist Groups of Proletarian Action" (GAAP), enshrined in the Convention of Genoa Pontedecimo of February 1951. "It is the search for another communism that was not the subjection to Moscow of stalinian PCI that will connect Lorenzo Parodi and Arrigo Cervetto between 1948 and 1949. The meeting land was an attempt of Pier Carlo Masini and Cervetto to group around the young of the FAI Italian Anarchist Federation in a libertarian communist movement, organized and federated, to leave the traditional anarchist individualism.

The research for 'homogeneity as theoretical science of revolution' directs him to a serious study of "Capital" in Marx and to study Lenin.

== The Internationalist position on the uprising in Budapest ==
The presence in the National Steering Committee of the CGIL provides the grandstand for a clear internationalist position on the workers' revolt in Budapest of October and November 1956. After he deplored Russia's military intervention expressed in October, the Secretary-General Di Vittorio made a rapid march back. Lorenzo Parodi supports the uprising in Budapest in connection with other significant events of that crucial 1956 (the Revolt of Poznan, the colonial war conducted in Algeria by the government of Guy Mollet, the Suez Crisis).

== The confluence in Azione Comunista ==
After the confluence of the GAAP, in spring 1957, in the group of "Azione Comunista" founded two years earlier by a "dissident" of PCI, Parodi is committed to the side of Arrigo Cervetto against the Maximalism of the group to attest an internationalist position, he presents with Cervetto, at the first conference of the Communist Left November 1957 in Livorno, the "Theses on imperialist development, the duration of the counter and on the development of the class party," that is now expressed in an organic strategic vision of the current Leninist.

== The Foundation of Lotta Comunista ==
The strategic task for the proletariat, the class that can and should revolutionize the imperialist society, is now clearly outlined in the vision that Parodi shares with Cervetto's vision. The strategic vision of the Theses of '57 is linked to the conception of the party's strategy: Cervetto sent to Parodi in 1964 the drafts of the study (which will be collected two years later in the volume, with the title of "Class Struggles and revolutionary party," and over again until the sixth edition of 2004, which also republishes those letters) on the Leninist concept of political action, to have 'a text-based current Leninist in Italy". On that basis, Cervetto and Parodi can turn the page on the experience of "Azione Comunista" in December 1965, the year of the first issue of "Lotta Comunista" (which will Parodi director until his death) and begins an extensive work of settlement organization.

== See also ==
- Arrigo Cervetto
- Lotta Comunista
