= New America Media =

News agency

- Founded: 1996
- Founder: Pacific News Service
- Dissolved: 2017
- Location: San Francisco, California
- Region served: United States
- Key people: Franz Schurmann, Sandy Close

New America Media (NAM) was a multimedia ethnic news agency and a coalition of ethnic media. Founded in 1996 by the nonprofit Pacific News Service, NAM was headquartered in San Francisco, with offices in Los Angeles, New York and Washington, D.C.

New America Media ceased operations in 2017.

== History ==
New America Media represents the third generation of ethnic news coalitions descending from the nonprofit Pacific News Service (PNS), founded in 1969. PNS was created by historian Franz Schurmann and journalist Orville Schell as an alternative news source on the United States’ role in Indochina during the Vietnam War. After the war ended in 1974, PNS shifted its lens from the Far East to the American West under the guidance of executive editor Sandy Close, who would become the organization’s executive director.

In 1991, PNS created its first youth media project, YO! Youth Outlook, a multimedia collective of youth-centric news content. YO! published a monthly print magazine, hosted youth forums, speakouts, and blog-a-thons, offered youth journalism internships, and produced live radio and YO!TV broadcasts. YO! Magazine and YO!TV disbanded in 2015.

In 1996, PNS became New California Media. NCM maintained PNS’s status as an alternative news source providing support for ethnic media voices, and expanded it with editorial and marketing workshops for ethnic media at the organization’s annual Expo & Awards, dubbed the “ethnic Pulitzers” by The NewsHour with Jim Lehrer. NCM also initiated multilingual polling on issues affecting ethnic Californians: the role of ethnic media in their daily lives, the impact of the September 11 attacks, the progress of American race relations.

Also in 1996, Sandy Close co-founded The Beat Within with social worker David Inocencio. The Beat provides a weekly writing and discussion program in Bay Area juvenile detention centers, and from those programs, compiles material into a weekly magazine of written and visual work by incarcerated youth. The Beat model has expanded into over 40 Bay Area juvenile halls, with pilot programs in several other regions including Washington, D.C.

In 2005, the organization expanded from New California Media into New America Media. The James Irvine Foundation has called NAM “...the most diverse media organization in the country”, and Sandy Close has been honored with a 1995 MacArthur Fellowship, a 2008 Ashoka Senior Fellowship, the 2010 career award from the George Polk Awards, and the 2012 I. F. Stone Medal from the Nieman Foundation for Journalism.

New America Media ceased operations in 2017.

== Youth programs ==
NAM’s youth programs include:

• YO! Youth Outlook (1991–2015)

• The Beat Within

• Silicon Valley De-Bug, a multimedia online magazine by and for South Bay Area youth

• Roaddawgz, a drop-in space and artistic outlet for homeless San Francisco youth

• The kNOw, a Fresno-based youth multimedia program

• The California Council for Youth Relations, which seeks to connect at-risk youth with decision and policy makers
