= Circoli Operai Internazionalisti =

The Circoli Operai Internazionalisti (Internationalist Workers' Clubs) are community-based organizations in Italy associated with the leftist movement Lotta Comunista. These clubs (circles) operate primarily in cities such as Milan (5 clubs), Rome (2 clubs), Turin, Genoa and other major and industrial cities, providing services and support to working class communities, especially during crises like the COVID-19 pandemic.

== Historical background ==
The Circoli Operai originated as part of Italy's socialist and communist movement, tied to Lotta Comunista, an organization with roots in the Marxist–Leninist Internationalist movement. Their activities align with the ideals of proletarian solidarity, internationalism, and workers' rights, positioning them as a modern response to social needs within Italy's working-class communities.

== Activities and initiatives ==
The Circoli Operai are active in organizing and providing essential services to vulnerable populations. During the COVID-19 pandemic, volunteers from these clubs delivered groceries, medications, and other necessities to those confined to their homes, often the elderly or immunocompromised. They distributed aid through networks established via posters in neighborhoods, encouraging those in need to reach out for assistance.

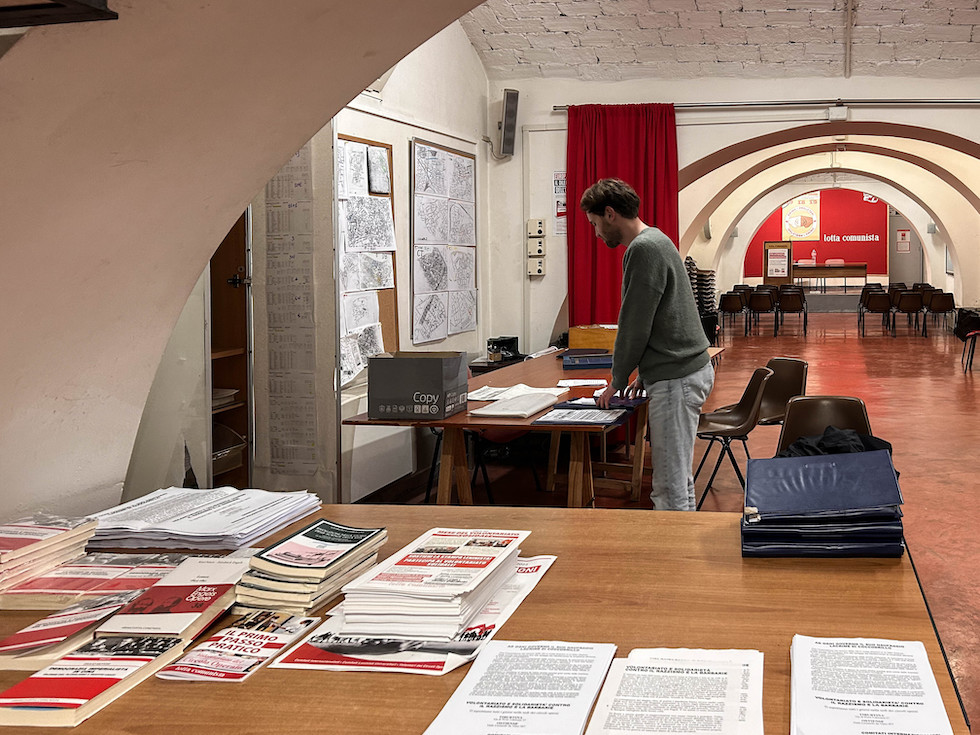
The workers' club of San Lorenzo in Rome

In Albenga, the Circolo Operaio celebrated May Day by distributing food and other aid to struggling families, a symbolic gesture reflecting their commitment to worker solidarity on the traditional day of labor celebration. In Turin, they initiated "solidarity grocery carts," allowing families to access essential items amidst economic hardship.

== Ideological influence and community impact ==
The Circoli Operai emphasize the importance of active solidarity, driven by their commitment rooted in Marxism–Leninism. They seek to create community ties that foster mutual aid and emphasize the role of the working class in societal transformation. Their activities, especially in times of crisis, have garnered attention for blending political ideology with practical support, sustaining a tradition of leftist political action within Italian neighborhoods.
