= Modern Meat =

Book by Orville Schell

Modern Meat: Antibiotics, Hormones, and the Pharmaceutical Farm
- Author: Orville Schell
- Subject: intensive animal farming and antibiotic use in livestock
- Publisher: Random House
- Publication date: 1984
- Publication place: United States
- Pages: 337
- ISBN: 978-0394518909

Modern Meat: Antibiotics, Hormones, and the Pharmaceutical Farm is a 1984 book by Orville Schell on intensive animal farming and antibiotic use in livestock.

== Reviews ==
One reviewer said that the book is a "startling introduction to today's mass-producing factory farms" but that it had the flaw of the author's "unrestrained personal bias and overdramatization of issues".

Another reviewer said that the book was controversial and "warns of subtle—but potentially dangerous—long-range effects of 'pharmaceutical farming.'"

A reviewer summarized the book's coverage as descriptions of "the indiscriminate use of ""subtherapeutic"" antibiotics in animal feeds (probably contributing to the spread of antibiotic-resistant bacteria in both human and animal hosts); the use of diethylstilbestrol and other hormones; and (more briefly) the USDA meat-inspection programs--plus the industry's search for what could be described as nonfood feeds to simplify the stoking of four-footed machines."

The National Cattlemen's Beef Association called the book "one-sided" and "seriously flawed". Consumer advocate Ralph Nader called the book "precise and gripping".
