= Ideology and Organization in Communist China =

1966 book by Franz Schurmann

- Author: Franz Schurmann
- Language: English
- Published: 1966
- Publisher: University of California Press
- Pages: 642
- ISBN: 9780520011519

Ideology and Organization in Communist China is a 1966 book by the American sociologist and sinologist Franz Schurmann that offers a sociological analysis of the Chinese Communist revolution. It was first published by University of California Press in 1966, then in enlarged editions in 1968 and 1971. Schurmann used the sociological tools developed by Max Weber to analyze Mao Zedong's "dialectical conception of Chinese society" and how Mao structured his organizational approach to the Chinese Communist Party and the government.

David Stafford, writing in the American Sociological Review called it a "near classic, widely recognized as scholarly and authoritative."

== Background ==
Schurmann left college when he was drafted into the Army in World War Two, learned Japanese in an Army language school, then without a B.A. degree enrolled in a doctoral program at Harvard. His doctoral thesis, an annotated translation of the fiscal sections of the Yuan dynasty official history, was published as Economic Structure of the Yüan Dynasty (Cambridge: Harvard University Press 1956). He eventually learned a dozen languages. He traveled to Istanbul to learn Turkish and Persian, languages which he then taught at University of California at Berkeley before gaining a position in the sociology department there.

Because Americans were not allowed to enter China in the 1950s, Schurmann did much of his research in Hong Kong. He conducted interviews with lower level officials and local cadre who came out of China and read government documents, Chinese newspapers and journals not available in the United States. He was one of a group of China watchers who used these sources to go below the level of official directives and national politics.

"After I had completed the book," Schurmann added, "I realised that I had omitted an important area of organisation: the army." Later editions included treatment.

== Themes and argument ==
The Introduction presents historical background. A century of war and revolution destroyed the gentry class that had structured society in imperial China, and discredited the ideals of Confucianism and the patriarchal family system. "Organization," Schurmann argued, "must now do for society what earlier had been done by the social system," and the Chinese Communist Party filled the void by producing “a China of organization”. The book argued that a "consistent yet changing ideology" created a web of organization that covered and penetrated all aspects of Chinese society, building on ideas and practice that were developed beginning in the 1930s.

Chapter One, "Ideology," introduces and explains key concepts and their application. "theory" (lilun), or "pure ideology," combines with "practice" (shijian) which together produce "thought" (sixiang), or "practical ideology". John K. Fairbank pointed out that in Schurmann's analysis, "theory is the unchanging world view of a class, while thought arises from action in individual minds and keeps changing". The implication of Schurmann's distinction between theory and thought, he continues, is that creation of Marxist-Leninist theory ended with Stalin, but Mao's thought has continued to develop. Mao's Thought made China independent of Stalin's successors and the distinction likewise implies that other national liberation movements can take Mao's Thought only as a model, not its own practical ideology, which they must develop independently.

Chapters on "Party", "Government", and "Management" explain swings in key policy areas. In the 1950s the Party initially adopted, perhaps with reluctance, the Soviet-style "responsibility system" and "one man management" which reinforced centralized planning, especially after the purge of Northwest China leader Gao Gang, who was associated with the Soviets. The Great Leap Forward took the goal of reviving pre-1949 success when the Party was base in Yan'an, when local Party cadre and local units took the initiative. But the failure of the Leap swung the Party back to allowing managers more control and central planners more authority.

Chapters then treat "Control", "Cities", and "Villages".

Michel Oksenberg sees three themes that illuminate Schurmann's main concerns. The first was the relationship with the Soviet Union. Up to 1956 leaders modeled most of their organizational practice on the Stalinist model, which valued central control and technical expertise. Schurmann found that this model did not fit Chinese conditions or preferences, partly because China lacked well-trained technicians, partly because responsibility in traditional Chinese organizations was diffuse, and partly because the success of the Party in coming to power had depended on guerilla fighters, who tended to be peasants and unskilled workers. These former guerilla leaders were put in charge of local units. Reaction against the Soviet model came to a head in the Great Leap Forward of 1957, which put control in the hands of these local Party cadre, whose lack of expertise and dependence on political loyalty led to disaster.

A second theme is continuity and change from traditional China. Schurmann noted that although traditional forms of control and organization had been undermined in the generations before 1949, that the government had to tolerate them in the countryside, where family farming was still strong. Schurmann predicted that these traditions would be difficult to weed out, but that two new elites had emerged – "red" elites, who were politically revolutionary, and the "experts," who had technical training. The third theme was industrialization, intensifying conflict between the "reds" and the "experts".

== Assessments and influence ==
Harry Harding's 1984 state-of-the-field article on Chinese political science in the West called Schurmann's work one of fewer than a dozen key books and articles in the first generation of scholarship. William Joseph remarks in his Politics in China: An Introduction that the book was "one of the most influential pre-Cultural Revolution studies of politics in the People's Republic of China" and that Schurmann's observation that ideology and organization and the relationship between them are the "key to understanding what was unique and comparative (especially to the Soviet Union)... is still valid, despite how much has changed about Chinese politics."

Reviewers also disagreed, commented on features, or called attention to shortcomings. Martin Bernal noted in The New York Review of Books that the book does not touch either on political education or on education in the school system, and that the analysis largely ended before the Cultural Revolution. Richard H. Solomon wrote in The China Quarterly that it is a "seminal work" and one that will "certainly stimulate further systematic analysis," adding that "if the reader approaches this volume with the author's sense of fortitude.... he [sic] will be rewarded with numerous insights and hypotheses about communism in China which are worthy of further and more rigorous testing...." The "greatest disappointment," however, "is that there is "no summary analysis of how the communists in fact combine ideology with organization" in policy-formation. Solomon asked Schurmann to explain how the decision was made, for instance, to form the people's communes in the summer of 1958. Morris Bornstein noted that the China field had established only a "scanty base" of monographic work for Schurmann's generalizations but "fortunately" Schurmann has not waited for that base but has written an "essential work," an "original and imaginative study" based on the limited information available.

Other prominent reviews include Michel Oksenberg on the front-page of the New York Times Sunday book review and Janet Salaff's 19 page review article in Berkeley Journal of Sociology (1967).
