= Sandy Close =

American journalist

Alexandra Close
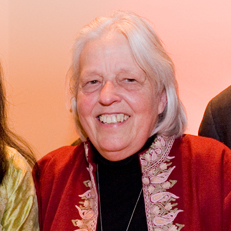
- Born: 1942 or 1943 (age 82–83)
- Other name: Sandy
- Education: University of California, Berkeley (B.A.)
- Occupation: Journalist
- Organization: Ethnic Media Services
- Partner: Franz Schurmann
- Children: 2

Alexandra Close (born ca. 1943) is an American journalist and the founder of Ethnic Media Services (now American Community Media). She was the executive director of Pacific News Service from 1974 to 2017 and of New America Media from 1996 to 2017.

== Early life and education ==
Close received her BA from the University of California, Berkeley in 1964.

== Career ==
Close worked as the China editor in Hong Kong for the Far Eastern Economic Review in the mid-1960s. Upon her return to the U.S. she co-founded Oakland-based newspaper The Flatlands. She was also a weekly commentator for Morning Edition from 1984 to 1985.

In 1991, she founded Yo! Youth Outlook, a monthly magazine of youth writing and art, and in 1996, she co-founded The Beat Within, a weekly journal written by incarcerated youth.

She served as the executive director of Pacific News Service from 1974 to the publication's closing in 2017. In 1996, she founded New America Media, which involved up to 3,000 ethnic news organizations in California, and served as its executive director until its closure in 2017.

In 2018, Close founded Ethnic Media Services, a non-profit agency focused on developing cross-cultural journalism and marketing projects to promote inclusive public discourse.

Close was a co-producer for the film Breathing Lessons: The Life and Work of Mark O'Brien, which won the Academy Award for Best Documentary (Short Subject) in 1996.

== Personal life ==
Close was married to the historian and Asian affairs scholar Franz Schurmann from 1968 until his death in 2010.

== Awards ==
- 2011 George Polk Award for Career Achievement
- 2008 Ashoka Fellowship
- 2006 Purpose Prize Fellowship
- 1995 MacArthur Fellows Program

== Works ==
- "Ben Hur" Vs. "Titanic" -- Nature Replaced God in Film That Speaks to Environmental Age, JINN, 03-26-98
- "Fear and uncertainty in the era of change", National Civic Review, Volume 98 Issue 3, Pages 46 – 47
