= Franz Schurmann =

American sociologist and historian (1926-2010)

- Born: Herbert Franz Schurmann; June 21, 1926; New York City, US
- Died: August 20, 2010 (aged 84); San Francisco, California, US
- Occupations: Sociologist, historian, author
- Employer: Pacific News Service
- Partner: Sandy Close
- Children: 2

Herbert Franz Schurmann (June 21, 1926 – August 20, 2010) was an American sociologist and historian who was best known for his research and writings about Communist China during the Cold War period.

Schurmann taught at the University of California, Berkeley, in the departments of Sociology and History for 38 years. He also served a term as the head of the Center for Chinese Studies. He was an early opponent of the Vietnam War, and was the first American professor to visit Hanoi during the bombing raids there. He co-founded the Pacific News Service in 1970 together with author Orville Schell, serving as editor and commentator, and wrote the weekly "Predictions" column.

== Early life and education ==
Schurmann was born on June 21, 1926, in Astoria, Queens, New York, and grew up in Bloomfield, Connecticut. He developed fluency in as many as 12 languages, acquiring them from his Slovenian father who spoke five languages himself, his mother who was an immigrant from Germany, and from the dialects spoken in the melting pot community where he was raised. He briefly attended Trinity College in nearby Hartford, Connecticut.

He was drafted by the United States Army during World War II and was assigned to learn Japanese, serving as a newspaper censor during the American occupation of Japan. He befriended Stefan Brecht during his Army service and met Thomas Mann and other German émigrés at the California home of Stefan's father Bertolt Brecht. After completing his military service, Schurmann attended Harvard University where he was awarded a Ph.D. in Asian studies, which he was able to attend using his G.I. Bill benefits as a veteran.

== Career ==
During the late 1950s, Schurmann spent two years exploring Afghanistan on horseback, where he documented a blue-eyed, blond-haired tribe that descended from the invasions by Genghis Khan, a history that he recounted in his 1962 book The Mongols of Afghanistan: An Ethnography of the Moghôls and Related Peoples of Afghanistan.

He was an early opponent of the Vietnam War, founding the Berkeley Faculty Peace Committee in 1965 and visiting North Vietnam with author and political activist Mary McCarthy in 1968. In 1967, Schurmann signed a letter declaring his intention to refuse to pay taxes in protest against the U.S. war against Vietnam, and urging other people to also take this stand.

His major work Ideology and Organization in Communist China was published in 1966, just as Mao's Cultural Revolution was starting, and was revised and enlarged in 1968 and 1971. A widely influential analysis, the book applied the sociological insights of Max Weber to interviews Schurmann conducted in Hong Kong with refugees and wide reading in Chinese newspapers and documents. The book demonstrates how Mao Zedong's "dialectical conception of Chinese society" structured his organizational approach to the Chinese Communist Party and the government. The book argued that a "consistent yet changing ideology" created a web of organization which covered and penetrated all aspects of Chinese society, building from the 1930s. He edited the three-volume series The China Reader with Orville Schell, a student of his who became an author and China expert in his own right. Together with Schell, he established the Pacific News Service in 1970, with the goal of providing Americans with more detailed coverage of news from Asia and Latin America. The service created New America Media in 1996, a multimedia ethnic news agency and a coalition of ethnic media organizations.

His 1974 work The Logic of World Power provided a summary of international relations following World War II. The Foreign Politics of Richard Nixon, a book he wrote in the 1970s about the U.S. President's role in foreign affairs, was published in 1987.

Schurmann wrote hundreds of columns for Pacific News Service about the development and goals of militant Islam. He was able to read written Arabic and would refer to Arabic-language press in his reporting.

== Death ==
He died at age 84 on August 20, 2010, at his home in San Francisco due to complications of Alzheimer's disease and Parkinson's disease. He and his wife of 42 years, journalist Sandy Close, had two sons.

== Publications ==
- Economic Structure of the Yuan Dynasty, 1956
- The Politics of Escalation in Vietnam with Peter Dale Scott and Reginald Zelnik. Fawcett, 1966.
- Ideology and Organization in Communist China, 1968
- Imperial China: The Decline of the Last Dynasty and the Origins of Modern China, the 18th and 19th Centuries. 1967. (with Orville Schell). First in The China Reader series.
- Republican China: Nationalism, War, and the Rise of Communism, 1911-1949 (with Orville Schell). 1967 Second in The China Reader series.
- Communist China: Revolutionary Reconstruction and International Confrontation, 1949 to the Present (with Orville Schell) (1968). Third in The China Reader series.
- China: An interpretive history, from the beginnings to the fall of Han, with Joseph R. Levenson, 1969
- People's China: Social experimentation, politics, entry onto the world scene 1966 through 1972, (1974).
- The Logic of World Power: An Inquiry into the Origins, Currents, and Contradictions of World Politics. Pantheon, 1974.
- The Foreign Politics of Richard Nixon: The Grand Design, Institute of International Studies, University of California, Berkeley, 1987.
- American Soul (a personal narrative). 2001.
