= Pacific News Service =

American non-profit media organization

- Type: News agency
- Industry: News media
- Founded: 1969; 57 years ago
- Founders: Franz Schurmann and Orville Schell
- Fate: Defunct, 2017
- Headquarters: Berkeley, California
- Area served: (1969–1974) Far East (1974–2017) California
- Key people: Sandy Close
- Products: Wire service
- Subsidiaries: New America Media (1996–2017); Youth Outlook magazine
- Website: pacificnews.org

Pacific News Service (PNS) was an American nonprofit alternative news media organization. PNS ceased operations in 2017.

The organization was located in Berkeley, California.

== History ==
PNS was founded in 1969 by historian and sociologist Franz Schurmann and Orville Schell, author, journalist and former Dean of the Graduate School of Journalism at the University of California, Berkeley. The original mission of PNS was to supply mainstream newspapers with an independent expert sources and reporting on the United States' role in Indochina during the Vietnam War.

In 1974 after the Vietnam War ended, PNS changed its objective from covering the Far East to the United States, especially California, under the guidance of Executive Editor Sandy Close.

PNS operated a news-wire service, produced documentary films and television shows, and published Youth Outlook, a monthly news magazine by and about young people. PNS focused on publishing stories written by and about those on the margins of society.

In 1995, PNS editor Sandy Close received the MacArthur Genius Award for her work in giving "voice to the voiceless" through PNS.

New America Media was founded by PNS in 1996, and served as a clearinghouse for news and feature stories from and in America's ethnic media.

On November 1, 2017, the board of directors announced that New America Media and PNS would cease operations by November 30, 2017. New America Media executive director Sandy Close said that the reason for the closure was, "we grew too fast, and were reluctant to cut off programs after their funding expired. We reached a point where we were not sustainable, as currently constituted."

== Notable contributors ==
Some noted contributors include:

- T. D. Allman, foreign correspondent who exposed CIA war in Laos, prize-winning author of Unmanifest Destiny, Miami: City of the Future, Rogue State and Finding Florida.
- Walter Truett Anderson, political scientist, social psychologist and author
- William O. Beeman, anthropologist, political analyst and author
- Jamal Dajani
- Lyn Duff
- Lucy Komisar, investigative journalist who wrote on Gladio (Italian branch of NATO "stay-behind" secret paramilitary organizations, which has been involved in terrorist "false flag" operations, starting with the 1969 Piazza Fontana bombing) and also on Clearstream scandal, one of the biggest financial scandals ever
- Andrew Lam
- Renée Montagne
- Richard Rodriguez, contributor to PBS NewsHour
- Franz Schurmann, co-founder of PNS
- Yoichi Shimatsu, former associate editor of PNS

== See also ==
- Alternative news agency
- News agency
