= Orville Schell =

American sinologist

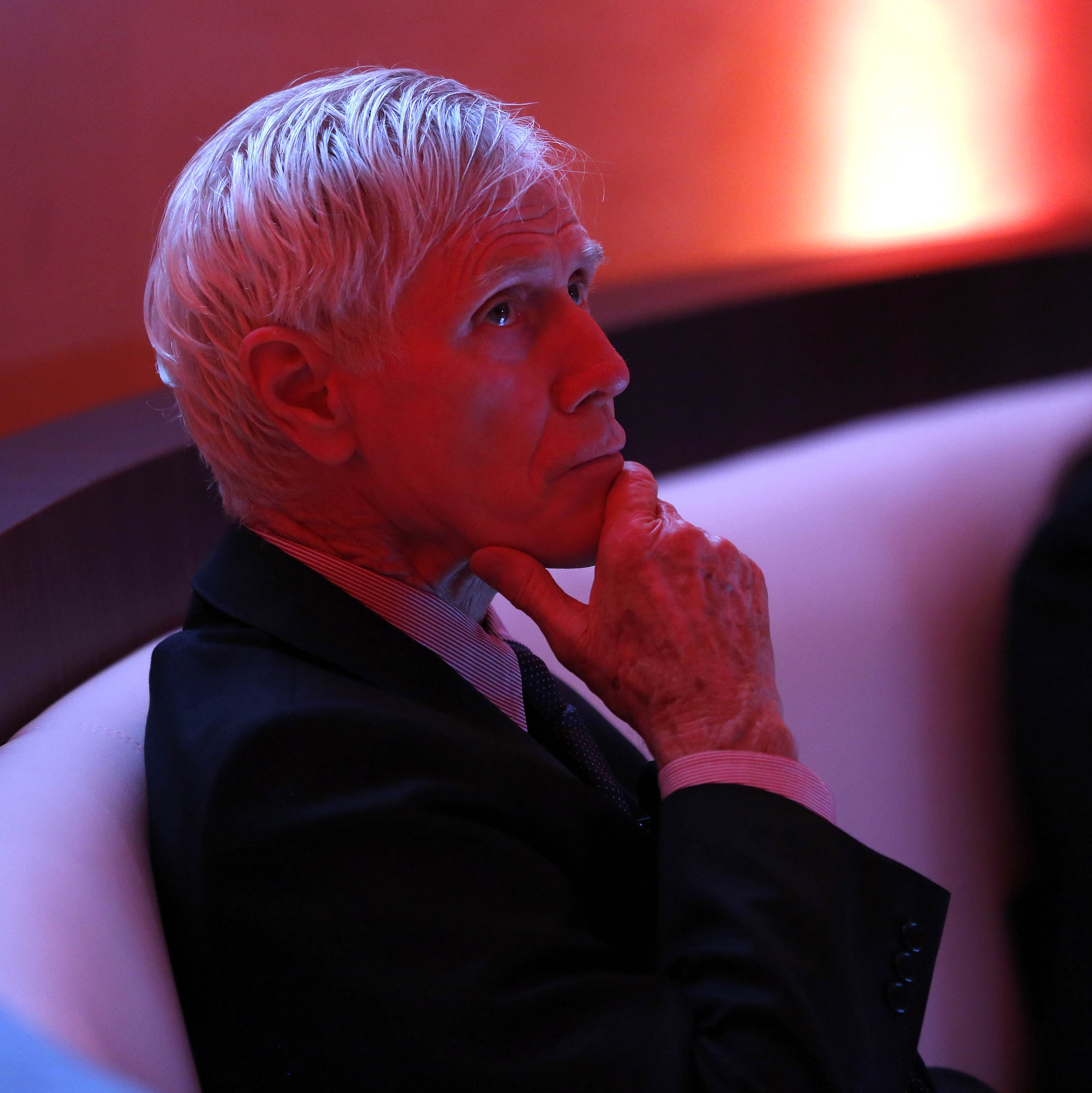
- Schell at the World Economic Forum Annual Meeting of the New Champions in 2012
- Born: Orville Hickock Schell III; May 20, 1940 (age 86); New York City, U.S.
- Education: Harvard University (BA); National Taiwan University; University of California, Berkeley
- Occupations: Writer, academic, and activist
- Writing career
- Pen name: Xia Wei (夏伟)
- Subject: China
- Notable work: The China Reader
- Notable awards: Alicia Patterson Journalism Fellowship
- Website: orvilleschell.com

Orville Hickock Schell III (born May 20, 1940) is an American sinologist. Since 2007, he has been the Arthur Ross Director of the Asia Society's Center on U.S.-China Relations. He previously served as dean of the University of California, Berkeley's Graduate School of Journalism.

== Early life and education ==
Schell's father Orville Hickok Schell Jr., was a prominent lawyer who headed the New York City Bar Association and also the New York City Ballet. The senior Schell also chaired the human rights group Americas Watch from its founding in 1981 until his death in 1987, co-founded Helsinki Watch, forerunner to Human Rights Watch, and became the namesake of the Orville H. Schell Jr. Center for International Human Rights at Yale Law School. Orville Schell III is the older brother of writer Jonathan Schell.

Born in New York City in 1940, Schell attended Pomfret School in Pomfret, Connecticut. After completing his high school education at Pomfret in 1958, Schell began attending Harvard University initially in its Class of 1962. He left Harvard in 1960 to study Chinese at Stanford University. Then from 1961 to 1962, Schell transferred to National Taiwan University to continue his studies in Chinese. While in Taiwan, Schell began writing "Man in Asia" columns for the Boston Globe. He then returned to Harvard and took Asian history, culture and politics courses under John Fairbank and Edwin Reischauer, and completed his bachelor's degree in 1964.

In 1964–65 Schell worked for the Ford Foundation in Jakarta, Indonesia. He then pursued Chinese studies at the University of California, Berkeley, earning a master's degree in 1967, becoming researcher for sociology and history professor Franz Schurmann (head of the school's Center for Chinese Studies) on a three-volume work, The China Reader (1967, Random House). Schell was named as a co-author, establishing him as a China scholar.

Schell continued his graduate studies at University of California, Berkeley, reaching an all but dissertation stage. As anti-Vietnam War protests shook the campus, he became involved in anti-war activism and journalism, and in 1967 he signed the Writers and Editors War Tax Protest pledge, vowing to refuse to pay tax as a protest against the Vietnam War.

== Journalism career ==
In 1969 Schell and Schurmann co-founded Pacific News Service (PNS) to create and distribute news and commentary from a broader spectrum of voices, especially viewpoints from abroad. The PNS was critical of the United States’ role in Indochina during the Vietnam War and supportive of establishing diplomatic relations with the PRC.

Before his 1974 departure for China, Schell had already published three books, The China Reader, Starting Over: A College Reader and Modern China: The Story of a Revolution.

In 1975 Schell and his younger brother Jonathan Schell (who later wrote the bestseller The Fate of the Earth, and joined The Nation and the Nation Institute) became correspondents at The New Yorker. Schell has also served as a correspondent for the Atlantic Monthly and the New Republic. He has written widely for many other magazine and newspapers, including The New Yorker, Time magazine, Harper's, The Nation, The New York Review of Books, Wired, Foreign Affairs, Newsweek, the China Quarterly, and The New York Times, The Washington Post and Los Angeles Times.

In 1980 Schell won an Alicia Patterson Journalism Fellowship to research and write about the reliance on drugs in the U.S. meat industry.

He has also been a co-producer for the Public Broadcasting Service (PBS) production center WGBH-TV in Boston (1984), NBC Nightly News (1987), CBS's 60 Minutes (1991), and helped produce Peter Jennings's specials at ABC Television. In 1994 he worked for the PBS documentary program Frontline.

In 1992 Schell won an Emmy Award and an Alfred I. duPont Award - Columbia University Silver Baton for producing 60 Minutes's Made in China, a documentary about the 1989 Tiananmen Square massacre. In 1997, Schell won a George Peabody Award for his production of Frontline's documentary "Gate of Heavenly Peace".

Schell's selection as Dean of the UC Berkeley Graduate School of Journalism elicited an attack from right-wing radio talk show host, Michael Savage, who alleged the head of the search committee, sociology professor Troy Duster, had refused to interview him. Savage considered himself a qualified conservative journalist for the job, and claimed that Schell's appointment constituted political patronage, which is illegal under California's labor laws. The suit also argued that a political litmus test for the deanship illegally denied public employment and First Amendment rights to a conservative applicant. The lawsuit was dropped as having little merit and when all conservative applicants withdrew from consideration.

During his tenure, Schell was responsible for the hirings of Christopher Hitchens, Michael Lewis, Cynthia Gorney, Michael Pollan, Louis Rossetto, Charles Ferguson, Barbara Ehrenreich, Mark Danner, Steve Wasserman, Stephen Talbot and Tom Engelhardt, among others.

In April 2006, Schell announced his intention to resign as dean.

Schell is now the Arthur Ross Director of the Center on U.S.–China Relations at the Asia Society in New York, which focuses on multimedia journalism, original research and public events to bring attention to areas of mutual interest to the United States and China. Since its inception, the center has focused primarily on issues of energy and global climate change. Schell oversaw "The China Boom Project", "On Thinner Ice", a joint multimedia project with David Breashears's Glacier Research Imaging Project (GRIP) and MediaStorm, and a new policy effort to maximize American interest in response to investment from China.

A frequent participant in the World Economic Forum, Schell is a member of the Council on Foreign Relations, the Climate Policy Initiative, GE's Eco Imagination Advisory Board and the Council on the Future of Media, which claims to be "championing a new global, independent news and information service whose role is to inform, educate and improve the state of the world-one that would take advantage of all platforms of content delivery from mobile to satellite and online to create a new global network".

Schell is also a senior research scholar at Columbia University's Weatherhead East Asian Institute.

== Farming career ==
Schell has criticized factory farming. In 1976 he published The Town That Fought to Save Itself, about the San Francisco suburb of Bolinas, where he has a ranch. In 1978 he co-founded the company Niman Ranch (then named "Niman-Schell") with Bill Niman with the objective of raising cattle in a humane and environmentally sound manner. He left the company in 1999. In 1984 he published the book Modern Meat: Antibiotics, Hormones, and the Pharmaceutical Farm, criticizing meat production in the United States.

== Views on China ==
Schell first visited the People's Republic of China in 1974, during the last years of Mao Zedong. After Mao's death, Schell wrote: "He conceived of the Chinese revolution, and then helped cause it to happen. And, in the process, the thought of Chairman Mao became inculcated in almost every Chinese. The word almost literally became flesh. And it seemed clear, even before Mao died, that his death could not erase the way in which he had almost become transubstantiated in his people."

In 2004 Schell called China's Communist-Capitalist mix "Leninist capitalism".

In an interview with Terry Gross of NPR's Fresh Air broadcast November 19, 2009, Schell stated that whether or not China's "autocratic capitalism" could deliver economic growth better than democracy was a question he faced "with some trepidation." He suggests the Chinese form of government may be more adaptive than democracy because it is not encumbered by the special interest power blocs found in the United States, and can sometimes be able to act more decisively to deal with the complexities of the world of today, although it can also more quickly implement poor decisions. But, he emphasized that he personally preferred living in an open society.

After Xi Jinping's ascension to power in 2013, Schell has become increasingly critical of China's authoritarian model of governance, and in 2020 wrote an essay about the "death of engagement" between the US and China.

== Publications ==
- The China Reader (with Franz Schurmann) (1967).
- Starting Over: A College Reader (1970) (with Frederick Crews).
- Modern China: The Story of a Revolution (with Joseph W. Esherick) (1972)
- Modern China: The Making of a New Society from 1839 to the Present (with Joseph W. Esherick) (1972)
- The Town That Fought to Save Itself (1976)
- In the People's Republic: An American's First-Hand View of Living and Working in China (1977)
- Brown (1978) (biography of California governor Jerry Brown)
- Orville Schell (1980). "Watch Out for the Foreign Guests!" China Encounters the West. New York: Pantheon Books. ISBN 0-394-74899-9 – via Internet Archive.
- Modern Meat: Antibiotics, Hormones, and the Pharmaceutical Farm (1984)
- To Get Rich Is Glorious: China in the Eighties (1984)
- Discos and Democracy: China in the Throes of Reform (1988)
- Mandate of Heaven: A New Generation of Entrepreneurs, Dissidents, Bohemians, and Technocrats Lays Claim to China's Future (1994)
- Mandate of Heaven: The Legacy of Tiananmen Square and the Next Generation of China's Leaders (1995)
- Virtual Tibet: Searching for Shangri-La from the Himalayas to Hollywood (2000)
- The China Reader: The Reform Years (co-edited with David Shambaugh) (1999)
- Empire: Impressions of China (2004)
- Wealth and Power: China's Long March to the Twenty-First Century (with John Delury) (2013)
- The Treacherous Silicon Triangle, Foreign Affairs, July 17, 2023 (co-authored with Larry Diamond and Jim Ellis)
- Inside China’s Secret Prisons: An Undercover Exposé and Its Lasting Legacy (New York: Columbia University Press, 2026)
