= Niman Ranch =

American meat company

Niman Ranch, Inc.
- Type: Private
- Industry: Food distribution
- Founder: Bill Niman
- Headquarters: Westminster, CO, USA
- Key people: Chris Oliviero; General Manager
- Products: Beef, pork, and lamb
- Number of employees: 60
- Parent: Perdue Farms
- Subsidiaries: Niman Ranch Pork Co.
- Website: nimanranch.com

Niman Ranch began in the early 1970s on an 11-acre (4.5 ha) ranch in a small coastal town just north of San Francisco. They produce beef, lamb, and pork.

== History ==
=== Early years ===
In 1969, Niman Ranch was founded by rancher William Ellis "Bill" Niman, a hippie and elementary school teacher, who has since left the company. He had moved from Minnesota to the small coastal town of Bolinas, California, where he purchased a ranch for US$18,000 (equivalent to $158,000 in 2025) to begin a part-time pig, goat, and chicken farming operation. His first cattle were acquired as trade for tutoring services.

=== Growth and investment ===
By 1994, the Niman Ranch company had developed a reputation for high quality beef, but demand was exceeding the company's production capacity. That same year, Niman met Iowa pork farmer Paul Willis, and they began private labeling Willis' pork under the name "Niman-Schell".

In 1997, Niman undertook an ambitious expansion aided by management changes and several million dollars of funding. That same year, investors Rob Hurlbut and Mike McConnell became owner-partners, and the company was renamed "Niman-McConnell". Hurlbut, a former manager of coffee for Nestle, became the CEO.

Orville Schell left to become dean of the UC Berkeley Graduate School of Journalism.

Subsequently, the company also accepted funding from Pacific Community Ventures, a community development venture capitalist, itself funded in large part by the California Public Employees' Retirement System (CalPERS).

In the late 1990s, revenues continued to grow, from US$3 million in 1997, to US$5 million in 1998, and to US$20 million in 2000, as Niman began to sell packaged meats in grocery stores.

=== Niman becomes a national brand ===
In 1971, when Alice Waters opened her Chez Panisse restaurant, Bill Niman sent her pork for evaluation. Waters agreed to buy pork from Niman, as well as including both the name and company logo on her menus.

In 2001, Niman entered an agreement to sell pork to the Chipotle Mexican Grill restaurant chain. To meet the demand, Paul Willis recruited hog farmers, mostly from the Midwest, to raise pigs under contract.

In 2005, Niman Ranch sold to more than 1,200 restaurants and restaurant groups.

In July 2006, Chicago-based Natural Food Holdings (part of Hilco Equity Partners) bought a major stake in the company; at the time, Niman Ranch was losing close to US$3 million a year.

In January 2009, due to bankruptcy, Niman Ranch was merged into its chief investor, Natural Food Holdings. The CEO at the time, Jeff Swain, said that the company had been making US$7,000 a week since Natural Food took over, rather than losing US$10,000 a week.

=== Bill Niman leaves Niman Ranch ===
In August 2007, Bill Niman left Niman Ranch after increasing confrontations with the new management team. Bill Niman is no longer part of the company and is forbidden to use his surname commercially.

=== Embezzlement scandal ===
In April 2010, former Niman Ranch treasurer Gary Steven Gross was indicted by a federal grand jury of defrauding the company of more than US$1.6 million.

=== Perdue buys Niman Ranch ===
In September 2015, Perdue Farms, a large privately owned poultry company, announced that it was buying Natural Food Holdings, the owner of Niman Ranch.

=== Niman Ranch becomes Certified Humane ===
Beginning September 1, 2016 (10 years ago), all of Niman Ranch’s pork, beef, lamb, and processed products, including bacon, sausages, hot dogs, and hams, became Certified Humane by the Humane Farm Animal Care program, making them the largest multi-protein company in the U.S. to join the program.

== Animal welfare ==
Niman Ranch farmers are prohibited from using gestation crates to confine pigs.

In 2022, Niman Ranch filed an amicus curiae brief with the U.S. Supreme Court in support of California's Proposition 12, which bars the sale of products from animals raised in gestation crates, battery cages, and veal crates.

In 2024 and 2025, Perdue Farms and Niman Ranch led coalitions of pork producers and meat companies opposed to federal efforts to overturn state animal welfare laws including Proposition 12 and Massachusetts Question 3.

== See also ==
- Poultry farming

== Bibliography ==
- Duxbury, Sarah (2006-08-18), "Niman Ranch beefs up for expansion", San Francisco Business Journal
- Finz, Stacy (2009-02-22), "Niman Ranch founder challenges new owners", San Francisco Chronicle
- "Niman Ranch, Inc". Encyclopedia of Company Histories.
- Niman, Bill; Fletcher, Janice (September 2005), The Niman Ranch Cookbook: From Farm to Table with America's Finest Meats (1st ed.), Berkeley, California: Ten Speed Press, ISBN 978-1-58008-520-5
