= Arrigo Cervetto =

- Born: 16 April 1927; Buenos Aires, Argentina
- Died: 23 February 1995 (aged 67); Savona, Italy
- Occupations: Political theorist, revolutionary

Arrigo Cervetto (16 April 1927 – 23 February 1995) was an Italian Marxist theorist, anti-fascist partisan, and founder of the political group Lotta Comunista. Initially active in the anarchist movement, he later embraced a neo-Leninist approach rooted in a distinctive analysis of imperialism and state capitalism.

== Biography ==
Born in Buenos Aires to working-class Italian parents, Cervetto returned to Savona during his childhood. During the 1943 strikes in northern Italy, he embraced anti-fascism and joined the Savona "Sguerso" Brigade in 1944, part of the Fumagalli Division, under the name "Stalin". He was wounded in combat and received a War Merit Cross.

He joined the Italian Communist Party but left in 1946 in protest against its postwar policies. Cervetto turned to anarchism and co-founded the group "Neither God Nor Master". He collaborated with prominent anarchists like Pier Carlo Masini and Umberto Marzocchi, and contributed to publications like Volontà and Umanità Nova.

In 1949, he wrote to Masini: "I didn’t believe Marxism, and especially Leninism, could be such a powerful weapon. Day by day I find in it nourishment for my ideas".

== The GAAP and Marxist Transition ==
In 1950, Cervetto helped establish the Anarchist Groups of Proletarian Action (GAAP), pushing for a class-based interpretation of anarchism aligned with Marxist principles. He favored the concept of "liquidating the state" over its spontaneous extinction and drew from Antonio Gramsci’s historic bloc theory.

After a temporary relocation to Argentina, he returned to Italy and further developed his theory of "unitary imperialism", opposing the dual-camp logic of Cold War geopolitics. He rejected both Soviet and American imperialism as expressions of the same global capitalist system.

== Toward Lotta Comunista ==
In 1956, he co-founded Azione Comunista with Masini and Giuseppe Seniga. Following ideological divisions, Cervetto moved toward a neo-Leninist perspective and advocated the construction of a revolutionary organization of cadres.

In 1965, he founded Lotta Comunista in Genoa and led it until his death in 1995, dedicating himself full-time to political theory and practice.

== Thought ==
Cervetto's theory centered on imperialism as a unified global system. He rejected the Soviet Union's socialist claims, labeling it a capitalist state integrated into world imperialism. He argued that imperialism did not block capitalism's spread but accelerated it in peripheral regions.

His approach anticipated some later theories by Paul Baran and Paul Sweezy, though he was more critical of their interpretation of the Soviet economy.

== Major works ==
- Lotte di classe e partito rivoluzionario (1966)
- L’imperialismo unitario (1988)
- Il ciclo politico del capitalismo di Stato (1989)
- Il mondo multipolare (1996)
- Opere complete, 27 vols. (2015–2019)

== Archives ==
- Cervetto Archive, Savona
- Franco Serantini Library Archive, GAAP Papers and Masini Correspondence
- Central State Archive (Rome), Ministry of the Interior, 1954
- ILSREC, Ligurian Partisan Database

== See also ==
- Lotta Comunista
- Imperialism
- Anarchist Groups of Proletarian Action
- Pier Carlo Masini
- Italian Communist Party
