= Lotta Comunista =

Lotta Comunista Lotta Comunista
- Leader: Guido La Barbera and Renato Pastorino
- Founded: December 1965
- Headquarters: Genoa
- Newspaper: Lotta Comunista (Italian); Internationalism (English); L'Internationaliste (French); Новый Прометей (New Prometheus) (Russian); Bulletin des Internationalismus (German); El Internacionalismo (Spanish); Intervenção Comunista (Portuguese)
- Student wing: Comitati Leninisti Studenteschi
- Ideology: Communism; Left communism Marxism; Leninism; Anti-Stalinism
- Political position: Far-left
- International affiliation: Lotta Comunista
- Slogan: Proletari di tutti i paesi unitevi!

Website
- edizionilottacomunista.com

Lotta Comunista (Communist Struggle) is an Italian Left communist political organization founded in 1965 by Arrigo Cervetto and Lorenzo Parodi. The group describes itself as an extra-parliamentary organization and does not consider participation in parliamentary politics to be its main strategy. Instead, it focuses on political education, long-term organization of the working class, and international communist cooperation.

The organization’s ideas are influenced by the writings of Karl Marx, Friedrich Engels, and Vladimir Lenin. Lotta Comunista is mainly known for its publishing activity, especially the newspaper of the same name, as well as study groups and political initiatives directed toward workers and students

== History ==
The origins of this organization go back to the 1950s, when some former partisans of GAAP (Anarchist Groups of Proletarian Action) who supported the FCL (Libertarian Communist Federation) and who were subsequently expelled from FAI (Italian Anarchist Federation) because they became Leninists, later joined the group called Azione Comunista. It had been expelled from the Italian Communist Party (PCI) as a result of the position it had taken in favor of the 1956 Hungarian insurgents, who were harshly repressed by the Soviets. Stalinism was defined as the reactionary policy of the counterrevolution after the death of Lenin. The group also protested against the positions of the Italian Communist Party, considered dependent on the Communist Party of the Soviet Union (CPSU) and dominated by the foreign policy of the USSR. It was also considered in collaboration with Italian capitalism. This situation would have strengthened the geopolitical structure that was emerging and so would have prevented the emergence and development of Marxist and internationalist forces.

Between 2012 and 2017, Lotta Comunista made its history public through three volumes published by its own publishing house: "Lotta Comunista. The Origins 1943-1952" (Milan, Edizioni Lotta Comunista, 2012), "Lotta Comunista. Towards the Strategy-Party 1953-1965" (Milan, Edizioni Lotta Comunista, 2015) and "Lotta Comunista. The Bolshevik Model 1965-1995" (Milan, Edizioni Lotta Comunista, 2017). This official party history is summarised by Guido La Barbera in 12 sections, 6 international and 6 Italian.[6]The six international sections of Lotta Comunista

1. Internationalist battle over wars in developing countries

In some theses formulated in 1957, the party's founder, Arrigo Cervetto, had indicated the opening of a long period (cycle) of world capitalist development[7]. The post-war expansion saw the establishment of new national bourgeoisies in the old colonial areas (decolonisation). Lotta Comunista supports national revolutions that favour capitalist development (hence of the proletariat) and exacerbate imperialist contradictions, but after the 1967 Arab-Israeli war in the Middle East and the Vietnam war in Asia, it indicates that imperialism is now "unitary", the world is divided between a handful of great powers, and the "national question" has ceased to be progressive in character, as it is now "seized" by the dispute between the imperialist powers and the impetus of national revolutions has been exhausted. In these crises, against the Stalinist, Maoist and Third Worldist positions, the priority political criterion to follow according to Lotta Comunista is the unity of the international proletariat[8].

2. Debate over the Sino-Soviet conflict

On the occasion of the Sino-Soviet border conflict in 1969 on the Ussuri River, Lotta Comunista points to a condition of weakness of "Chinese state capitalism", which drives Beijing to seek allies against US and Soviet imperialism: this is how the "Maoist Theory of the United Front" is interpreted with "European and Japanese imperialism". Given the scarcity of capital invested by "Russian imperialism" in China, a convergence with the US is hypothesised, anticipating what will happen in 1971. Analysing the Chinese question, Lotta Comunista seeks to counter the influence of Maoist ideologies[9]. For Lotta Comunista, there was capitalism in both Russia and China: in fact, the two capitalist states clashed over the Ussuri.

3. Debate over the Yalta Conference

Lotta Comunista opposed the Stalinist thesis of socialism in one country, pointing to the USSR as "state capitalism" and China and Vietnam as "young capitalisms". The analysis conducted by Amadeo Bordiga in "Economic and Social Structure of Russia Today" is an important theoretical reference that Lotta Comunista, while not belonging to Bordigism, recognises. There is no continuity between Lenin and Stalin: the latter would represent the bourgeois counterrevolution and Great-Russian nationalism. On this basis, Lotta Comunista opposes the representation of a worldwide struggle between the capitalist West and the camp of "communism". LC also rejects the depiction of a uniquely bipolar world, pointing to other actors, re-emerging at the time, such as Japan or Germany: with the formula of the "real partition" of Yalta[10], the party points to a de facto agreement between US and USSR imperialisms to keep Germany divided and prevent a potential European rival from emerging.

4. Debate over the restructuring crisis

The crisis of the 1970s is referred to by Lotta Comunista not as a general crisis as it had been in the 1930s, but as a "restructuring crisis"[11]: extensive development in the new areas (Asia, Africa, Latin America) gave the USA, Europe and Japan the breathing space to restructure their industrial base by projecting themselves into the new areas. From this approach, Lotta Comunista objected to Amadeo Bordiga's thesis of the general crisis in 1975.

5. Internationalist battle over the new contention

By the "new contention" of the 1980s[12], Lotta Comunista means the struggle leading to the end of the relations fixed at Yalta: more than thirty years of development since the post-war period and the restructuring crisis of the 1970s had profoundly changed the economic power relations between the powers, initiating an accelerated phase of imperialist confrontation. The US and USSR would see their relative decline begin, while Germany and Japan would re-emerge and China and India would emerge.

6. Internationalist battle at the end of Yalta

For Lotta Comunista the fall of the Berlin Wall and the dissolution of the USSR are a "strategic caesura" with effects comparable to a world war: the Yalta partition ends and, with German reunification, what LC sees as the process of the formation of European imperialism accelerates. The party points to the start of a "new partition", with Eastern Europe annexed to the EU and Moscow pushed back to its pre-Peter the Great borders. A decisive effect of this caesura is, in Asia, the revival of Chinese capitalist development, which prepares the shift of the world centre of gravity from the Atlantic to the Pacific basin, as predicted by Marx[13].

The Asian irruption indicates the start of a "new strategic phase", whose main features are the imperialist rise of China and the raising of the "global contention" to the level of the clash between forces of "continental stature" (USA, China, EU...). This, according to this analysis, is the decisive push in the direction of European imperialist unity.

Six Italian sections of Lotta Comunista

1. Leninist tactics on the school crisis

The "Theses on Leninist tactics in the school crisis" appeared in Lotta Comunista in May-June 1968[14]. The wave of student unrest originated in Italy's post-war capitalist development. The Theses state that "The school organisation is the main form of organisation of the dictatorship of capitalism exercised by the state in the ideological field, even if it is obviously not the only one". Within this framework, however, it is possible to recruit a generation of young militants for the Leninist party[15].

2. Battle over the prospects of tradeunionism

The post-war economic boom created a vast proletariat, concentrated mainly in the factories of the "industrial triangle" of northern Italy. With the "hot autumn" of 1969, the possibility of a strong trade union movement emerged. Italian "big capital" (big, to distinguish it from the petty bourgeoisie) could find in a trade unionist trade union and in a vast "working class aristocracy" the interpreters and the mass base for a "reformist line" (big reforms necessary to modernise the State) that is also social-imperialist. As with the "school crisis", the "prospects of tradeunionism" also offered space for Leninist tactics to root communist nuclei in the big factories. However, the season of tradeunionism would come to an early end[16].

3. Battle of Genoa

In Genoa, "capital of State capitalism" and stronghold of the "Stalinist" PCI, Lotta Comunista tested the possibility of implanting a party on the Bolshevik model in Italy. From 1966 to 1975 the battle against the PCI combined the fronts of Leninist tactics in the school crisis and that of the prospects of trade unionism, respectively, at the Casa dello Studente and Engineering School among the students and at Ansaldo among the workers[17]. According to Lotta Comunista, the clash was also "physical".

4. Battle of Milan

Lotta Comunista took root in Milan in the late 1960s. Cervetto and Parodi's relationship with the Bordigist diaspora groups dates back to the 1950s. From there, in 1968, individual militants switched to Lotta Comunista, forming the first embryo of the party in Milan. The development on the back of trade unionist struggles clashes with the violent campaign of the PCI and intellectual "groups". Lotta Comunista manages to preserve its Milanese organisational nucleus in a battle of "orderly retreat". The "groups" will dissolve with the "reflux" of the struggles and the PCI will be overwhelmed by the collapse of the USSR[18].

5. Battle of Turin

In Turin, the decisive battle for the establishment of Lotta Comunista came with the crisis at FIAT in 1980, linked to the restructuring crisis of 1974-75 and the European market. The affair of the "35 days" at FIAT, the request for mass redundancies and then for the redundancy fund, the inability of the PCI - imprisoned in the maximalist chase with the trade union - to assess the real power relations, and finally the defeat marked by the "march of the forty thousand", forced the LC committee in Turin to make an effort of understanding that went beyond the trade union dimension alone, the offering ground for political and organisational growth[19].

6. Political battle over social change

1980s: the "multi-income family" - in which several incomes and assets are added up - becomes the most generalised form of "working-class aristocracy". Lotta Comunista combats the new ideological forms of mass individualism, addresses the new class strata of white-collar workers and "technical producers", and the "deep strata" of immigrant workers, seeking internationalist political unity "from engineer to immigrant"[20].

The concept of a "new strategic phase" since the 2000s (imperialist rise of China) is then linked to the identification of a "new political cycle" of "Atlantic decline" in Europe and America where, amplified by an advanced "demographic winter" in the old powers the ideologies of proprietary individualism (with its associated reactionary, securitarian and xenophobic connotations) "enter into oscillation", giving rise to "electoral revolts" that favour both working-class abstentionism and the "proprietary, petty-bourgeois vote" for right-wing and sovereignist populist parties.

On 23 January 2016, a conference was held at the Teatro degli Arcimboldi in Milan to mark the first fifty years of the newspaper Lotta Comunista

== Political practice ==
In 1965, after a phase of theoretical clarification within the group, it assumed the name of Lotta Comunista and continued the line of abstention strategy against the participation of the party in elections and to what is defined as "bourgeois parliamentary democracy."

Unlike other extra-parliamentary groups, Lotta Comunista has never implemented or supported forms of armed struggle, even during the 1960s and 1970s. The party thinks that a revolution cannot take place if an ideology is not well-established locally, nationally, and internationally; otherwise, the revolution will degenerate into state capitalism like Stalinism or a social democracy. So it is devoted only to peaceful propaganda of Marxist ideas, waiting for an event of global reach, like a world war, to start a revolution.

The party's goal is to take root at the organizational level in neighborhoods, factories, and universities of some European countries to ensure that a significant proportion of the European working class, shortly, can be found in the Leninist party. It will be a reference and a guide on facing the gigantic upheavals that capitalism is leading worldwide. According to Lotta Comunista's thesis (taken directly from Marx), capitalism cannot maintain world order. According to these claims, the capitalist production system throws world society into a situation of chaos on a cyclical basis. It creates armed conflict to redefine the market. In turn, the general crisis of capitalism gives communists the opportunity to exploit the wars generated by capitalism to promote the proletarian revolution. On this aspect, the thesis of Lotta Comunista refers to the teachings of Lenin outlined in his April Theses.

== International initiatives ==
Lotta Comunista has a track record of organizing and facilitating international events that bring together various leftist organizations from around the world. These events serve as platforms for dialogue, exchange of ideas, and collaboration on issues of common interest, such as anti-imperialism, class struggle, and socialist internationalism. By hosting conferences, seminars, and other gatherings, Lotta Comunista helps foster solidarity among international leftist movements, promotes critical analysis of global political developments, and facilitates the sharing of experiences and strategies for revolutionary change. Their efforts contribute to building stronger connections and networks within the global communist and socialist movements.

== State capitalism in East Europe, Asia, and other places ==
One of the fundamental points of Lotta Comunista's policy is the so-called "correct and consistent application of Marxism."

Lotta Comunista has always rejected the idea that the Soviet Union, in its satellite countries and Asia, had achieved a form of communism or socialism. Instead, after Lenin's death, they think that the Soviet Union had taken shape as a true aristocracy of bureaucrats constituting a form of capitalism directed and controlled by the ruling political class or state capitalism.

Stalin also betrayed the revolution not only by highlighting his power but also by theorizing the possibility of the development of a communist system in a single country in a world dominated by capitalist powers (the theory of socialism in one country), contrary to what was said by Lenin and Marxists in general. Historiography indicates Lenin as the source of this internationalist concept. Indeed, the definition coined by Stalin to the Congress of the CPSU in 1923 happened when Lenin was significantly weakened by disease and unable to communicate. In this case, the version of paternity Stalinist historiography remains the most reliable. The featured characteristic of state capitalism created by Stalin, over the savagery in the repression and espionage (particularly against the Bolsheviks' critics of Stalinist policy), was the autarchic closure that he justified by theorizing an imaginary division of the world market into two blocks. Guido La Barbera, one of the current leaders of Lotta Comunista, said that Stalinism overcame an inherent weakness and chronic capital investing in war and heavy industry and not in developing economic and social infrastructure.

== Commemoration of the October Revolution and 1 May ==
On 7 November of each year, Lotta Comunista celebrates the anniversary of the October Revolution. On May 1, defined by Lotta Comunista not as "Labor Day" but as a day of the international struggle of workers, Lotta Comunista celebrates the "Internationalist First of May" (Primo Maggio Internazionalista) with demonstrations (in Genoa, Milan, Turin, and Brescia among other cities) and initiatives in the cities where it is present as an organized political party.

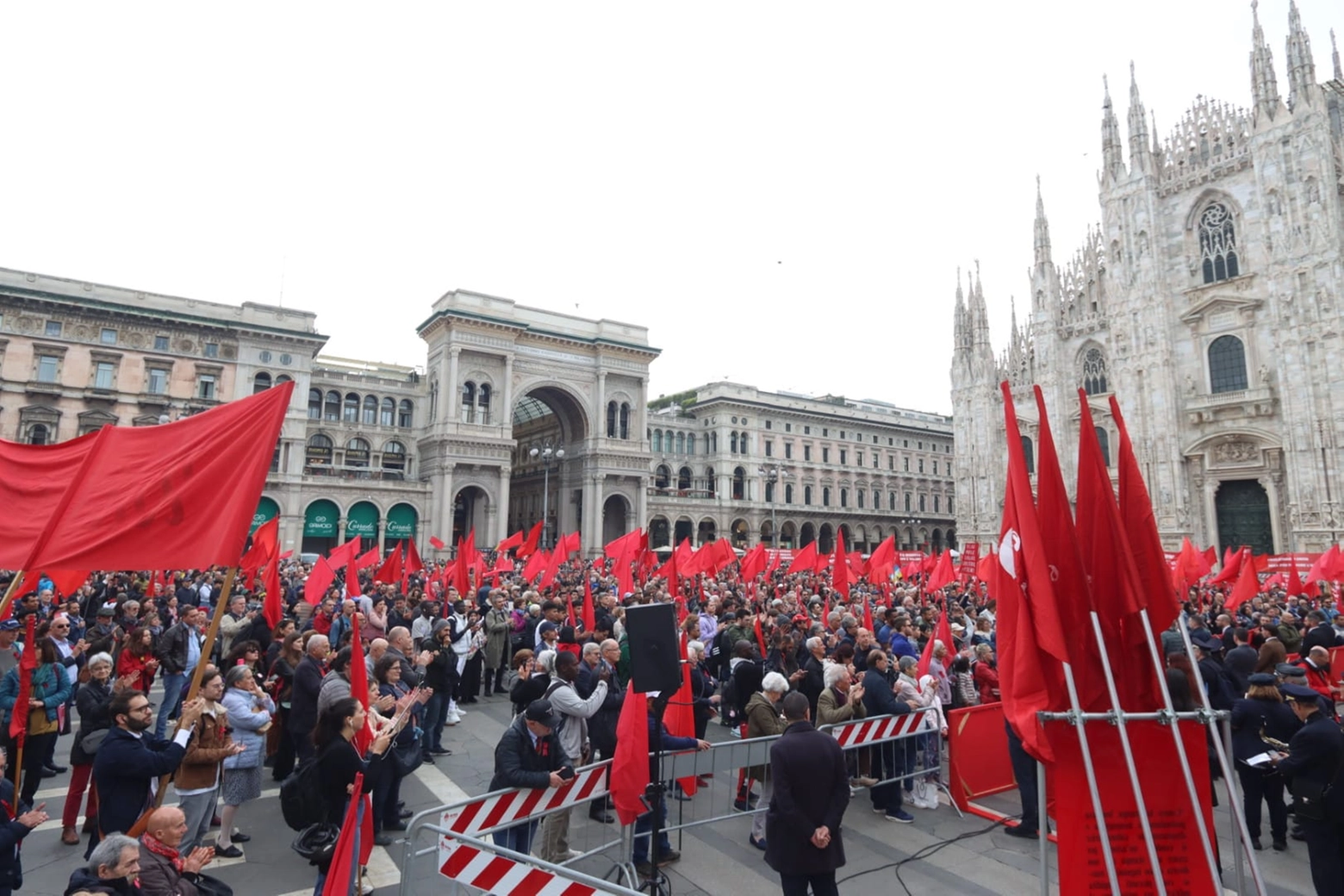
The First of May 2024 demonstration, organized by Lotta Comunista (Communist Struggle) in Milan, Italy, carried an internationalist character.

== Localization ==
The Head office of Lotta Comunista are historically located in Genoa. Still, the party operates in industrial cities (the clubs of Milan, Turin, and Rome are very active). It also opened several clubs abroad, particularly in France, Russia, Spain, Germany, Britain, Greece, and Brazil. The purpose of Lotta Comunista is to entrench a Leninist party in some locales of key European cities, such as the Italian industrial triangle and the Ile de France in Paris. Lotta Comunista publishes and disseminates the namesake monthly, founded in 1965, which is entirely self-financed. Lotta Comunista Editions collects, publishes, and reproduces material produced since 1950 in the Italian, French, English, Spanish, Portuguese, German, Russian, and Greek languages.

The organization is among the strongest extra-parliamentary formations in Italy, with about 40,000 copies of its Lotta Comunista publication sold house by house by its activists each month. Currently it is active in cities such as: Genoa, Milan, Pavia, Turin, London, Paris, Nice, Rome, Parma, Savona, Brescia, Bergamo, Padua, Verona, Bologna, Florence, Pisa, Naples, Udine, St. Petersburg, Athens, Rio de Janeiro, Bari, Brindisi, Lecce, Valencia, and Berlin.

== Editions Marxist Science ==
Lotta Comunista has another publisher based in Paris, Science Marxiste, which publishes books in European languages: French, Greek, English, Russian, Portuguese, German, and Spanish.

== Editions Pantarei ==
Lotta Comunista publishes Italian texts that address the deepening and the history of the labor movement as well as classics of Marxism such as Karl Marx, Friedrich Engels, Leon Trotsky, Lenin and Amadeo Bordiga. Editions Pantarei also republishes essential texts such as the History of the Italian Communist Party by Giorgio Galli.

== Institute of Studies on Capitalism ==
In Genoa, Lotta Comunista established the Institute for the Study of Capitalism, with an extensive library including documents represented in several publications of the "Edizioni Panta Rei."

== Sergio Motosi Institute ==
In 2005, Lotta Comunista founded the Sergio Motosi Institute for the Study of International Workers' Movement in honor of the militant Sergio Motosi, who died in 2002. The institute aims to deepen the study of the history of the labor movement around the world.

== Center for International Studies "Noviy Prometey" ==
Lotta Comunista has created an NGO in Russia: the Centre for International Studies "Noviy Prometey" (New Prometheus), which deals with the publication and dissemination of the "Bulletin Internationalist", the newspaper "Proletarian Internationalism" and books by the group translated into Russian. It also offers courses on Marxism, as it does in Italy and France. The organization ceased operations in 2021 and closed the legal entity in 2022.

== See also ==
- Amadeo Bordiga
- Arrigo Cervetto
- Left communism
- Leninism
- Marxism
