= Eridan =

Eridan may refer to:

== Transportation and vehicular ==
- Éridan (rocket), a French rocket
- MV Éridan (1928) a French cargo liner in service 1928-56
- Éridan-class minehunter, a class of French naval minehunters
  - FS Éridan (M 641), a French navy Éridan-class minehunter

== Other uses ==
- Eridan Ampora, a character from the webcomic Homestuck (2009-2016)
- Eridanosaurus, a rhinocerotid originally described as a crocodilian

== See also ==
- Eris (disambiguation)
- Eridanus (disambiguation), including "Eridani"
- Eridani
- Eridian (disambiguation)
- Eridania (disambiguation)
