= Erid =

Erid may refer to:

- Eris (dwarf planet), the former 10th planet of the Solar System, known with the root term "Erid"
- Erid, an abbreviation for "Eridanus" (a constellation) and "Eridani" (in the constellation Eridanus); see IAU designated constellations
  - Constellation Eridanus (abbrev: Erid, Eri), an IAU constellation, one of 88 official constellations used in modern astronomy
- 40 Eridani A b, a proposed exoplanet candidate fictionalized as the planet "Erid", a planet from Project Hail Mary film and novel, a fictional planet located in the real star system '40 Eridani'

== See also ==
- En Route Information Display System (ERIDS), part of En Route Automation Modernization, En Route Automation Modernization
- Eridanus (disambiguation)
- Eridan (disambiguation)
- Eridian (disambiguation)
- Eridania (disambiguation)
