= Aristophanes (disambiguation) =

Aristophanes (c. 456 – c. 386 BC) was an Ancient Greek comic dramatist known for his plays The Frogs, The Birds, The Clouds, and Lysistrata.

Aristophanes may also refer to:

- 2934 Aristophanes, a small main belt asteroid named after the above
- Aristophanes (vase painter) (fl. 5th century BC), ancient Greek vase painter of the Attic red-figure style
- Aristophanes of Mallus, a writer from Cilicia who wrote works on agriculture in or before the 1st century BCE. He is mentioned in passing in De Re Rustica by Marcus Terentius Varro, but his works are lost and nothing further is known of him.
- Aristophanes of Boeotia, a writer mentioned in Plutarch's On the Malice of Herodotus. He is also described in the Suda as having written a book about Thebes (Θηβαϊκά), which the Suda liberally quotes. His works are lost and nothing further is known of him.
- Aristophanes of Byzantium (c. 257 – c. 185 BC), Greek scholar, critic and grammarian
- Aristophanes of Corinth, who was addressed as a friend in some letters and orations of the 4th century rhetorician Libanius.

== See also ==
- Aristophane (1967–2004), Guadalopean comics artist
- Aris (disambiguation)
