= Aries =

Aries may refer to:

- Aries (astrology), an astrological sign
- Aries (constellation), a constellation in the zodiac

== Arts, entertainment and media ==
- Aries (album), by Luis Miguel, 1993
- Aries (EP), by Alice Chater, 2020
- "Aries" (song), by Gorillaz, 2020
- Aries (character), fictional characters in Marvel Comics
- Aries (journal), a journal of the European Society for the Study of Western Esotericism

== People ==
- Aries (musician) (born 1998), American musician
- Austin Aries (Daniel Healy Solwold Jr, born 1978), American professional wrestler
- Lolee Aries (1957-2018), American television producer
- Philippe Ariès (1914–1984), French historian
- Joseph Hyacinthe Louis Jules d'Ariès (1813–1878), French naval officer

== Science and technology ==
- Aries (rocket)
- Algorithms for Recovery and Isolation Exploiting Semantics, a recovery algorithm in computer science
- Apache Aries, a set of software components
- Aries, an interconnect in the Cray XC30 architecture

== Transportation ==
- Dodge Aries, an automobile
- Ariès, a French automobile 1902–1937
- EP-3E Aries, a reconnaissance aircraft
- Miles Aries, a development of the Miles Gemini aircraft
- GNV Aries, a North Sea ferry
- USS Aries, the name of several ships
- MSC Aries, a 2020 container vessel seized by Iran in 2024
- HSC Aries, a former monohull fast ferry owned by Tirrenia

== Other uses ==
- Arieș, a river in Romania
- Aries (mountain), in Olympic National Park, Washington, U.S.
- Aryabhatta Research Institute of Observational Sciences, in India
- Aries Telecoms, a Malaysian computer supplier

== See also ==
- Arieș (disambiguation)
- Aeris (disambiguation)
- AIRES, Colombian airline
- Ares (disambiguation)
- Aris (disambiguation)
- Arius (disambiguation)
- Aries in Chinese astronomy
- Eros, Greek god of lust
- Ovis aries, sheep
