= Chin-Chou =

Chin-Chou, Chinchou or Chinchow may refer to:

== Cities in China ==
- Jinzhou, Liaoning
  - Jinzhou, Jinzhou
- Jinzhou, Dalian
- Jinzhou, Hebei
- Jinzhou, Ningxiang
- Quanzhou, Fujian

== Provinces in China ==
- Jinzhou Province

== Other uses ==
- Chinchou (Pokémon), a Pokémon species
- Qiu Jin (1875–1907), Chinese revolutionary, feminist, and writer
