= Aison (vase painter) =

Ancient attic-greek red-figure vase painter

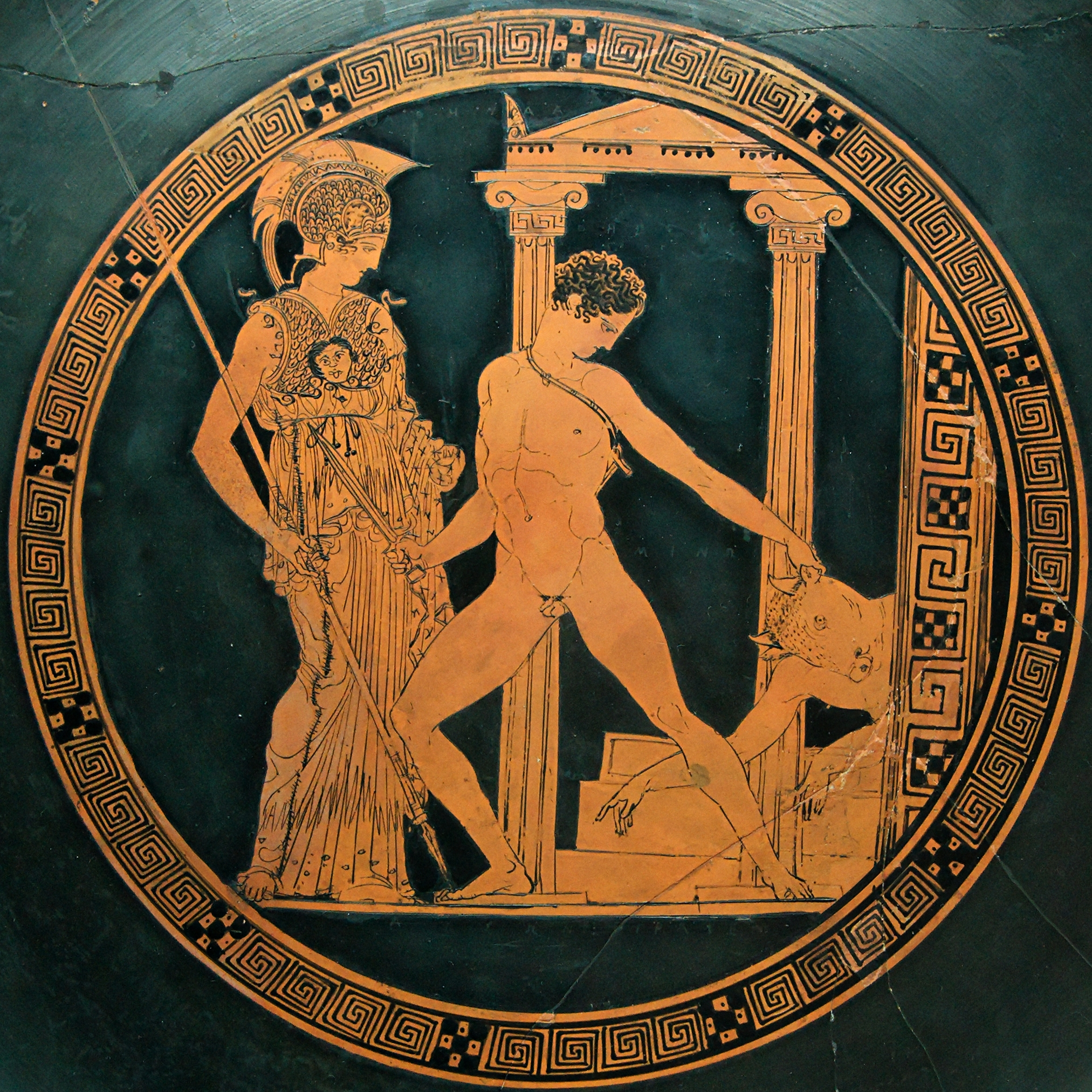
Theseus killing the Minotaur, tondo from an Attic red-figure kylix by Aison

Aison or Aeson (/ˈiːsɒn/, Greek Αἴσων) was an ancient Greek vase painter of the red-figure style. About 60 of his vases survive, which are dated between 435 and 415 BCE. Aison spent his career in several workshops, where he came into contact with several other well-known painters. His first works were created in the same workshop as the Kodros Painter. A kylix with motifs from the Theseus legend, that is today in the National Archaeological Museum of Spain, was created in the same workshop that Penthesilea Painter was active in and Aristophanes was later to join. In his third workshop he worked together with the Schuvalow Painter and the Eretria Painter. Here he painted mostly closed containers. All three artists stood in the tradition of Polygnotos. From this time his second showpiece originates, the lekythos in Naples National Archaeological Museum. Two further lekythoi (from the Louvre and the National Archaeological Museum of Athens) clearly mark a turning point in the artist's life when he embraced the Adonis cult. The difference is seen in the quality of his work, which is probably due primarily to difficult life circumstances, as demonstrated by the frequent workshop changes.
