= Eridania =

Eridania may refer to:

== Places ==
- Eridania Lake, a proposed defunct ancient lake on Mars
- Eridania Mons, a mountain on Mars; see List of mountains on Mars
- Eridania Planitia, a plain in the Southern Highlands on Mars
- Eridania quadrangle (MC-29), a region of Mars
- Eridania Scopulus, an escarpment on Mars; see Classical albedo features on Mars

== Other uses ==
- Eridania Segura, Dominican weightlifter who participated in the 1992 World Weightlifting Championships
- SS Eridania, a WWII munitions transport ship sunk by ORP Sokół (1940)

== See also ==
- Spodoptera eridania (S. eridania), the Southern armyworm, a moth
- Eridanus (disambiguation)
- Eridan (disambiguation)
- Eridian (disambiguation)
- Eridani
- ERI (disambiguation)
- Eris (disambiguation)
