= Aris =

Aris or ARIS may refer to:

== People ==
- Aris (surname)

=== Given name ===
- Aris Alexandrou, Greek writer
- Aris Brimanis, ice hockey player
- Aris Christofellis, Greek male soprano
- Aris Damianidis (born 1955), Greek footballer
- Aris Gavelas, Greek sprinter
- Aris Konstantinidis, Greek architect
- Aris Maliagros, Greek actor
- Aris Poulianos (1924–2021), Greek anthropologist and archaeologist
- Aris Spiliotopoulos (born 1966), Greek politician
- Aris Tatarounis (born 1989), Greek basketball player
- Aris Velouchiotis (1905–1945), Greek guerrilla fighter in the 1940s
- Aris Xevghenis (born 1981), Greek footballer

== Fictional characters ==
- Aris Kristatos, in the James Bond film For Your Eyes Only

== Places ==
- Arış, Azerbaijan
- Aris, Bern, a village in the municipality of Reichenbach im Kandertal in the Swiss canton of Bern
- Aris, Messenia, a municipality in Greece, next to a river by the same name
- Aris, Namibia, a settlement south of the capital Windhoek

== Sports clubs ==
- A Greek sports club in Thessaloniki, Aris Thessaloniki:
  - Aris B.C., a basketball club
  - Aris Thessaloniki F.C., a football club
  - Aris Volleyball Club, a volleyball club
  - Aris Water Polo Club, a water polo club
  - Aris Baseball Club, a baseball club
  - Aris Thessaloniki Ice Hockey Club, an ice hockey club
- Aris Limassol, a Cypriot football club in Limassol
- FC Aris Bonnevoie was a football club, based in Luxembourg City
- South Springvale SC, an Australian semi-professional soccer club, nicknamed Aris

== Other uses ==
- A common nickname for several common Greek given names, such as Aristotle, Aristides, Aristomenes, etc.
- Ares, god in Greek mythology; also a Greek given name
- Architecture of Integrated Information Systems (ARIS), a method for analyzing processes
- ARIS Express, a freeware software tool from IDS Scheer AG based on the Architecture of Integrated Information Systems concept
- Arris, an architectural term for a sharp edge
- Anti-Racism Information Service (ARIS THERMIS) in Geneva, Switzerland
- American Religious Identification Survey (ARIS)
- Advanced Research Instrumentation Ship, two radar ships (the H.H. Arnold and the H.S. Vandenberg) of the U.S. Air Force which replaced the USAS American Mariner
- Swiss Academic Spaceflight Initiative (German: Akademische Raumfahrt Initiative Schweiz), a research program at ETH Zurich, Switzerland
- Airis Computer, a defunct mail-order computer company
- VSmart Aris, a smartphone produced by VinSmart of Vingroup from Vietnam

== See also ==
- Arys (disambiguation)
- Aries (disambiguation)
