= 英利 =

英利, meaning "excel, clever", may refer to:

- Arfiya Eri (born 1988), Japanese politician
- Hidetoshi, Japanese given name
- Yingli, a solar panel manufacturer

== See also ==
- Eri (disambiguation)
- Yingli (disambiguation)
