= Yingli (disambiguation) =

Yingli is a Chinese a solar panel manufacturer.

Yingli may also refer to:

- Yingli, Jinzhou, Hebei (营里镇), a township-level division in China
- Yingli Township (营里乡), a township-level division of Pingshan County in Hebei, China
- Yingli Tower, a skyscraper in Chongqing, China

== See also ==
- 英利 (disambiguation)
