= Eriş =

Eriş is a Turkish name and may refer to:

== Given name ==
- Eriş Özkan, Turkish footballer

== Surname ==
- Ceyhun Eriş, Turkish footballer
- Murat Eriş, Turkish table tennis player

== See also ==
- Eris (disambiguation)
