= Xiaoqiao (disambiguation) =

Xiaoqiao may refer to:

- Two Qiaos, pair of sisters that lived during the late Han Dynasty, the younger of which is known as "Xiaoqiao" (小喬)
- Xiaoqiao, Hebei (小樵镇), town in Jinzhou
- Xiaoqiao, Jiangxi (孝桥镇), town in Linchuan District, Fuzhou on List of township-level divisions of Jiangxi
