= Heinz Kamnitzer =

German writer and historian

- Heinz Kamnitzer (1982)
- Born: 10 May 1917; Berlin, Germany
- Died: 21 May 2001 (aged 84); Berlin, Germany
- Occupations: Writer historian
- Political party: KPD; SED

Heinz Kamnitzer (10 May 1917, Berlin – 21 May 2001, Berlin) was a German writer and historian. He was part of the political-cultural establishment and a vocal government supporter in the German Democratic Republic (East Germany).

== Life ==
=== Early years ===
Kamnitzer was born into a Jewish family in Berlin at the height of the First World War. His father was a pharmacist. His younger brother Peter (1921–1998) was an architect and a professor of Architecture and Urban Planning at UCLA, who emigrated to Los Angeles. In 1931 he joined the Socialist school students' League, and in Autumn 1933, while still at school, Kamnitzer was arrested for undertaking illegal political work. In January of that year the NSDAP (Nazi party) had seized power, and the arrest should be seen in the context of their subsequent rapid imposition of one-party government on Germany. He was soon released and emigrated to England where he concluded his schooling at a London polytechnical college.

=== Exile ===
In 1935/36 he traveled to Palestine where he performed relief work and undertook a training in carpentry. Later in 1936 he returned to London where he was a "Guest student" at the London School of Economics and worked as a journalist, contributing to anti-Fascist publications. It was while he was in England that in 1938 he became a member of the German Communist Party. For six months, starting in October 1939, he was editor in chief of a newspaper produced in London called "Inside Nazi Germany", but the enterprise lost its original financial backing from the Communist Party a few months after the signing of the non-aggression pact between Germany and the Soviet Union and the paper folded in March 1940.

In 1940, like many Jewish and political exiles from Nazi Germany who had sought refuge in Britain, Kamnitzer was arrested and interned in Canada. By 1942, the shifting alliances of the war found Imperial Britain in alliance with Communist Russia: Kamnitzer was permitted to return to London where he became an editor with an economically focused newspaper called, at that time, Petroleum Press Services, a position he would retain till 1946. At the start of the war Kamnitzer's membership of the Communist Party had attracted a certain intensity of attention from the British police and in 1940 he had resigned his party membership, but in 1945, Britain being for a fourth year in alliance with Stalin's Russia, he felt able to rejoin the Party. During the closing years of the war he also began to study political science and became a leading member of the London-based Free German Culture Association (FDKB / Freier Deutscher Kulturbund in Großbritannien) and a member of the "Jewish relief Committee for the USSR".

=== Return to (East) Germany ===
==== Academic career ====
Heinz Kamnitzer returned from exile in 1946 and joined the new country's newly formed ruling SED (party). He also joined Berlin's Humboldt University to study Philosophy, and in 1950 received his doctorate for a dissertation produced under the supervision of Alfred Meusel (1896–1960) and entitled "Germany's Economic Structure at the Time of the 1848 Revolutions". He had already taken up a lectureship in History from the Humboldt since 1946, and in 1949/50 he became a professor at the Brandenburg Regional Academy (as it was then known) in Potsdam.

In 1950 Kamnitzer married the actress Irene Eisermann; they remained together till her death in 1997.

Between 1950 and 1954 he had a full lectureship as professor for "The History of the German People" at the Humboldt University. From 1952 he served as director of the Institute for the History of the German People, and from 1953 till 1955 he worked as one of three co-editors on the monthly Marxist–Leninist Zeitschrift für Geschichtswissenschaft (academic journal). For some time Heinz Kamnitzer lived in the so-called "Intellectuals' District" in the Schönholz quarter of Berlin where the regime had gathered together its favoured scholars.

His academic career came to an end following a plagiarism scandal. A review in the Historische Zeitschrift (Historical Journal) disclosed that in a publication about Thomas Müntzer which Kamnitzer had produced in collaboration with Alfred Meusel, most of the historical documents on the Peasants' War had been lifted, without attribution, from a 1926 work by the Agrarian Historian Günther Franz. Because the original documents used had clearly been "worked on" by Franz, who was still very much alive, it was considered that Kamnitzer had plagiarized the senior historian's work. He was relieved of his position as director of The Institute, surrendered his professorship, and embarked on a career as a freelance writer.

==== Writing career ====
He published numerous non-fiction books and works of poetry. His best known book is Der Tod des Dichters ("The Death of the Poet") which concerns the death of Arnold Zweig. He has also been an editor of Zweig's works.

Kamnitzer also undertook work for DEFA, the state-owned film studio. He wrote the scripts for various films including Mord an Rathenau (Murder of Rathenau) (1961) written in collaboration with Alexander Stenbock-Fermor, Junge Frau von 1914 (Maiden of 1914) (1969) co-written with Egon Günther and Education Before Verdun (1973), also with Egon Günther. In addition he did television work.

=== Political loyalties ===
Kamnitzer was a loyal citizen of the German Democratic Republic, but he also demonstrated loyalty to the state of Israel that reflected his own Jewish origins. He refused to sign a resolution that attributed sole responsibility to Israel for the 1967 War in the Middle East, taking a position that demonstrated public solidarity with, among others, the Dutch singer Lin Jaldati and the West German leader of the Jewish community, Helmut Aris.

=== Other activities ===
From 1970 till 1989 Kamnitzer was president of the writer's association PEN in the German Democratic Republic. He resigned the presidency in October 1989 during the run up to German reunification, and resigned his membership of the organisation in 1995.

Between 1978 and 1989 Heinz Kamnitzer was listed in the Stasi files as an Informal Collaborator under the alias "IM Georg".

== Awards and honours ==
- 1965 Carl von Ossietzky Medal of the GDR
- 1974 Patriotic Order of Merit in silver
- 1977 Patriotic Order of Merit in gold
- 1987 Star of People's Friendship in gold

== Selected publications ==
- Alfred Meusel: Thomas Müntzer und seine Zeit: Mit einer Auswahl der Dokumente des Grossen Deutschen Bauernkrieges. edited by Heinz Kamnitzer, Aufbau-Verlag, Berlin 1952
- Zur Vorgeschichte des Deutschen Bauernkrieges. Rütten & Loening, Berlin 1953
- Das Testament des letzten Bürgers. Essays und Polemiken. Berlin und Weimar, Aufbau. Berlin 1973
- Der Tod des Dichters. Buchverlag der Morgen, Berlin 1981
- Abgesang mit Schmerzen. Spotless, Berlin 1993
- Die grosse Verschwörung: Deutschland 1914–1918. GNN, Schkeuditz 1999
- Ein Mann sucht seinen Weg: Über Arnold Zweig. GNN, Schkeuditz 2001
