= Donglizhuang =

Donglizhuang 东里庄镇
- Town
- Location in Hebei
- Coordinates: 37°56′06″N 115°05′02″E
- Country: People's Republic of China
- Province: Hebei
- Prefecture-level city: Shijiazhuang
- County-level city: Jinzhou
- Village-level divisions: 27 villages
- Elevation: 46 m (151 ft)
- Time zone: UTC+8 (China Standard)
- Area code: 0311

Donglizhuang (simplified Chinese: 东里庄; traditional Chinese: 東里莊; pinyin: Dōnglǐzhuāng) is a town under the administration of Jinzhou City in south-central Hebei province, China, located 11 kilometres (6.8 mi) south-southeast of the municipal seat. As of 2011, it has 27 villages under its administration.

== See also ==
- List of township-level divisions of Hebei
