= Kantharos =

Type of Greek pottery

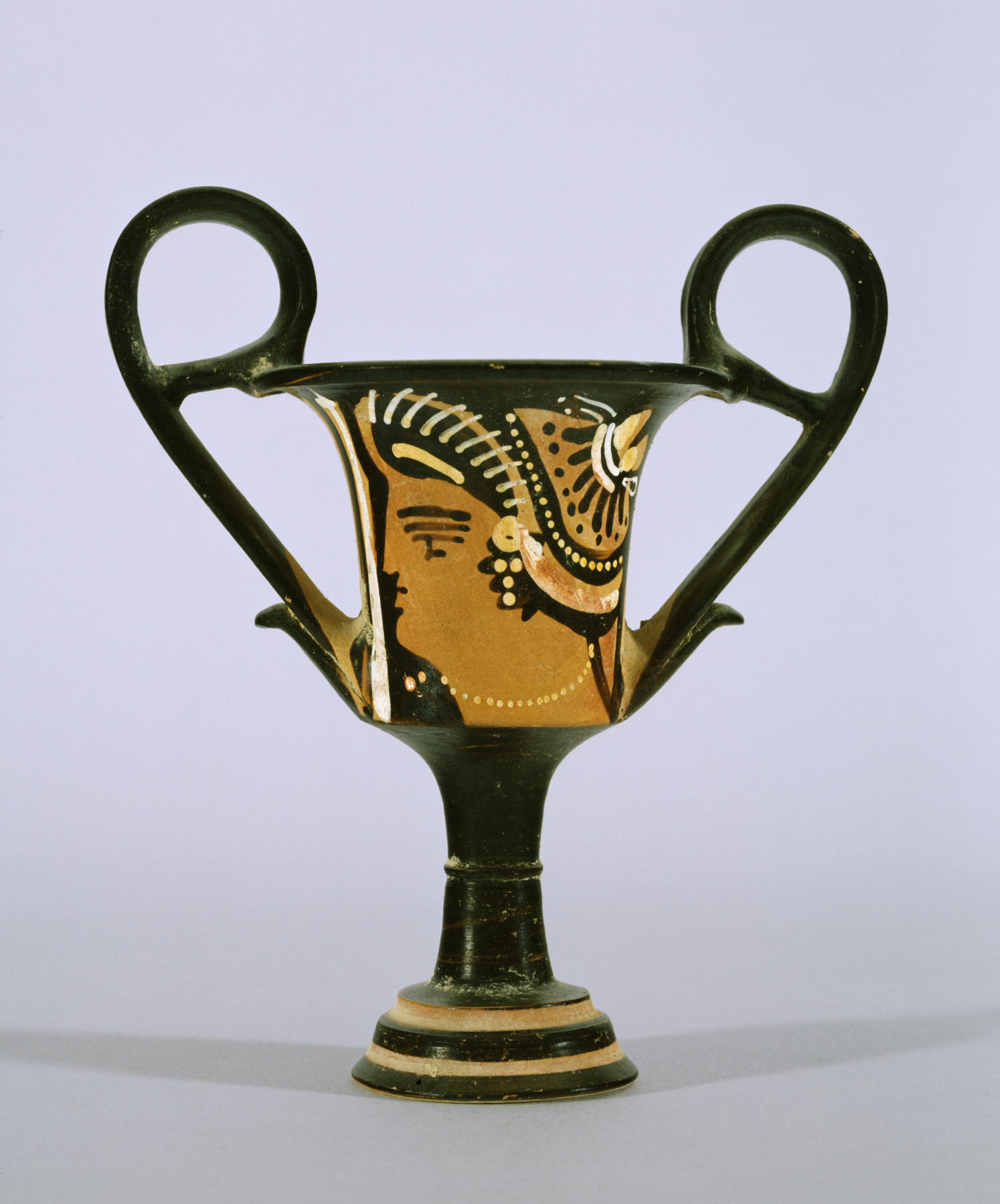
Red-figure Apulian kantharos with a female head, 320–310 BC (Walters Art Museum)

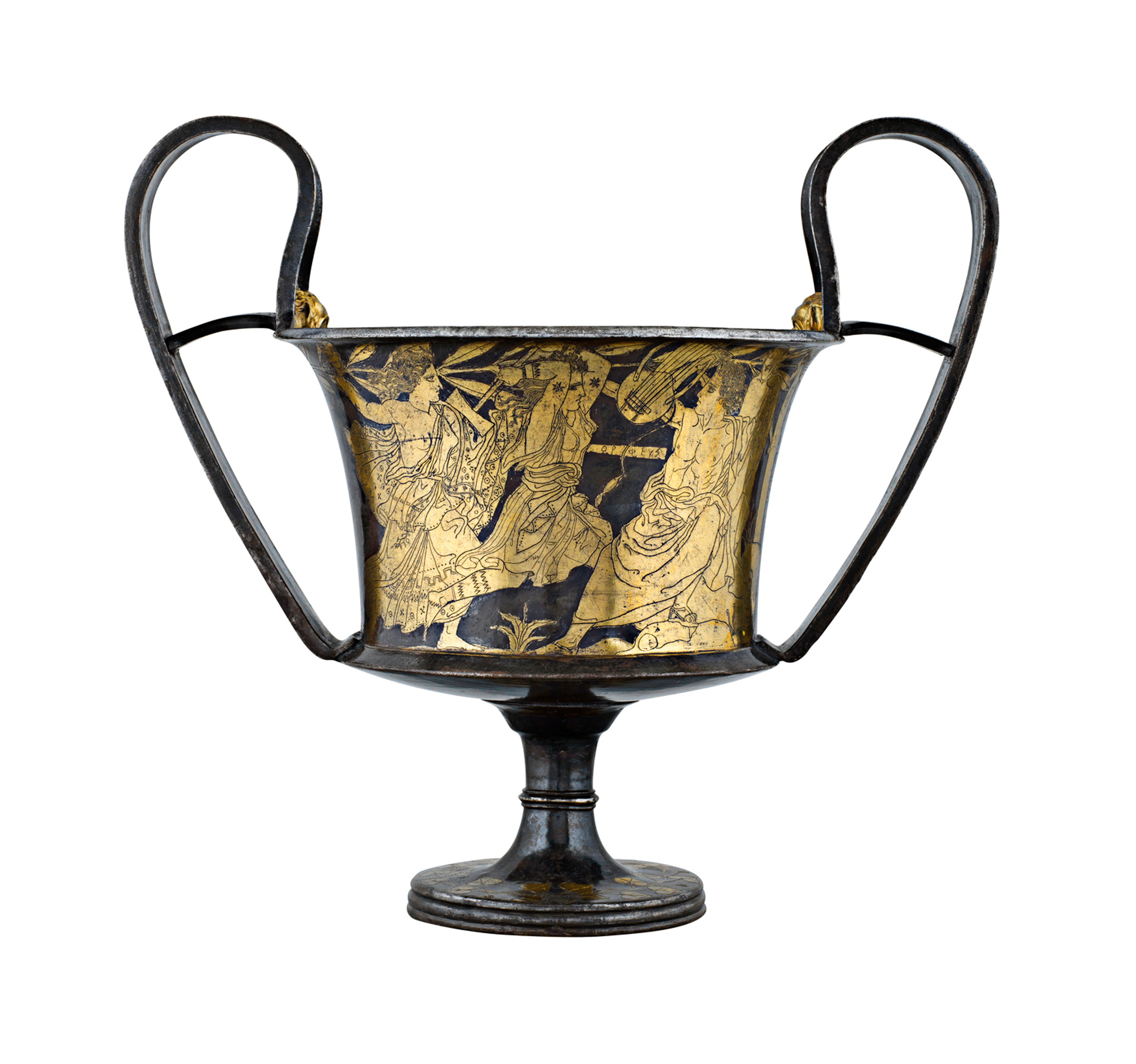
Silver kantharos with the death of Orpheus and the abduction of Helen, c. 420–410 BC, part of the Vassil Bojkov collection, Sofia, Bulgaria

A kantharos (/ˈkænθəˌrɒs/; Ancient Greek: κάνθαρος) or cantharus (/ˈkænθərəs/) is a type of ancient Greek cup used for drinking. Although almost all surviving examples are in Greek pottery, the shape, like many Greek vessel types, probably originates in metalwork. In its iconic "Type A" form, it is characterized by its deep bowl, tall pedestal foot, and pair of high-swung handles which extend above the lip of the pot. The Greek words kotylos (κότυλος, masculine) and kotyle (κοτύλη, feminine) are other ancient names for this same shape.

The kantharos is a cup used to hold wine, probably both for drinking and for ritual use in libations and offerings. The kantharos seems to be an attribute of Dionysus (/Dionýsios/ ; Ancient Greek: Διονύσιος), the god of wine, who was associated with vegetation, theatre and fertility.

As well as a banqueting cup, they could be used in pagan rituals as a symbol of rebirth or resurrection, the immortality offered by wine, "removing in moments of ecstasy the burden of self-consciousness and elevating man to the rank of deity".

== Gallery ==
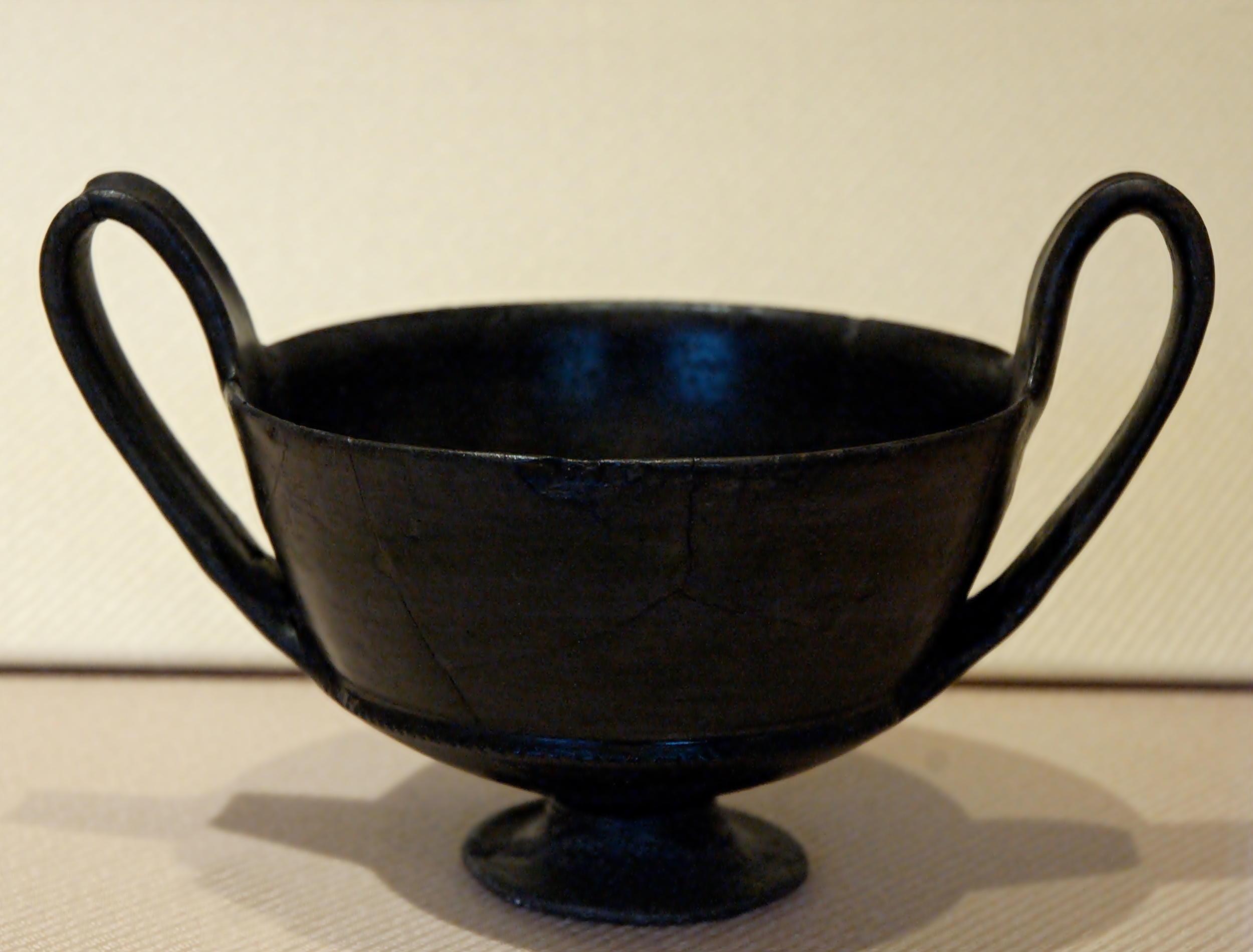
Bucchero kantharos (Latial culture, 830–730 BC)

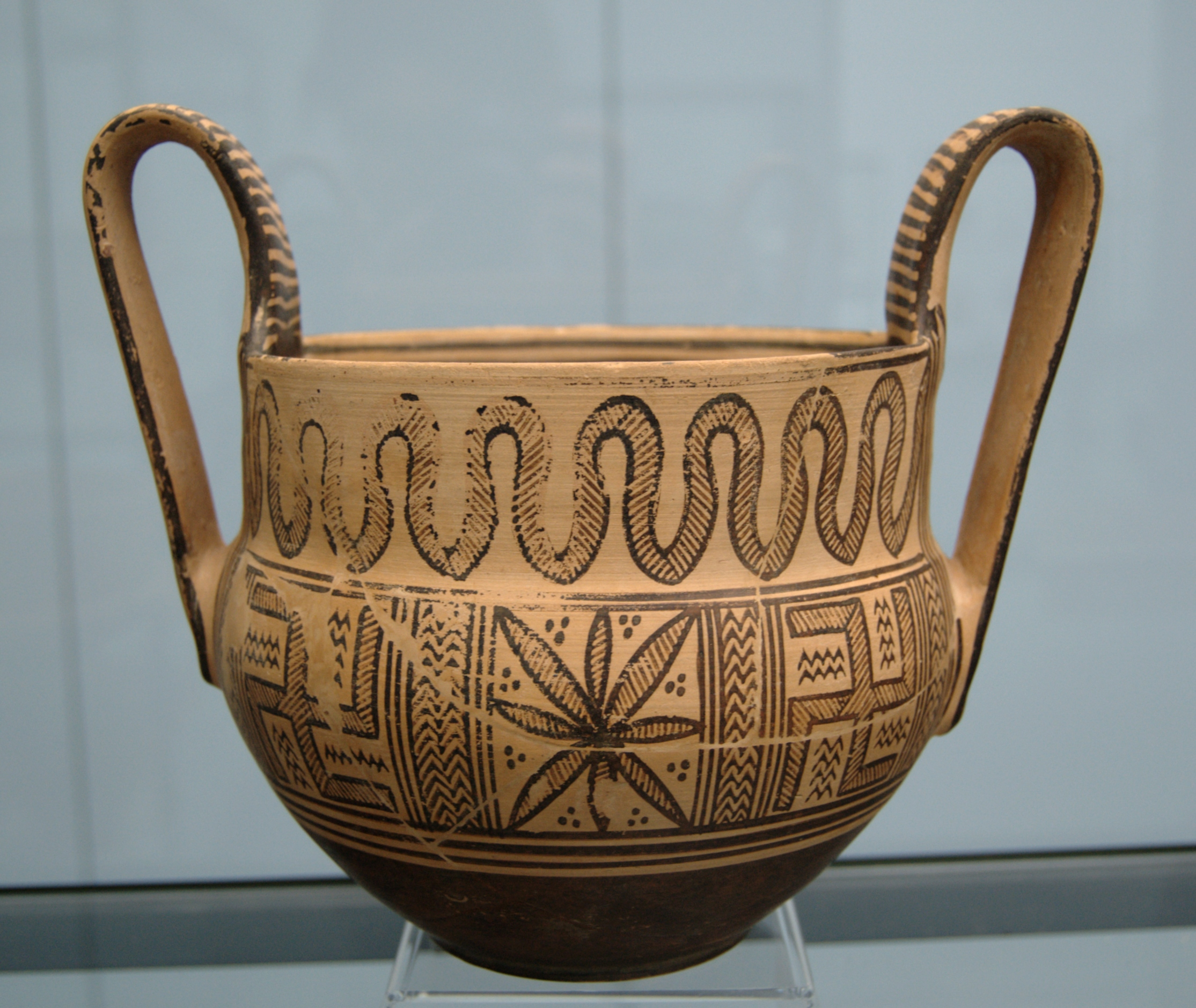
Geometric funerary kantharos (Attica, c. 780 BC)

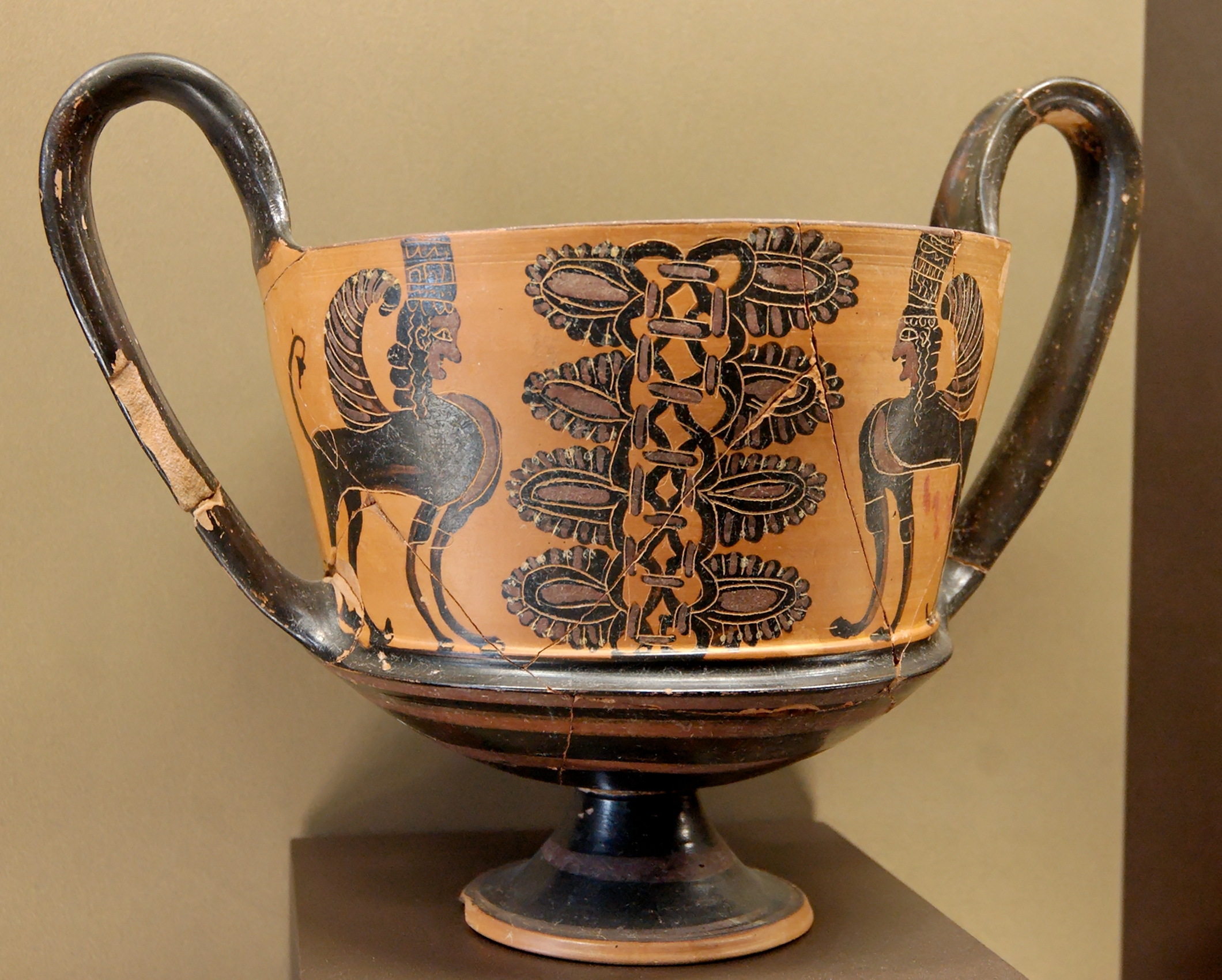
Black-figure kantharos with sphinxes (Boeotia, c. 550 BC)

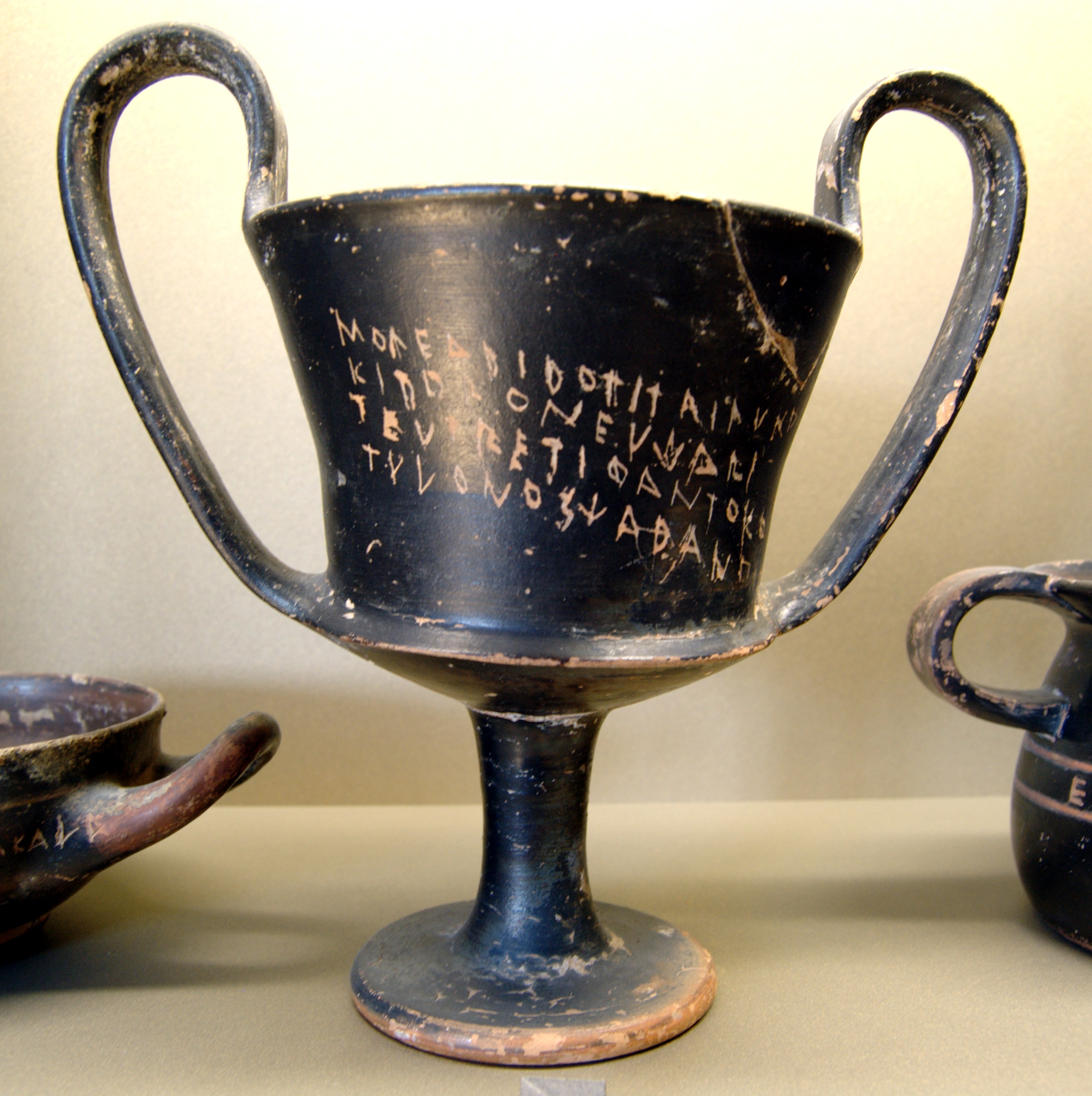
Black-glaze kantharos with Boeotian inscription (Thespiae, 450–425 BC)

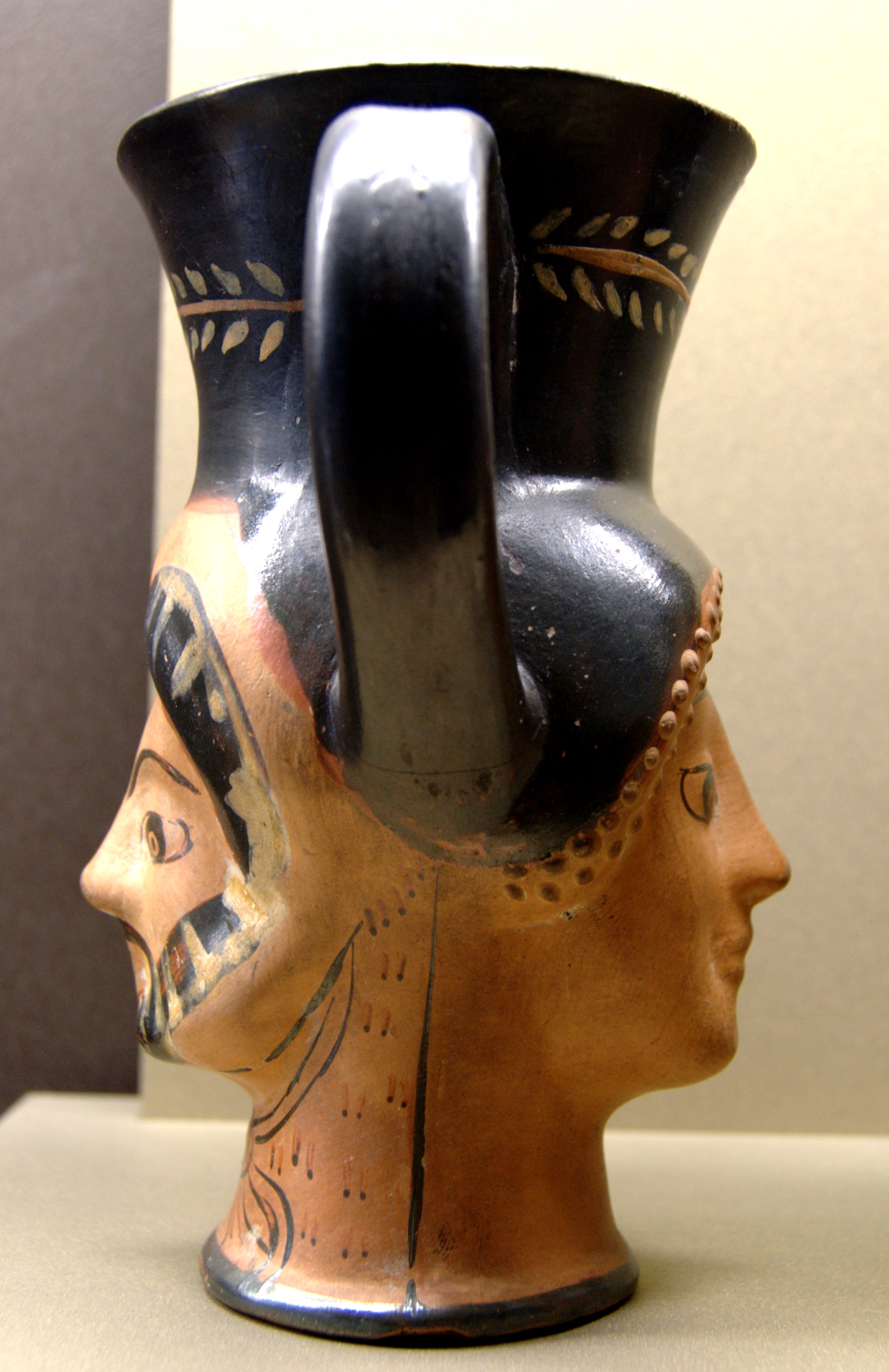
Side view of janiform kantharos with Heracles and woman (480–460 BC)

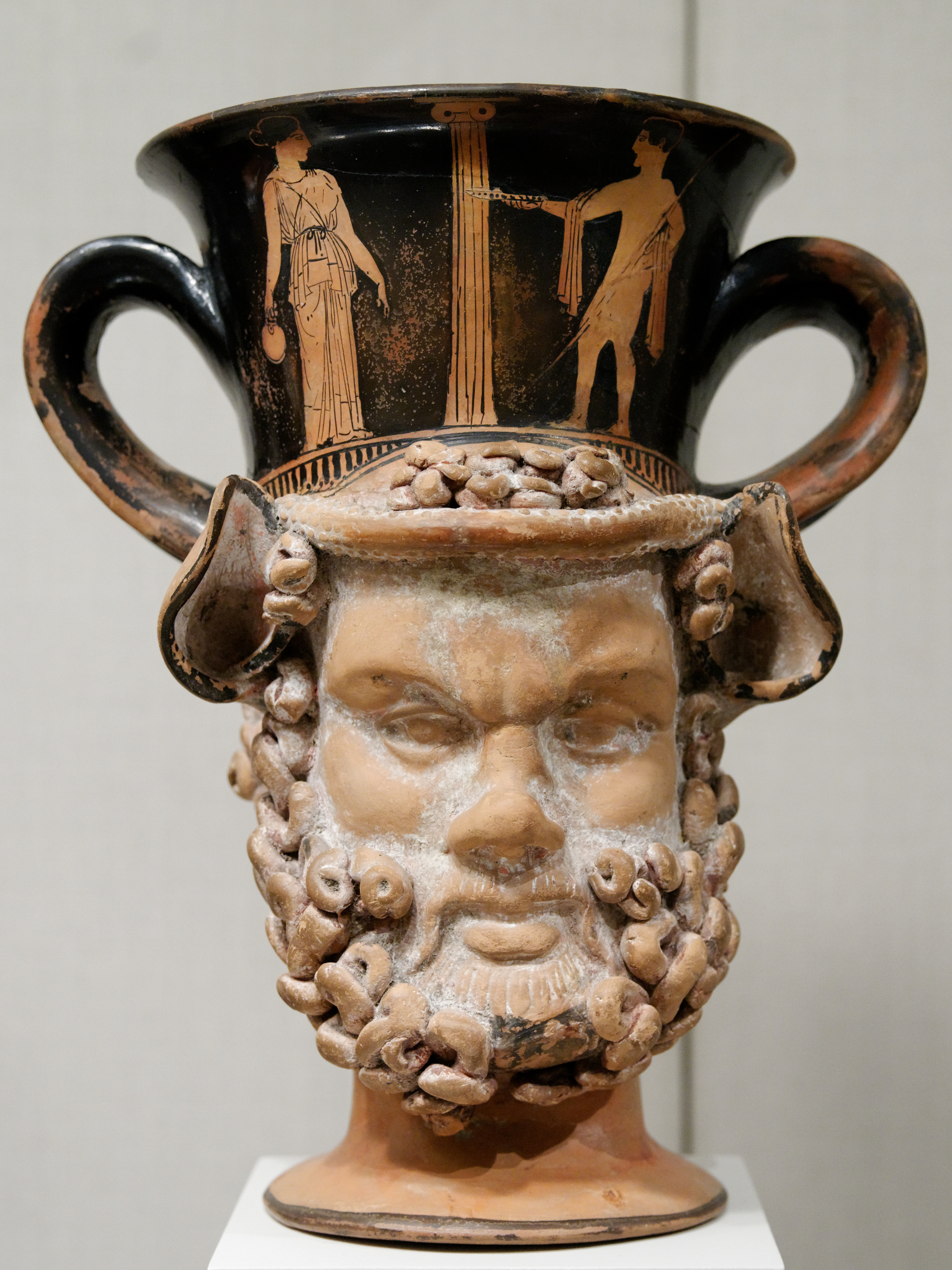
Satyr side of a janiform kantharos by Aison (420 BC)

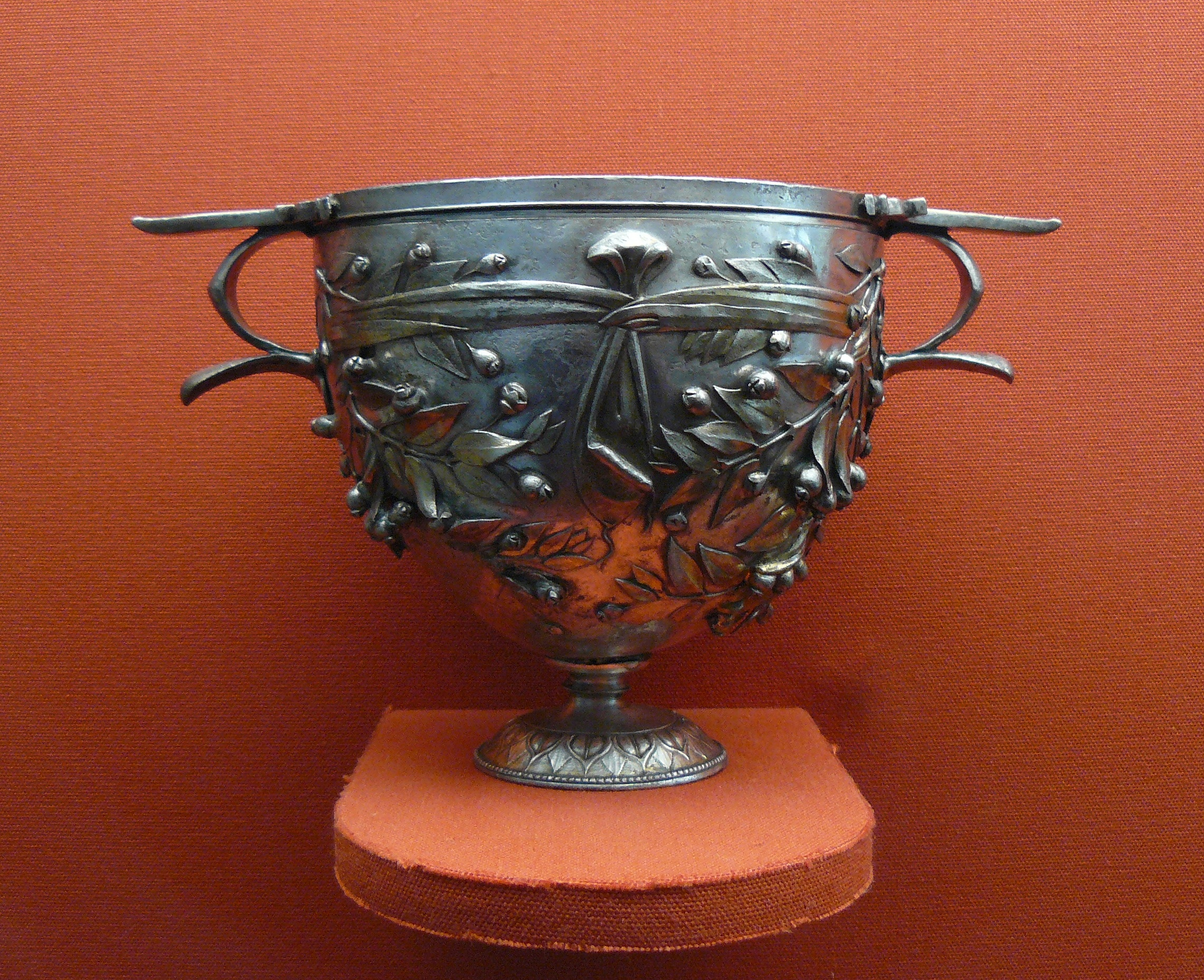
Silver kantharos (Gaul, present-day Alise-Sainte-Reine, latter 1st century BC)

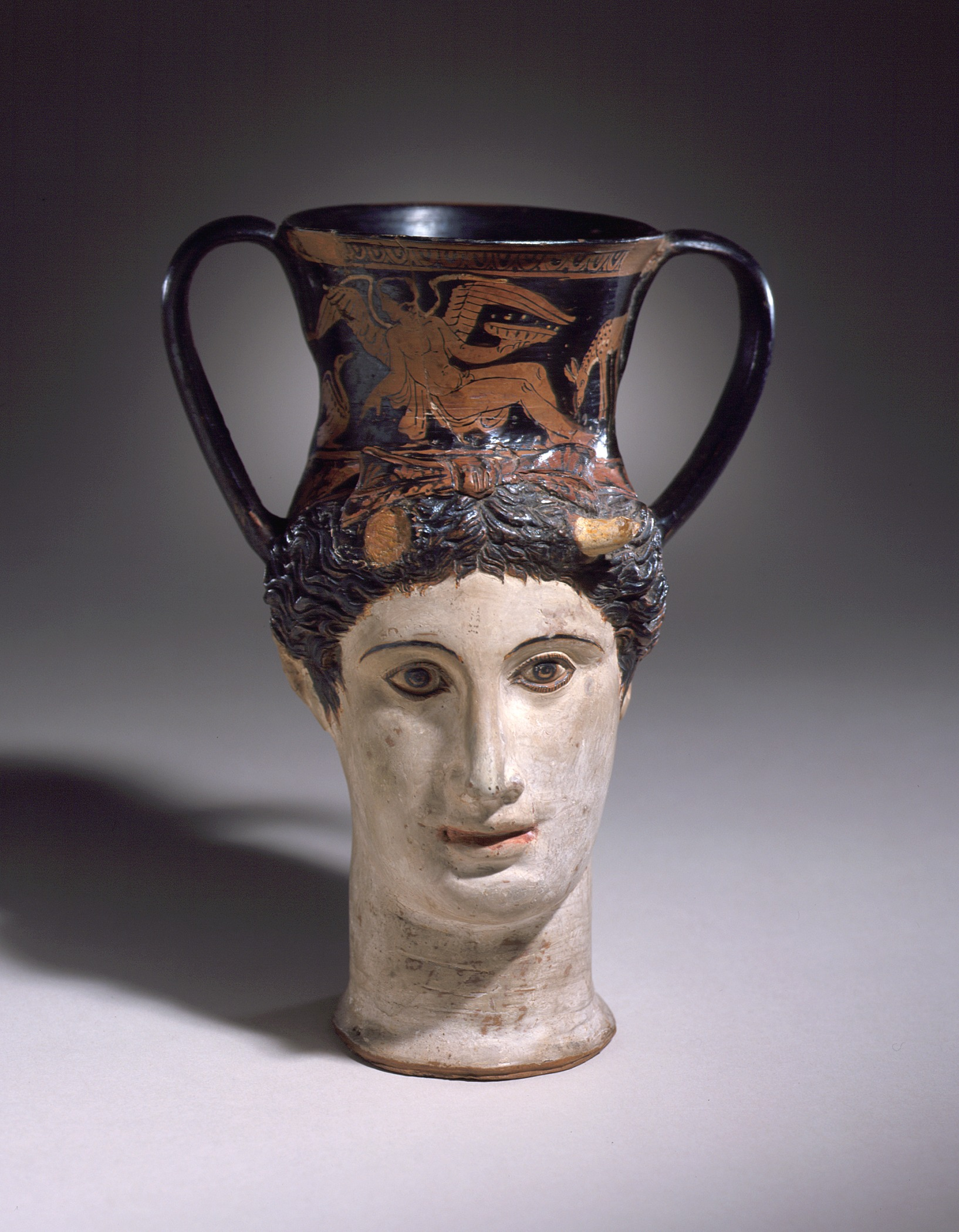
Iliupersis Painter (Southern Italy, active 375–350 BC), Head-Kantharos of a Female Faun or Io (?), red-figure pottery

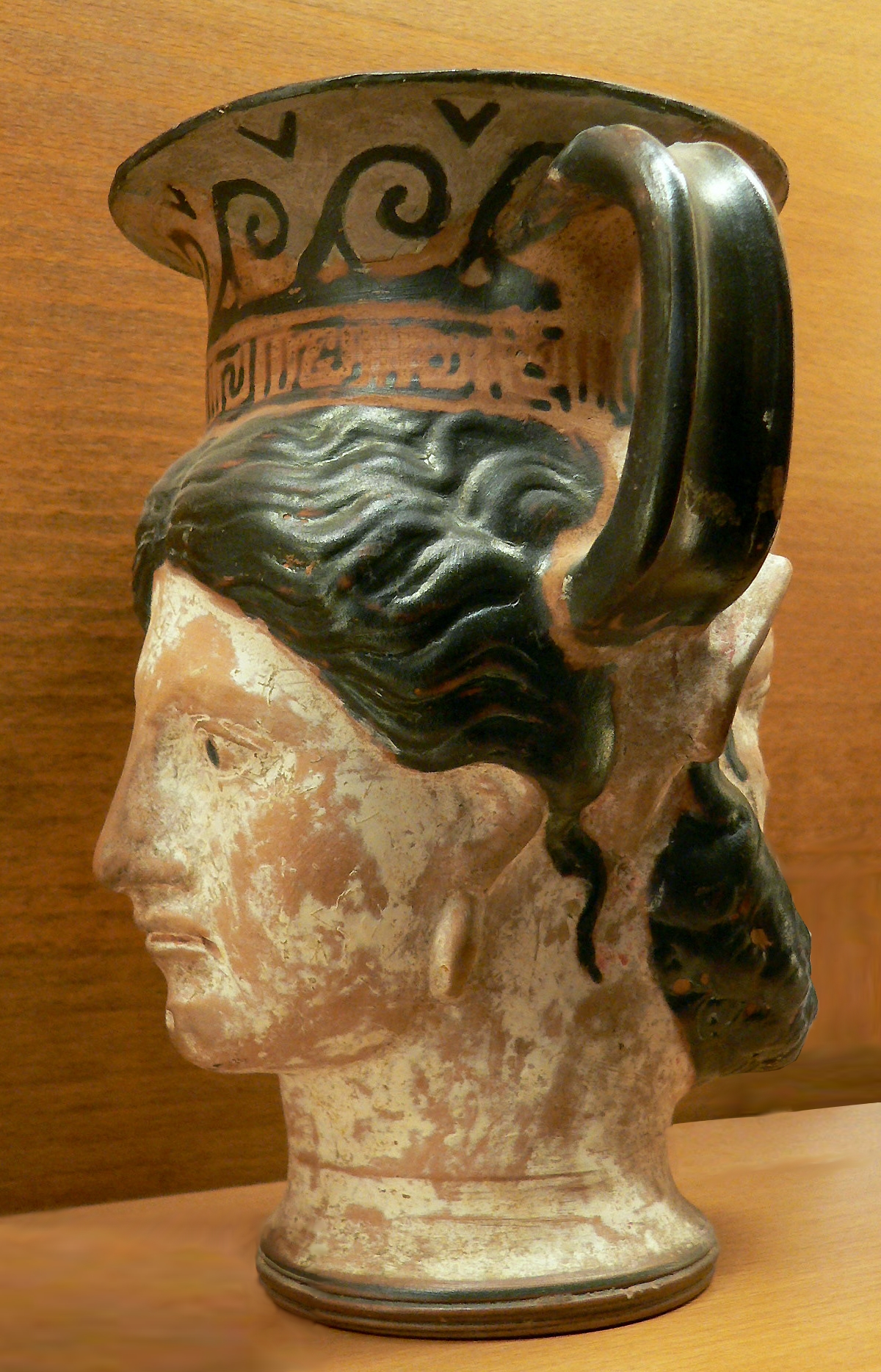
Janiform kantharos, Etruscan pottery, second half of the 4th century BC

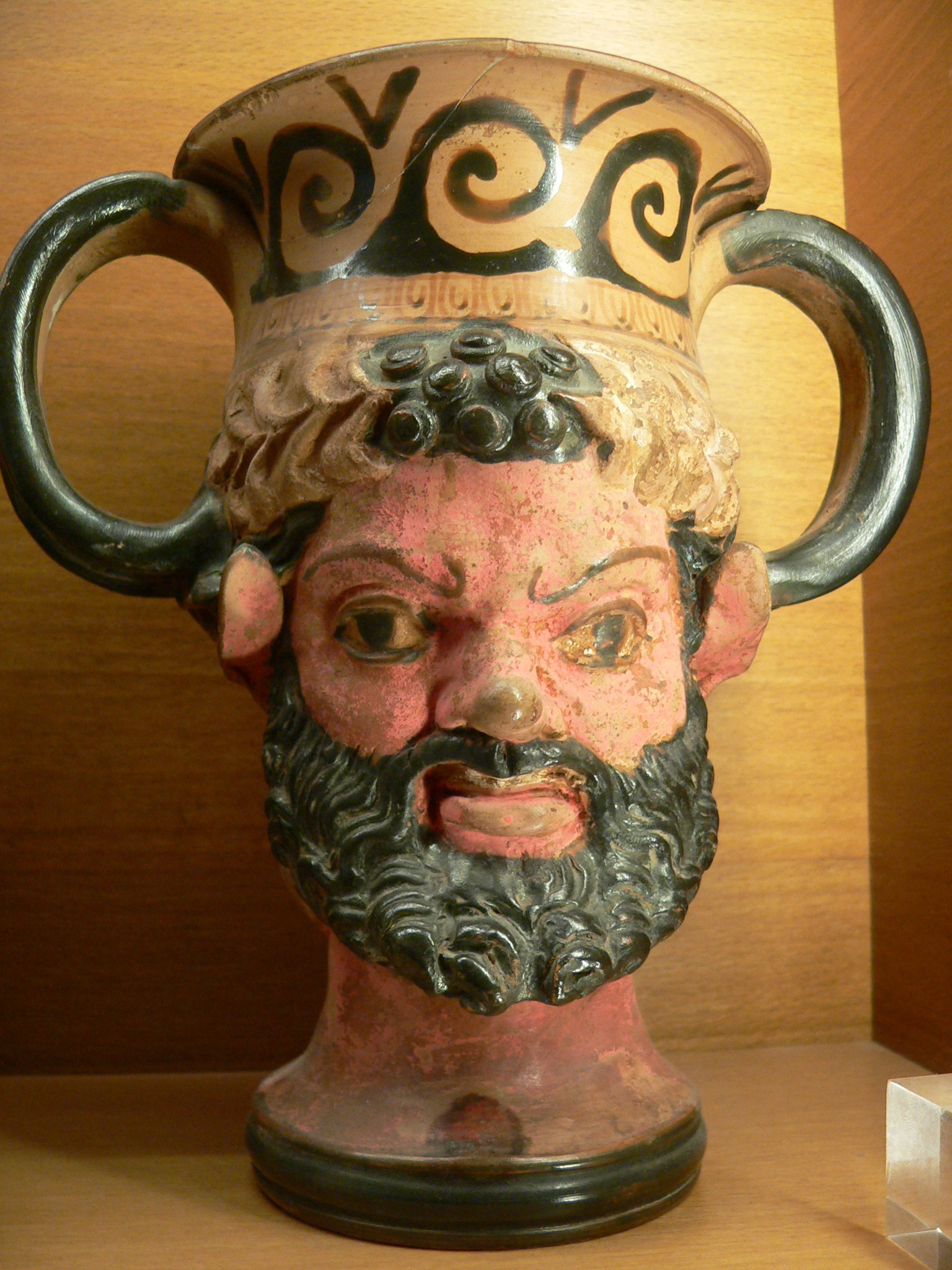
Kantharos Janus. Kantharos plastic double head: satyr head (shown here) and female head, group Chiusi, 2nd half of the fourth century BC. BC, terracotta.

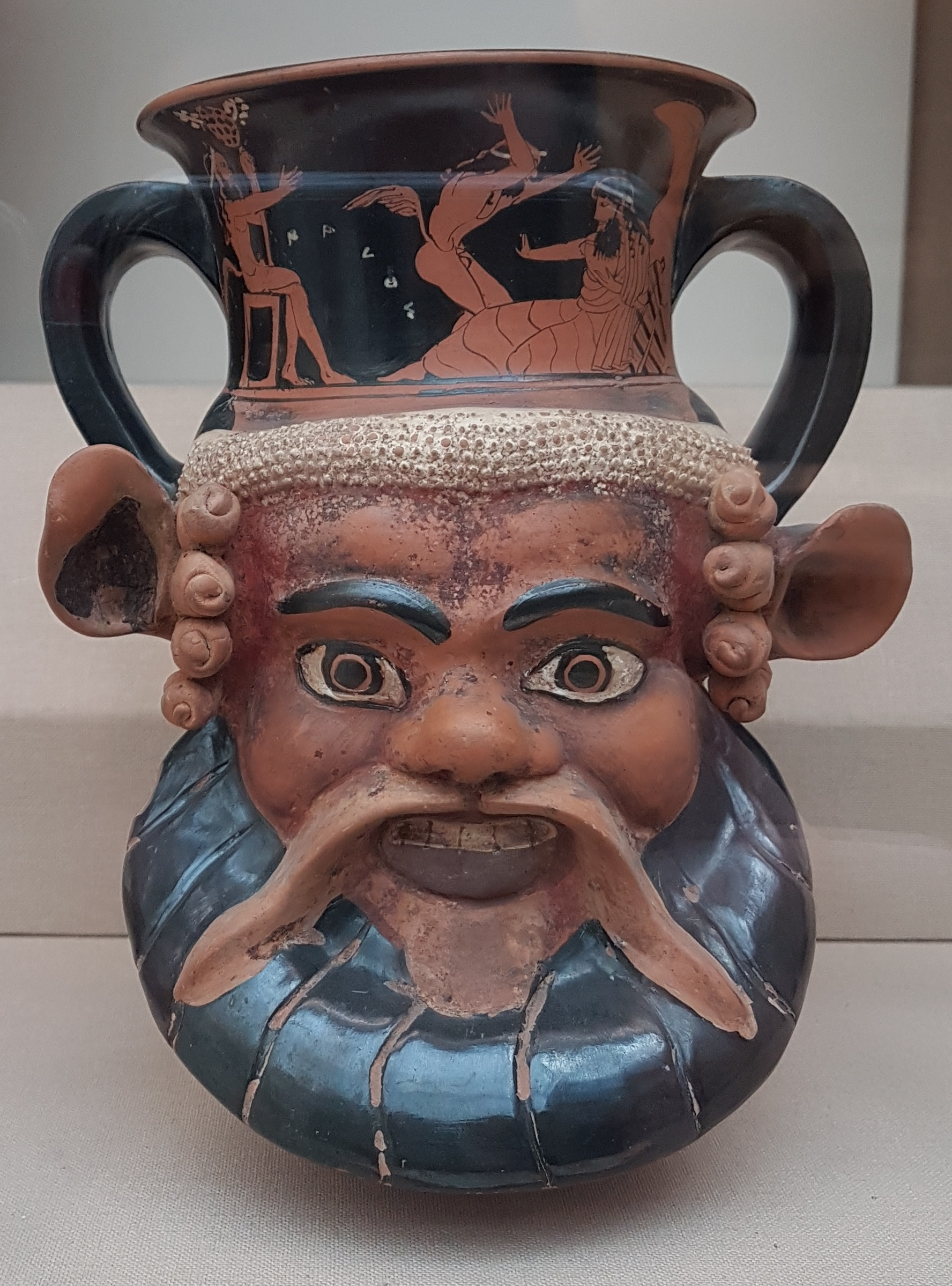
kantharos, made in Athens, c. 470 BC, British Museum

== See also ==
- Kylix
- Rhyton
- Ancient Greek vase painting
- Pottery of ancient Greece
