= Eridian =

Eridian can refer to:

- an adjective, related to Eris, a dwarf planet in the Solar System;
- an adjective, related to Constellation Eridanus (abbrev: Eri)
  - an alien species from the novel Project Hail Mary by Andy Weir, from 40 Eridani (40 Eri) star system in the Eridanus constellation
- an ancient, extinct alien species from the Borderlands series, from the fictional planet Eridanus

== See also ==
- Eris (disambiguation)
- Eridan (disambiguation)
- Eridani
- Eridania (disambiguation)
- Eridanus (disambiguation), including "Eridani"
- Erid (disambiguation)
- ERI (disambiguation)
