= Dongzhuosu =

Dongzhuosu 东卓宿镇
- Town
- Location in Hebei
- Coordinates: 38°00′55″N 115°08′46″E
- Country: People's Republic of China
- Province: Hebei
- Prefecture-level city: Shijiazhuang
- County-level city: Jinzhou
- Village-level divisions: 23 villages
- Elevation: 44 m (144 ft)
- Time zone: UTC+8 (China Standard)
- Area code: 0311

Dongzhuosu (simplified Chinese: 东卓宿; traditional Chinese: 東卓宿; pinyin: Dōngzhuōsù) is a town under the administration of Jinzhou City in south-central Hebei province, China, located roughly equidistant from Jinzhou and Xinle. As of 2011, it has 23 villages under its administration.

== See also ==
- List of township-level divisions of Hebei
