= Penthesilea Painter =

5th-century BC Greek vase painter

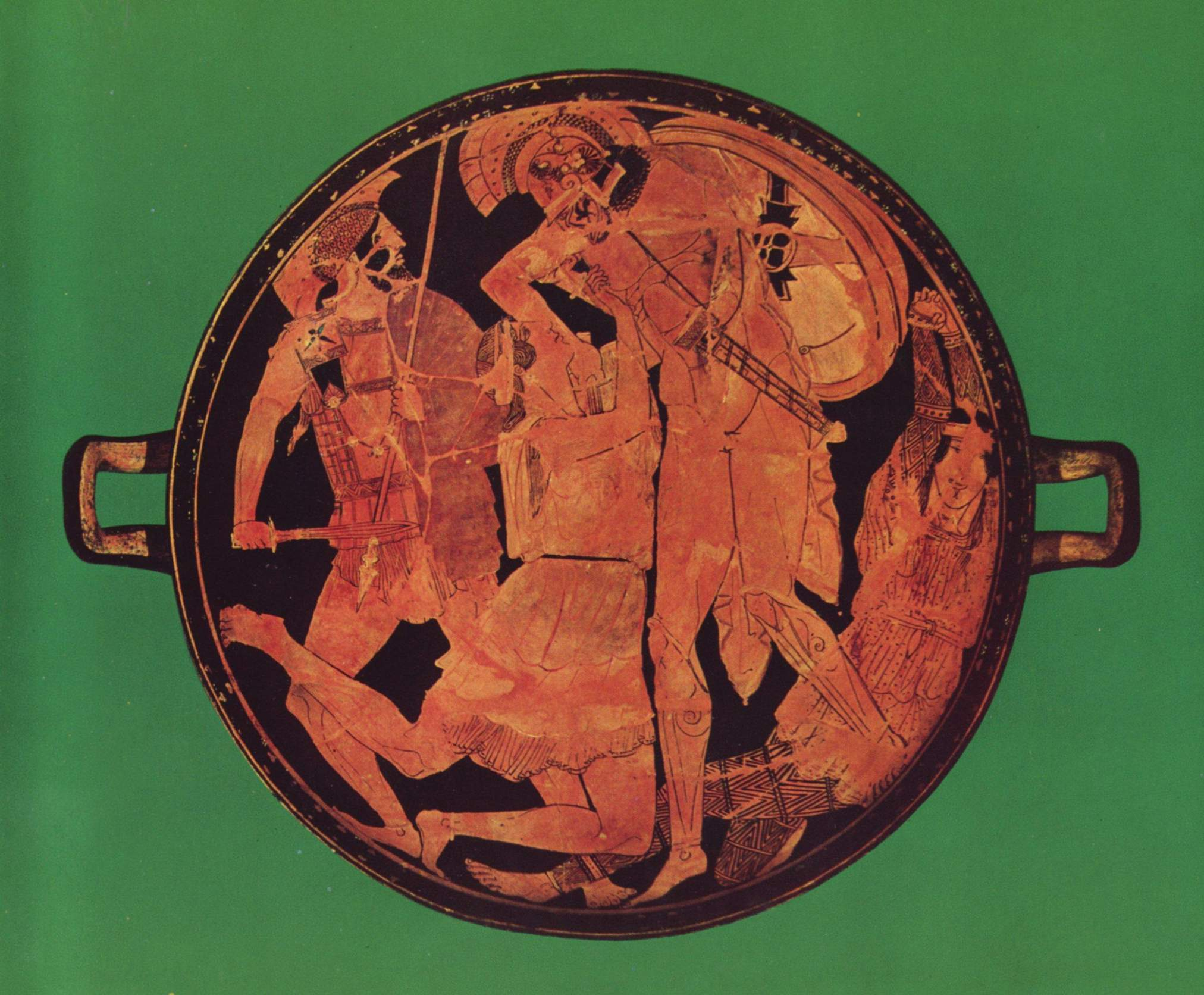
Depiction of Penthesilea, on a bowl from Vulci; circa 470/460 BC. Munich, Staatliche Antikensammlungen.

The Penthesilea Painter (active between 470 and 450 BC at Athens) was a Greek vase painter of the Attic red-figure style. His true name is unknown. His conventional name is derived from his name vase, "bowl 2688" in Munich, the inside of which depicts the slaying of Penthesilea by Achilles. On the basis of that work, John Beazley attributed 177 known vases to the painter, about 100 of which only survive fragmentarily. Bowls, 149 in number, represent the bulk of his work. The rest is distributed among small shapes like skyphoi, kantharoi and bobbins.

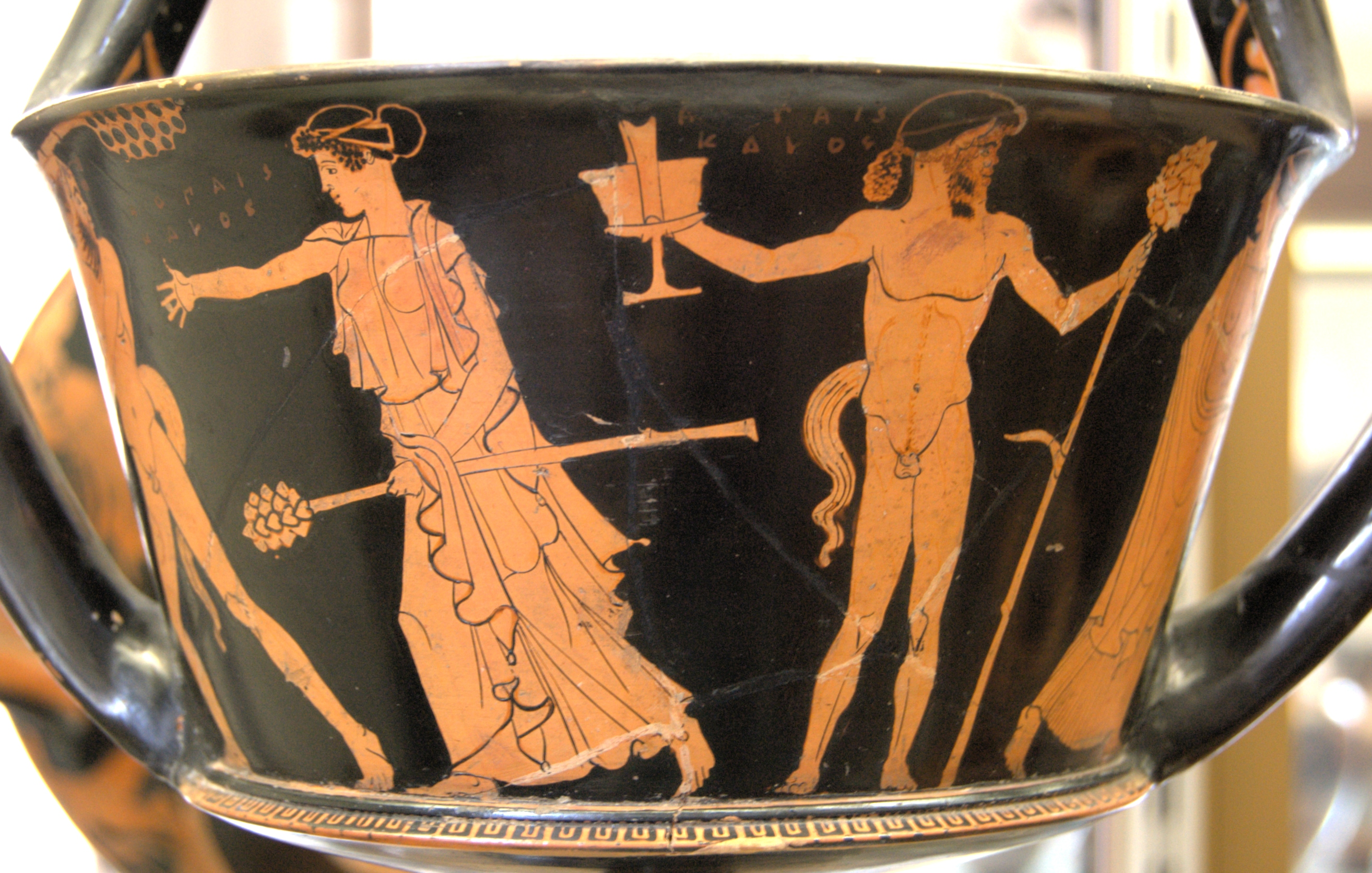
Satyr and maenad on a skyphos, Paris, Bibliothèque Nationale, Cabinet des Médailles.

His work is characterised by large, space-filling figures whose posture is often bent so as to permit them to fit on a vessel. For the same reason, ornamental decoration around the edges is often very narrow. His works are also characterised by being very colourful, permitting several intermediate shades. Apart from dark coral red and the usual light red, he also used tones of brown, yellow, yellow-white and gold. His figures are painted remarkably meticulously in every detail. Unlike many of his contemporaries, he appears to have painted the subsidiary or exterior images on his vases himself. An exception is his very early "bowl T 212" at the Museo Archeologico Nazionale in Ferrara, with exterior images by the Splanchnoptes Painter. The Penthesilea Painter's works are dominated by depictions of boys and youths engaged in athletic activity, teaching scenes, weaponry and armour, as well as scenes of people talking to horses. While he painted the occasional mythological motif, they are so rare that they should be considered an exception among his work. Throughout his career, scenes from everyday life gain an increasingly dominant share of his paintings.

In his later works, his love of detail is lost and replaced with stencil-like motifs, their basic compositions indistinguishable from typical mass-produced wares. His lines become more casual, but don't lose their certainty, so that even these works preserve a distinctive charm, marking him as one of the great masters of Greek vase painting. His true mastery is increasingly found in the subsidiary images of boys, on which he appears to have concentrated more and more.

His major importance for Classical vase painting lies in the fact that he moved away from the usual motifs and replaced them with typical motifs from everyday life. His emphasis on human aspects represented a new departure and was to be an important influence on the further development of vase painting.

Apart from the Penthesilea bowl, "bowl 2689", also in Munich, is considered his other masterpiece. Its interior shows the slaying of Tityos by Apollo.

== Selected works ==
Name	Images	Dimensions	Type	Date	Description	Museum record
Berlin, Antikensammlung
bowl skyphos F 2591						
fragment of a skyphos 31573, V. 162						
Bologna, Museo Civico
fragment of a krater 289	Image	----	Calyx krater	c.450	Amazonomachy	
bowl PU 272						
Boston, Museum of Fine Arts
skyphos 01.8032		H. 23 cm; D. 23 cm	Red-figure skyphos	c.450 BC	Maenads and Pans	Record
bowl 03.815		H. 15.5 cm	red-figure kylix	c.460 BC	Int: Nymph with scepter and vase; Ext: Two women and four youths	Record
bowl 13.84		H. 27 cm; D. 27 cm	red-figure kylix	c.450 BC	Int: Youth talking to woman; Ext: Satyrs and Maenads	Record
bowl 28.48		H. 9.8 cm; D. 23.8 cm	red-figure kylix	c.460 BC	Int: Two boys talking; Ext: Boys at the gymnasium	Record
Cambridge, Massachusetts, Harvard University Art Museums
kylix 1925.30.130		H. 11.3 cm.; D. 27.3 cm	Attic Red Figure kylix	470-460 BC	Int: Satyr and maenad; ExtA: Warrior presented to Zeus by Iris; ExtB: Departing warrior, with Iris.	
Chicago, IL, Art Institute of Chicago
Kylix 1889.27			Attic Red-figure kylix	460 BC	Int: Youth with woman.	Record
Ferrara, Museo Archeologico Nazionale
bowl T 18 C		----	Attic Red-figure kylix	460-450 BC	Int: Apotheosis of Theseus, Ext: Combat	
bowl T 212						
Hamburg, Museum für Kunst und Gewerbe
bowl 1900.164	Images	----	Red-figure kylix	c.450 BC	Int: boy seated with lyre, and youth; Ext: youths and horses	
London, British Museum
bowl E 72						
Madison, Wisconsin, Chazen Museum of Art
Kylix 1976.31		H. 15.25 cm; D. 45.56 cm	Red-figure kylix	c.455 BC	Int: Theseus fighting the bull of Marathon	Record
Munich, Glyptothek and Antikensammlung
kantharos 2565						
Penthesilea bowl (2688)		H. 7 cm; D. 43 cm	Attic red-figure kylix	470–460 BC	Achilles killing Penthesilea	
bowl 2689		H. 7 cm; D. 40 cm	Attic red-figure kylix	460–450 BC	Apollo, Tityos and a goddess (probably Gaia defending her son, or Leto).	
New York, Metropolitan Museum of Art
skyphos 06.1079		H. 16.2 cm; D. 30.2 cm	Red-figure skyphos	c.460 BC	A & B: A young man goes to war	Record
pyxis 07.286.36		H. 12.1 cm D. 17.2 cm	Attic white-ground pyxis with lid	460-450	The Judgement of Paris	Record
bobin 28.167		D. 12.8 cm	Attic white-ground bobbin	460-450 BC	A: Nike & a youth; B: Eros and a youth	Record
bowl 41.162.9		H. 16.4 cm; D. 36.7 cm	Red-figure kylix	c.460 BC	Int: Man hunting boar; Ext: Athletes	Record
Oxford, Ashmolean Museum
bowl 1931.12	Image		Red-figure kylix	c.450	Int: Nike dressing a bull for sacrifice	
Paris, Bibliothèque Nationale (Cabinet des Médailles)
De Ridder 814		H. 12.6 cm, L. 41.9 cm, D. 33.7 cm	Red-figure kylix	480 - 450 BC	Int: Horseman; Ext: Arming scene	Record
De Ridder 849		H. 28.9 cm, L. 28.2 cm, D. 20.6 cm	Red-figure kantharos	c.460 BC	Satyrs and Maenads	Record
Paris, Musée National du Louvre
bowl G 382						
bowl G 448		H. 16.50 cm; L. 44.80 cm; D. 36.10 cm	Attic red-figure kylix	460–450 BC	Int: Silenus and maenad	
Philadelphia, University Museum
hydria L-64-41	Image	dimensions	Red-figure hydria	460-450 BC	Three women in a domestic scene	
kylix L-637-1a	Image	H. 12.5 cm; D. 45.7 cm	Red-figure kylix	520-420 BC	Int: Boy propositioning a girl; Ext: Departure of young horsemen	
kylix MS 2495	Image	H. 9 cm; D. 24 cm	Red-figure kylix	475-450 BC	Int: Two boys facing; Ext: Nike and young citizens	
kylix MS 5693	Image	H. 7.8 cm; D. 29 cm	Red-figure kylix	460-450 BC	Int: Two boys at the gymnasium; Ext: Nike parts a boy and a man	
Vienna, Kunsthistorisches Museum
bowl 3700						

== Bibliography ==
- Hans Diepolder. Der Penthesilea-Maler. Leipzig 1936. (Bilder griechischer Vasen, 10).
- John Beazley. Attic Red Figure Vase Painters. Oxford: Clarendon Press, 1963
