= Aeris =

Aeris may refer to:

- Aeris (airline), a defunct French airline
- Aerius of Sebaste, also known as Aëris
- Tata Aeris, a subcompact sedan

== In fiction ==
- Aerith Gainsborough (initially mistranslated as Aeris), character from Final Fantasy VII and other works in the Final Fantasy saga

== In film ==
- Aeris (film), a film about a kitten with feline infectious peritonitis

== See also ==
- Aries (disambiguation)
- Eris (disambiguation)
