= Mayu, Hebei =

Coordinates: 37.97081°N 115.12245°E

Mayu 马于镇
- Town

Chinese transcription(s)
- Interactive map of Mayu
- Country: China
- Province: Hebei
- Prefecture: Shijiazhuang
- County-level city: Jinzhou
- Time zone: UTC+8 (China Standard Time)

Mayu (simplified Chinese: 马于; traditional Chinese: 馬於; pinyin: Mǎyú) is a township-level division of Jinzhou, Shijiazhuang, Hebei, China.

== See also ==
- List of township-level divisions of Hebei
