= Arys =

Arys may refer to:

== People ==
- Evelyn Arys (born 1990), Belgian racing cyclist

== Places ==
- Arys, Kazakhstan
- Arys (lake), Kazakhstan
- Arys (river), Kazakhstan
- Orzysz (German or Lithuanian: Arys), Poland
- Orzysz (lake) (German: Arys-See), in Poland

== See also ==
- Aris (disambiguation)
