= Aris (surname) =

Aris is a surname. Notable people with the name include:

- Alexander Aris (born 1973), civil rights activist of British and Burmese descent
- Ben Aris (1937–2003), English actor
- Ernest Aris (1882–1963) (also known as Robin A Hood and Dan Crow), Author and illustrator of children's books
- Helmut Aris (1908–87), Jewish politician in the GDR
- John Aris (1843–1927), English-born New Zealand cricketer
- Jonathan Aris (born 1971), British actor
- Michael Aris (1946–99), British historian specialising in Bhutanese, Tibetan and Himalayan culture and history
- Rutherford Aris (1929–2005), Chemical engineer
