= Huaishu, Hebei =

Huaishu 槐树镇
- Town
- Location in Hebei
- Coordinates: 38°04′58″N 115°03′33″E
- Country: People's Republic of China
- Province: Hebei
- Prefecture-level city: Shijiazhuang
- County-level city: Jinzhou
- Village-level divisions: 18 villages
- Elevation: 43 m (141 ft)
- Time zone: UTC+8 (China Standard)
- Postal code: 052260
- Area code: 0311

Huaishu (simplified Chinese: 槐树; traditional Chinese: 槐樹; pinyin: Huáishù; lit. 'locust tree') is a town under the administration of Jinzhou City in southwestern Hebei province, China, located about 6 kilometres (3.7 mi) north-northeast of downtown Jinzhou opposite G1811 Huanghua–Shijiazhuang Expressway. As of 2011, it has 18 villages under its administration.

== See also ==
- List of township-level divisions of Hebei
