= Arieș (disambiguation) =

The Arieș (Hungarian: Aranyos) is a river in Romania, a tributary of the Mureș.

Arieș may also refer to the following places in Romania:

- Arieș, a tributary of the Râul Mic in Alba County
- Arieș (Someș), a tributary of the Someș
- Baia de Arieș, a town in Alba County

== See also ==
- Aries (disambiguation)
