= Zhoujiazhuang Township =

Coordinates: 38.0214°N 115.0879°E

Zhoujiazhuang Township 周家庄乡
- Township

Chinese transcription(s)
- Interactive map of Zhoujiazhuang Township
- Country: China
- Province: Hebei
- Prefecture: Shijiazhuang
- County-level city: Jinzhou
- Time zone: UTC+8 (China Standard Time)

Zhoujiazhuang Township
- Traditional Chinese: 周家莊
- Simplified Chinese: 周家庄
Transcriptions
Standard Mandarin
- Hanyu Pinyin: Zhōujiāzhuāng
- Wade–Giles: Chou^{1}-chia^{1}-chuang^{1}

Zhoujiazhuang Township (simplified Chinese: 周家庄; traditional Chinese: 周家莊; pinyin: Zhōujiāzhuāng) is a township-level division of Jinzhou, Shijiazhuang, Hebei, China. The township currently operates the only remaining people's commune system in China.

== See also ==
- List of township-level divisions of Hebei
