= Taoyuan, Jinzhou, Hebei =

Taoyuan 桃园镇
- Town

Chinese transcription(s)
- Interactive map of Taoyuan
- Country: China
- Province: Hebei
- Prefecture: Shijiazhuang
- County-level city: Jinzhou
- Time zone: UTC+8 (China Standard Time)

Taoyuan (Chinese: 桃园镇) is a township-level division of Jinzhou, Shijiazhuang, Hebei, China.

== See also ==
- List of township-level divisions of Hebei
