= Zongshizhuang =

Coordinates: 37°52′N 115°03′E

Zongshizhuang 总十庄镇
- Town

Chinese transcription(s)
- Interactive map of Zongshizhuang
- Country: China
- Province: Hebei
- Prefecture: Shijiazhuang
- County-level city: Jinzhou
- Time zone: UTC+8 (China Standard Time)

Zongshizhuang (simplified Chinese: 总十庄; traditional Chinese: 總十莊; pinyin: Zǒngshízhuāng) is a township-level division of Jinzhou, Shijiazhuang, Hebei, China.

== See also ==
- List of township-level divisions of Hebei
