= Jinzhou, Hebei =

Jinzhou 晋州市
- County-level city
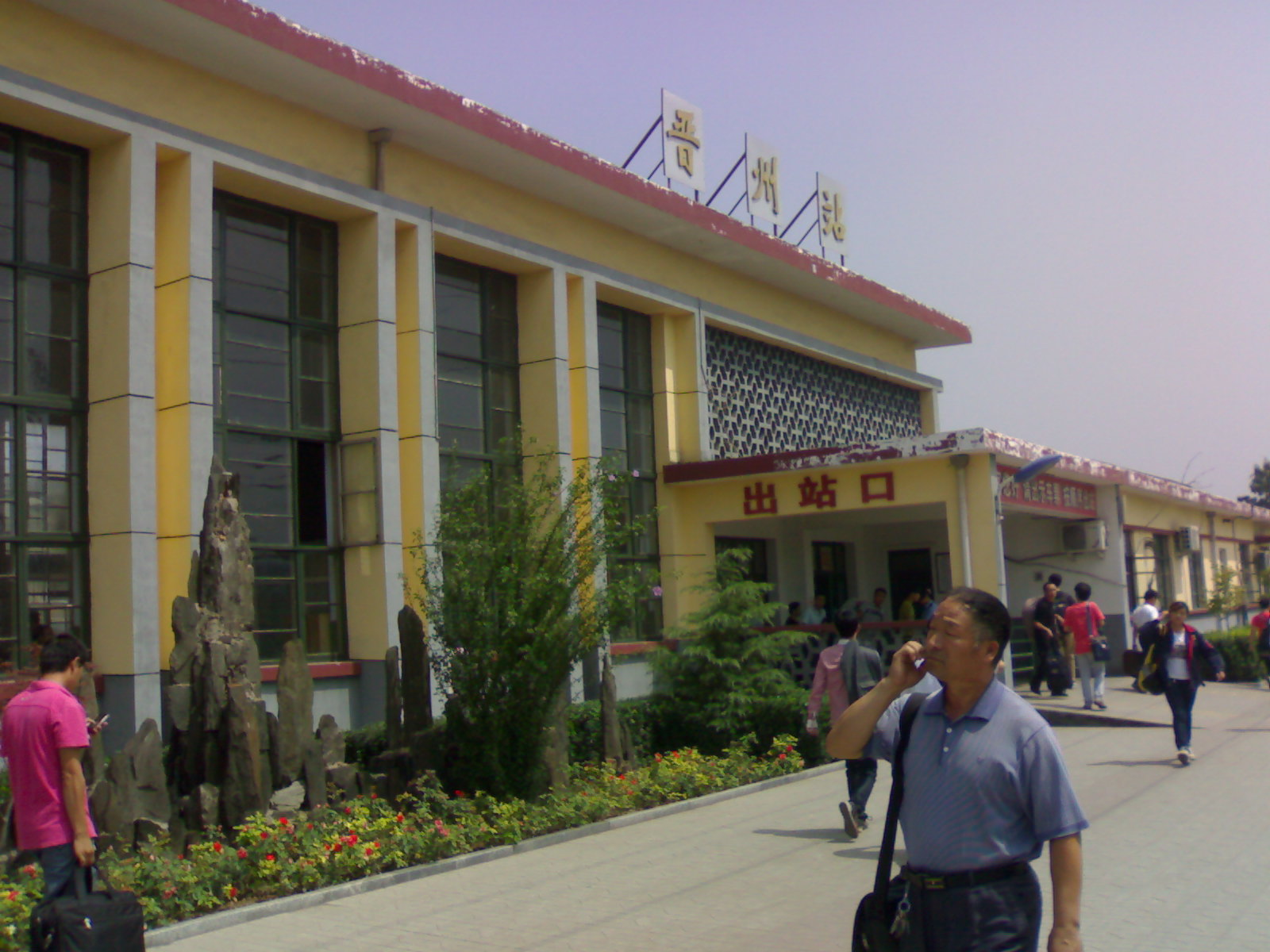
- Jinzhou railway station
- Interactive map of Jinzhou
- Location in Hebei
- Coordinates: 38°02′02″N 115°02′38″E
- Country: People's Republic of China
- Province: Hebei
- Prefecture-level city: Shijiazhuang
- Township-level divisions: 9 towns 1 township
- Established: November 1991
- Municipal seat: Jinzhou, Jinzhou

Area
  - County-level city: 619.0 km^{2} (239.0 sq mi)
  - Urban: 90.78 km^{2} (35.05 sq mi)
- Elevation: 47 m (154 ft)

Population (2017)
  - County-level city: 582,000
  - Density: 940/km^{2} (2,440/sq mi)
  - Urban: 139,600
- Time zone: UTC+8 (China Standard)
- Postal code: 052200
- Area code: 0311
- Website: jzchina.gov.cn

Jinzhou (simplified Chinese: 晋州; traditional Chinese: 晉州; pinyin: Jìnzhōu; lit. 'Jin Prefecture') is a county-level city of Hebei Province, North China. It is under the administration of the prefecture-level city of Shijiazhuang, capital of Hebei. Until November 1991, it was known as Jin County (simplified Chinese: 晋县; traditional Chinese: 晉縣; pinyin: Jìn Xiàn).

Jinzhou is located in central Hebei province, 50 kilometres (31 mi) east of Shijiazhuang. It covers an area of 619 square kilometers, and as of 2010 census, has a population of about 537,700. It consists of nine towns and one township, as well as 224 villages.

Jinzhou has a recorded history of at least 2500 years. It was the hometown of Wei Zheng (魏征), a well-known and well-respected historical figure and official of early Tang dynasty. It is also, according to the Chinese government, the "duck pear town" (鸭梨之乡).

== Administrative divisions ==
There are 9 towns and 1 township:

- Jinzhou (晋州镇)
- Zongshizhuang (总十庄镇)
- Yingli (营里镇)
- Taoyuan (桃园镇)
- Dongzhuosu (东卓宿镇)
- Mayu (马于镇)
- Xiaoqiao (小樵镇)
- Huaishu (槐树镇)
- Donglizhuang (东里庄镇)
- Zhoujiazhuang Township (周家庄乡)

== Climate ==
Climate data for Jinzhou, elevation 42 m (138 ft), (1991–2020 normals, extremes 1981–2010)
Month	Jan	Feb	Mar	Apr	May	Jun	Jul	Aug	Sep	Oct	Nov	Dec	Year
Record high °C (°F)	16.8 (62.2)	24.0 (75.2)	32.2 (90.0)	33.8 (92.8)	39.0 (102.2)	40.5 (104.9)	42.6 (108.7)	36.8 (98.2)	36.1 (97.0)	32.6 (90.7)	26.3 (79.3)	20.4 (68.7)	42.6 (108.7)
Mean daily maximum °C (°F)	3.4 (38.1)	7.6 (45.7)	14.7 (58.5)	21.9 (71.4)	27.6 (81.7)	32.1 (89.8)	32.4 (90.3)	30.7 (87.3)	27.0 (80.6)	20.6 (69.1)	11.4 (52.5)	4.6 (40.3)	19.5 (67.1)
Daily mean °C (°F)	−1.9 (28.6)	1.7 (35.1)	8.4 (47.1)	15.5 (59.9)	21.5 (70.7)	26.2 (79.2)	27.6 (81.7)	26.1 (79.0)	21.3 (70.3)	14.6 (58.3)	6.1 (43.0)	−0.3 (31.5)	13.9 (57.0)
Mean daily minimum °C (°F)	−6.0 (21.2)	−2.7 (27.1)	3.2 (37.8)	9.8 (49.6)	15.7 (60.3)	20.8 (69.4)	23.4 (74.1)	22.2 (72.0)	16.9 (62.4)	9.9 (49.8)	2.0 (35.6)	−3.9 (25.0)	9.3 (48.7)
Record low °C (°F)	−17.8 (0.0)	−17.3 (0.9)	−8.8 (16.2)	−1.3 (29.7)	4.2 (39.6)	10.8 (51.4)	16.7 (62.1)	13.3 (55.9)	6.0 (42.8)	−3.8 (25.2)	−15.7 (3.7)	−22.8 (−9.0)	−22.8 (−9.0)
Average precipitation mm (inches)	2.0 (0.08)	5.0 (0.20)	8.7 (0.34)	24.2 (0.95)	33.4 (1.31)	54.2 (2.13)	114.9 (4.52)	114.2 (4.50)	44.6 (1.76)	23.9 (0.94)	13.3 (0.52)	3.1 (0.12)	441.5 (17.37)
Average precipitation days (≥ 0.1 mm)	1.5	2.5	2.4	4.8	5.9	8.0	11.2	9.8	6.6	5.0	3.8	1.9	63.4
Average snowy days	2.6	2.4	1.0	0.2	0	0	0	0	0	0	1.3	2.2	9.7
Average relative humidity (%)	54	50	48	53	57	59	72	76	70	64	64	59	61
Mean monthly sunshine hours	152.3	162.8	213.6	229.2	253.5	221.8	182.5	193.4	190.3	176.2	150.6	148.3	2,274.5
Percentage possible sunshine	50	53	57	58	57	50	41	46	52	51	50	50	51
Source: China Meteorological Administration

== Transport ==
- G1811 Huanghua–Shijiazhuang Expressway
- China National Highway 307
- Shijiazhuang–Dezhou Railroad
