= Hidetoshi =

- Gender: Male

Origin
- Origin: Japanese
- Meaning: Different meanings depending on the kanji used

Hidetoshi (written: 英寿, 英俊, 英敏, 英利, 秀俊, 秀敏, 秀利 or 秀稔) is a masculine Japanese given name. Notable people with the name include:

- Kitabayama Hidetoshi (北葉山 英俊; 1935–2010), Japanese sumo wrestler
- Kitazakura Hidetoshi (北桜 英敏; born 1971), Japanese sumo wrestler
- Hidetoshi Mitsusada (光貞 秀俊; born 1970), Japanese racing driver
- Hidetoshi Miyuki (三幸 秀稔; born 1993), Japanese footballer
- Hidetoshi Nagasawa (長澤 英俊; 1940–2018), Japanese sculptor and architect
- Hidetoshi Nakamura (中村 秀利), Japanese voice actor
- Hidetoshi Nakata (中田 英寿; born 1977), Japanese footballer
- Hidetoshi Nakanishi (中西 英敏; 1958–2026), Japanese judoka
- Hidetoshi Nishijima (actor) (西島 秀俊; born 1971), Japanese voice actor
- Hidetoshi Nishijima (politician) (西島 英利; born 1948), Japanese politician
- Hidetoshi Sato (佐藤 英利; born 1950), Japanese luger
- Shiratayama Hidetoshi (白田山 秀敏; born 1943), Japanese sumo wrestler
- Hidetoshi Wakui (和久井 秀俊; born 1983), Japanese footballer
