= Eris (confection) =

Iranian confection

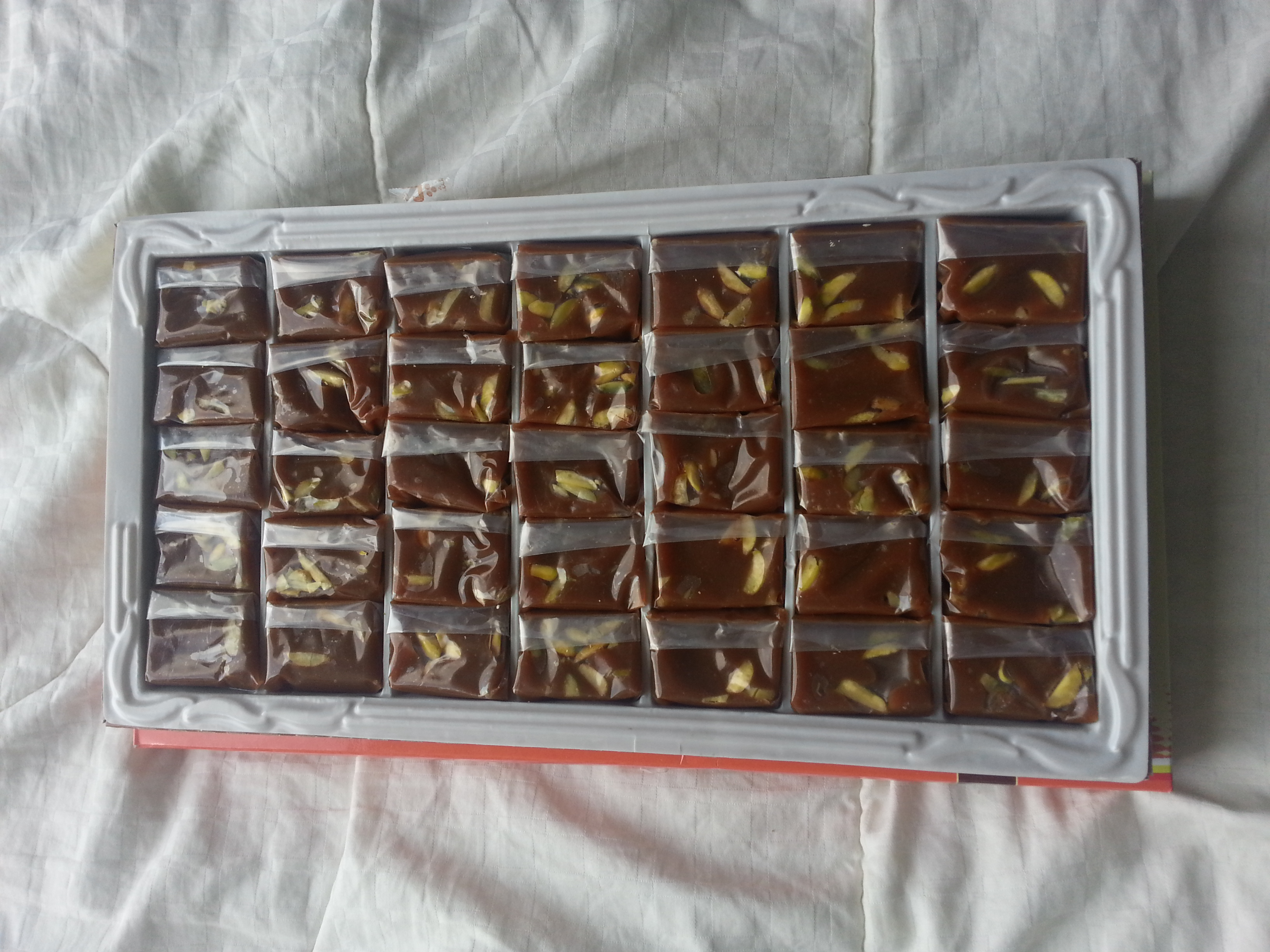
- Riss of Tabriz
- Type: confection
- Region or state: Iran (Tabriz, Ardabil)
- Main ingredients: pistachio, sugar, milk, vanilla
- Similar dishes: Nougat

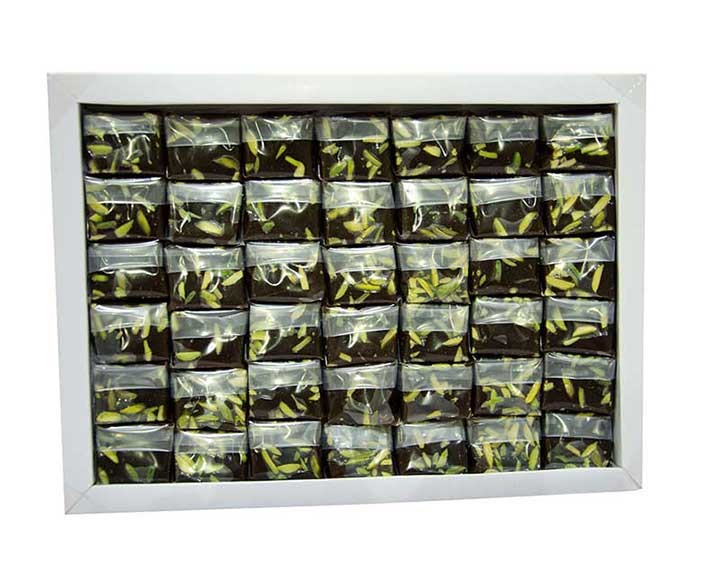
It is a box of Eris in the form of cube with cacao flavor.

Eris (تورکجه: اِریس) or Riss is one of Tabriz's most popular confections. It is made of pistachio, milk, sugar, vanilla, and butter.

It is made in variety of flavors and forms. It is also popular with the tourists that visit Tabriz, they usually buy it as a souvenir. It is also exported to other cities of Iran. Eris is not only for Tabriz. Eris is also one of the souvenirs of the ancient city of Ardabil. This candy is also known as pistachio chocolate. It has a very simple recipe, and can be made at home without difficulty.
