= Xiaoqiao, Hebei =

Coordinates: 38°04′05″N 115°08′15″E

Xiaoqiao (town) 小樵镇
- Town

Chinese transcription(s)
- Interactive map of Xiaoqiao (town)
- Country: China
- Province: Hebei
- Prefecture: Shijiazhuang
- County-level city: Jinzhou
- Time zone: UTC+8 (China Standard Time)

Xiaoqiao (town) (Chinese: 小樵; pinyin: Xiǎoqiáo) is a township-level division of Jinzhou, Shijiazhuang, Hebei, China.

== See also ==
- List of township-level divisions of Hebei
