= Yingli, Jinzhou, Hebei =

Coordinates: 37.82323°N 115.09242°E

Yingli 营里镇
- Town

Chinese transcription(s)
- Interactive map of Yingli
- Country: China
- Province: Hebei
- Prefecture: Shijiazhuang
- County-level city: Jinzhou
- Time zone: UTC+8 (China Standard Time)

Yingli (simplified Chinese: 营里; traditional Chinese: 營里; pinyin: Yínglǐ) is a township-level division of Jinzhou, Shijiazhuang, Hebei, China.

== See also ==
- List of township-level divisions of Hebei
