= USS Aries =

Three ships of the United States Navy have been named Aries:

- USS Aries (1863), scrapped in 1908
- USS Aries (AK-51)
- USS Aries (PHM-5)
