= Aries Telecoms =

- Type: Public limited company
- Industry: Telecommunications; Broadcasting
- Headquarters: Kuala Lumpur, Malaysia
- Area served: Malaysia
- Products: Broadband Internet; Digital voice; Home networking
- Website: www.ariestelecoms.com.my

Aries Telecoms (M) Berhad is a computer supplier founded in 1996 in Malaysia.

== History ==
It expanded into the field of system integration for small businesses, predominantly involving the design, deployment and maintenance of LAN solutions deploying Ethernet networking technologies. This gave them a platform to specialise in Ethernet network technology. By 2005, the business focus was changed to networking technologies and associated services. The company signed a contract with the Malaysian state of Malacca to implement a statewide wireless network project linking all government offices and facilities within the state of Malacca. This project was successfully launched on 3 October 2002 by the then Chief Minister of the State of Malacca, Datuk Seri Haji Mohd Ali Bin Mohd Rustam.

== Growth ==
The company began in 2004 to build Malaysia's first carrier class Metro Ethernet fiber optic border-to- border network spanning Peninsular Malaysia. Through a partnership with Fiberail Sdn Bhd, a subsidiary of Telecom Malaysia Berhad, which had deployed fiber optic cable along various of Malaysia's railways and pipelines, the Group capitalised on this existing network of unutilized dark fiber running from Padang Besar on the Thailand-Malaysia border to Johor Bahru on the Singapore-Malaysia border. Through various tech partnerships, the Group installed its current network switching technology and, following huge investment, the first phase of this nationwide Metro Ethernet network was completed and commissioned in December 2006. The company also installed its NOC in Kuala Lumpur at this time and network services to customers commenced in March 2007. Between 2006 and 2014, it continued to upgrade its national network to meet anticipated further growth of bandwidth demand in Peninsular Malaysia as well as preparing itself for expansion within the wider South East Asia region. The company constructed a further two cross-border networks spanning Peninsular Malaysia in 2012 and 2013; and three networks were built between 2006 and 2014 supporting the Klang Valley area.
