= Eridanus (disambiguation) =

Eridanus is a southern constellation abbreviated as "Eri".

Eridanus or Eridanos may also refer to:

== Places ==
=== Rivers ===
- Eridanos (mythology) (or Eridanus), a river in Greek mythology, somewhere in Central Europe, which was territory that Ancient Greeks knew only vaguely
- Eridanus, the Po River, according to Roman word usage
- Eridanos (Athens), a former river near Athens, now subterranean
- Eridanos (geology), a former large river that flowed between forty million and seven hundred thousand years ago from Lapland to the North Sea through where the Baltic Sea is now

=== Astronomy ===
- Eridanus Cluster of galaxies in the constellation Eridanus
- Eridanus II, a low-surface brightness dwarf galaxy in the constellation Eridanus
- Eridanus Supervoid, a large-scale cosmic underdensity

== Other uses ==
- USS Eridanus (AK-92), a ship of the United States Navy
- Eridanosaurus, a rhinocerotid originally described as a crocodilian

== See also ==
- Eridian (disambiguation)
- Eridani
- Eridan (disambiguation)
- ERI (disambiguation)
