= Airis Computer =

Defunct American computer company

Airis Computer Corporation
- Type: Private
- Industry: Computer
- Founded: July 24, 1989; 36 years ago
- Founders: Jeffrey A. Maziarek; Steven R. Valentor
- Defunct: January 2, 1993; 33 years ago
- Products: Airis VH-286

Airis Computer Corporation (originally Pair Computer Corporation) was a short-lived mail-order American computer company active from 1989 to 1993. Its only product, the Airis VH-286 notebook, was widely anticipated for its slim yet powerful design and long-battery life, owing to the use of disposable C batteries as its primary source of power. The product was met with a number of delays owing to FCC regulations and other unspecified reasons. Airis collapsed in 1993, amid the conclusion of a trademark infringement lawsuit with Harris Corporation; Airis' rights to their namesake trademark lapsed in late 1992. Both Byte and PC Magazine claim that Airis never sold any units of the laptop.

== History ==
=== Foundation ===
Airis Computer Corporation was founded in Chicago, Illinois, by Jeffrey A. Maziarek and Steven R. Valentor. The company was initially incorporated as Pair Computer Corporation on July 24, 1989, but the company soon changed it to Airis after a search for registered trademarks in their field turned up empty. Maziarek and Valentor were ex-employees of Zenith Data Systems who left that company after it had been acquired by Groupe Bull in 1989. Valentor was a systems engineer, while Maziarek worked in Zenith's marketing department. Talks into starting Airis had been ongoing for years while the two were employed at Zenith. The company's incorporation was kickstarted after the two received venture capital from Mark IV Realty Corporation in Chicago; as part of the agreement, Maziarek had to serve as vice president of sales and marketing for PaceMark Technologies, a printer peripheral maker whom Marks owned, for six months.

The two were joined in Airis by Maziarek's brother Mike, who was named president of the company. Before Airis, Mike Maziarek was formerly the head of a chain of picture-framing stores and had no prior experience in the tech sector. Airis was headquartered in an eight-room office on the second story of the Elston Corridor building on North Besley Court, the first floor of which was occupied by the Chicago Brewing Company. The two set out Airis to compete in the notebook computer marketplace with a powerful but inexpensive unit with a performant battery. They were to compete against market leaders such as Compaq and Toshiba. They delivered the first prototype of their first and only notebook to the Midwest Computer Show in Chicago in May 1990.

=== Airis VH-286 ===
The notebook was named the Airis VH-286 and featured an Intel 80286 microprocessor clocked at 12.5 MHz, a socket for an Intel 80287 math coprocessor, 2 MB of SIMM RAM standard (expandable to 4 MB), a built-in 2400-baud modem, and a monochrome super-twisted nematic LCD measuring 11 inches diagonally and capable of displaying video at VGA resolution, 640 by 480 pixels. (The prototype shown off to the Midwest Computer Show was only capable of displaying EGA video.) Airis sourced the notebook's 2.5-inch 20 MB hard drive from PrairieTek and Conner Peripherals; the drivers were supported by 256 KB of page cache. The computer's LCD driver meanwhile was sourced from Chips and Technologies, and its 82-key keyboard was built by EECO/Maxi-Switch. Airis chose a contract manufacturer in Des Plaines, Illinois, to assemble the notebook's printed circuit board. Its plastic shell was almost entirely snap-fit, save for the keyboard, which were held in from the bottom with two screws. Final assembly at the company's Chicago headquarters was said to take only three-and-a-half minutes, according to Maziarek and Valentor.

Unique for the time was the company's approach to batteries and BIOS for the VH-286. Although a conventional rechargeable nickel–cadmium battery could be ordered for the notebook, the laptop also supported the use of C batteries. Ten batteries were required for operation in the latter mode; the company boasted an up-to-20-hour charge on C batteries, albeit such batteries are disposable and cannot be recharged. The notebook's BIOS technology meanwhile made use of a 128-KB flash EEPROM chip manufactured by Intel. By loading a special utility on ROM which prompted users to dial into Airis' BBS using the notebook's built-in modem, customers could have upgraded the BIOS chip to new versions as they came out, potentially expanding the lifespan of the computer by introducing new features to the BIOS as well as patching firmware bugs and supporting newer hardware. The company dubbed this technology TeleROM. Of the BIOS chip's 128 KB of read-only memory, 32 KB is for system BIOS functions, 32 KB is for video BIOS, and the final 64 KB is for the TeleROM update utility.

The VH-286 measured 12 inches by 10 inches by 2 inches, weighed 6.5 pounds (2.9 kg) including all ten C batteries, and was built into a black plastic case, described by The New York Times as "strikingly attractive". The computer lacked a built-in 3.5-inch floppy drive, but an external drive was sold as an option, a decision the newspaper called controversial. The notebook came with MS-DOS 4.0 on ROM.

=== Delays and decline ===
The VH-286 was widely hyped in the general and tech press on its announcement in June 1990. The company received a positive review in the May 1990 issue of Byte and was featured on that issue's front cover. Airis billed the VH-286 for a September 1990 release date and US$1,899 street price in July that year. The company missed the deadline when they modified the design of the motherboard to include a VGA port socket for external video display in October, setting a new release date of November. Airis again pushed the release date back for a number of unknown reasons to an unspecified date in November 1990, at which point the company had reconfigured themselves as a strictly mail-order business. In December 1990, Airis received FCC Class B certification for the VH-286, and in February 1991 the company announced that the notebook would be available for sale that month. Airis by that point employed 10 people.

In January 1992, however, PC Magazine editor Bill Howard asserted that the VH-286 had never shipped, Byte later repeating this claim in July 1995. In October 1991, the Harris Corporation had filed a lawsuit with the United States Patent and Trademark Office against Airis for trademark infringement, which concluded in 1993. In that time, Airis let the rights to their namesake trademark lapse, in December 1992. Airis themselves collapsed on January 2, 1993.

== See also ==
- Vaporware
- NEC UltraLite
