= Codrus Painter =

Classical Greece vase painter

The Codrus Painter was a Greek vase-painter of the Attic red-figure style, who flourished between 440 and 420 BC. His actual name is unknown and his conventional name is derived from his name-vase, now in Bologna, which depicts the mythical Athenian king, Codrus. He is most famous for his red-figure kylix showing the deeds of Theseus, now in the British Museum. Stylistically the Codrus Painter is close to the Aison and the Eretria Painter, and his vases have been found in three tombs with these artists.
