= Murat Eriş =

Turkish table tennis player

Personal information
- Full name: Murat Eriş
- Nationality: Turkey
- Born: 21 January 1970 (age 56) Istanbul, Turkey
- Height: 1.72 m (5 ft 8 in)

Sport
- Sport: Table tennis
- Playing style: All round player

Murat Eriş (born 21 Ocak 1970) is a male Turkish table tennis player. He has been playing for Fenerbahçe TT since 2006 and also played for Ted Yeşilyurt and Sarkuysan in Turkey.

== Major achievements ==
- 1-time Turkish champion
- 3-time Turkish Super League champion
- 1-time ETTU Cup runner-up
