= Jinzhou, Jinzhou =

Jinzhou Town 晋州镇
- Town
- Location in Hebei
- Coordinates: 37°52′13″N 114°23′52″E
- Country: People's Republic of China
- Province: Hebei
- Prefecture-level city: Shijiazhuang
- County-level city: Jinzhou
- Village-level divisions: 43 villages
- Elevation: 48 m (157 ft)
- Time zone: UTC+8 (China Standard)
- Postal code: 052200
- Area code: 0311

Jinzhou (simplified Chinese: 晋州; traditional Chinese: 晉州; pinyin: Jìnzhōu) is a town and the seat of Jinzhou City in southern Hebei province, China. As of 2011, it has 43 villages under its administration.

== See also ==
- List of township-level divisions of Hebei
