= Helmut Aris =

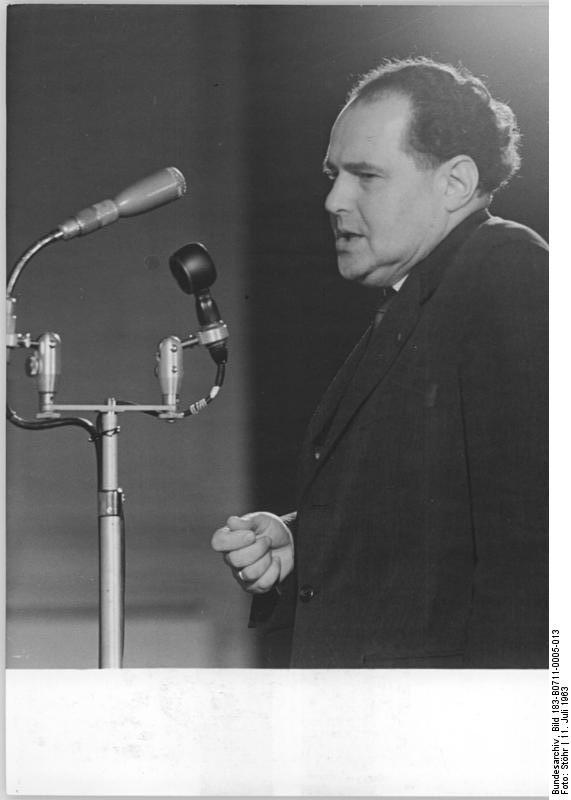
- Helmut Aris in 1963
- Born: 8 May 1908; Dreseden-Striesen, Saxony, Germany
- Died: 22 November 1987 (aged 79); Dresden, GDR (East Germany)
- Occupation: President of the Association of Jewish Communities
- Political party: SPD; SED
- Spouses: Susanne Reinfeld; Gertrud Honick (m. 1903–1986)
- Children: 2

Helmut Aris (8 May 1908 – 22 November 1987) became in 1962 the President of the Association of Jewish Communities in the German Democratic Republic, retaining the position till his death in 1987.

== Life ==
Helmut Aris was the son of Julius Aris, a metal worker originally from East Prussia, and his wife Recha Aris, née Stein. He was born in the Striesen district of Dresden in Saxony during the first decade of the twentieth century, a period of rapid industrialisation and social tensions. He attended the academically focused King George Gymnasium (a school in Dresden named after the local king) and then, in 1925, embarked on an apprenticeship on the commercial side of the textile business with a firm called "Hirsch & Co.", for whom he worked till 1929. He worked in the textile sector till 1938.

Aris married Susanne Reinfeld in 1933. Two children were born to the couple, named Heinz-Joachim and Renate. In November 1938 Aris was arrested. This was a manifestation of the anti-Jewish policies of the Nazi Party which had taken power in January 1933. Helmut Aris was Jewish. However, his wife Susanne came from an Evangelical Christian family and for this reason he was, at this stage released. A period of unemployment followed, after which, between 1940 and 1945, Aris was placed under a forced labour regime in a succession of businesses. His father died in 1940 and his mother was deported to Riga where she was murdered in 1942. Helmut Aris was scheduled to be deported on 16 February 1945, but it was never carried out on account of the very heavy bombing to which the city was subjected that week by British and American bombers.

In May 1945 World War II ended and his hometown of Dresden found itself in that part of what had been Germany that was now designated by the winning side as the Soviet occupation zone (SBZ). Membership of (non-Nazi) political parties was no longer illegal and Aris joined the newly formed Social Democratic Party (SPD). However, the Soviet Military Administration had a plan for what now began to mutate into the German Democratic Republic (East Germany). The plan involved a return to a one-party state, and in 1946 the SPD merged with the former Communist Party of Germany (KPD): members of both parties were invited, with a simple signature, to switch their party allegiance to the Socialist Unity Party (SED). In 1946 Helmut Aris joined the SED. Aris worked as CEO of a succession of industrial concerns from 1945, and till 1965 he also served as Executive Director at the Dresden-based Institute for the Chemical Industry businesses.

In the immediate post-war years Aris worked to rebuild what remained of the Jewish community and in 1953 he became a member of the Central Saxony Community Leadership council in succession to Leon Löwenkopf, the Union of Persecutees of the Nazi Regime (VVN) founder who had been imprisoned since 1950 (following a denunciation) and fled to the west in 1953. Aris was also elected to leadership of the Dresden Community Leadership in succession to Hans Ogrodek who had fled East Germany. It was reported that following the vast scale of the state mandated killings and deportations there were only 5,000 Jews remaining in what was becoming East Germany, of whom perhaps 10% were active in the communities.

In 1952 Aris was a co-founder of the Association of Jewish Communities in the German Democratic Republic. He became the association's vice-president in 1958 and in 1962 he succeeded Hermann Baden as president of the Association of Jewish Communities in the German Democratic Republic.

From March 1954 to July 1956 he is listed in the Stasi records among the country's thousands of Informal collaborators (IM) under the code name "IM Lanus", but he later denied having provided reports to the Security Services on Jewish Community members.

Between 1962 and 1987 Aris was a member of the presidium for the National Council of the National Front which was an alliance of minor political parties and mass movements that were represented on a quota basis in the National Assembly and controlled through the National Front by the country's ruling SED party. He was also a member of the East German committee for the "Fight against Racism Decade", the central leadership of the East German Committee of Anti-Fascist Resistance fighters, of the East German "League for the United Nations" and of the presidium of the East German Peace Council.

Helmut Aris died on 22 November 1987 in Dresden and was buried with his wife Gertrud in the city's New Jewish Cemetery.

== Awards and honours ==
- 1964 Service medal of the German Democratic Republic
- 1969 Ernist Moritz Arnt Medal of the East German National Front
- 1978 Patriotic Order of Merit
- 1983 Patriotic Order of Merit Honour clasp

Aris was also a recipient of the (East) German Peace medal.
