= Eris =

Eris most often refers to:

- Eris (mythology) or Discordia, the goddess of discord in Greek mythology
- Eris (dwarf planet), the second-largest known dwarf planet in the Solar System

Eris may also refer to:

== Fictional characters ==
- Eris Vanserra, the eldest son of Beron, the High Lord of the Autumn Court from the A Court of Thorns and Roses series
- Eris Morn, a character from the Destiny video game series
- Eris the Deceiver, a character from The Grim Adventures of Billy & Mandy
- Eris, a character from Star Trek Deep Space Nine episode "The Jem'Hadar"
- Eris, a character in Sinbad: Legend of the Seven Seas
- Eris, a character from the Asobi ni Iku yo!
- Eris, a character in Drakengard 2
- Eris, a character from Lego's Legends of Chima theme
- Eris, a character from KonoSuba
- Eris Boreas Greyrat, a character in Mushoku Tensei

== Other uses ==
- Eris (confection), a traditional confection of Tabriz
- Eris (fictional planet), a fictional planet in Damocles and its successor Mercenary III
- Eris (spider), a genus of jumping spiders
- Eris (simulation), a simulation of the Milky Way
- Eris, Ohio, a community in the United States
- Exoatmospheric Reentry-vehicle Interceptor Subsystem, a project of the Strategic Defense Initiative
- Gilmour Space Technologies § Eris orbital rocket, three-stage small-lift launch vehicle
- Stimulator of interferon genes, a protein that in humans is encoded by the TMEM173 gene
- The HTC Droid Eris, a variant of the HTC Hero mobile phone
- Regional Intervention and Security Teams, in French Équipes régionales d'intervention et de sécurité, acronym ÉRIS
- Eris (variant), an unofficial nickname of SARS-CoV-2 Omicron variant EG.5
- Eriş, a Turkish name

== People with the given name ==
- Eris Abedini (born 1998), Swiss professional footballer
- Eris Baker (born 2005), American child actress
- Eris Loris, American hacker
- Eris O'Brien (1895–1974), Australian prelate of the Catholic Church and historian
- Eris Paton (1928–2004), New Zealand cricketer
- Eris Tafaj (born 1980), Albanian footballer and coach

== See also ==
- Aeris (disambiguation)
- EFnet or Eris-Free network, an Internet Relay Chat (IRC) network
