= Eridanosaurus =

Scientific classification
- Kingdom: Animalia
- Phylum: Chordata
- Class: Mammalia
- Infraclass: Placentalia
- Order: Perissodactyla
- Family: Rhinocerotidae
- Genus: †Eridanosaurus; Balsamo-Crivelli, 1864
- Species: †E. brambillae

Binomial name
- †Eridanosaurus brambillae Balsamo-Crivelli, 1864

Genus of mammals

Eridanosaurus is an extinct genus originally described as a crocodilian, but later shown to be a rhinoceros (specifically, based on a rhinoceros vertebra). It is known from Italy.
