= Eri =

Eri may refer to:

== People ==
- Eri (biblical figure)
- Eri (given name), a Japanese feminine given name, including lists of people and fictional characters
- Eri (king), the progenitor of the Umu-Eri and Umu-Nri-Igbo ancient Nigerian city-states
- Arfiya Eri (born 1988), Japanese politician
- Chiemi Eri (1937–1982), Japanese singer and actress
- Vincent Eri (1936–1993), Governor General of Papua New Guinea

== Other uses ==
- Eri silk, a type of silk
- Eri-TV, an Eritrean television network
- Earthquake Research Institute, University of Tokyo
- Edinburgh Royal Infirmary, a hospital in Edinburgh, Scotland
- Eldorado Resorts, an American gaming company
- Electrical resistivity imaging
- Empowerment and Rights Institute, a Chinese human rights organization
- Energy and Resources Institute, an Indian research institute
- Eridanus
- Erie International Airport in Pennsylvania, United States
- Eritrea
- Eri, the collar of a kimono
- EarthRights International, an American nonprofit human rights organization
- Eri, political party in Georgia

== See also ==
- Ériu, in Irish mythology, one of the patron goddesses of Ireland
- 英利 (disambiguation)
