= Ares (disambiguation) =

Ares is the Greek god of war and violence, equivalent of the Roman god Mars.

Ares or ARES may also refer to:

== Technology ==
- Ares (rocket), various proposed and existing launch vehicles and missiles
- Aerial Reconfigurable Embedded System, a DARPA concept for a robotic VTOL vehicle
- Aerial Regional-scale Environmental Survey, a robotic spacecraft proposed to fly in the Martian atmosphere
- Atmospheric Reentry Experimental Spaceplane, a French spaceplane concept from 2009
- Augmented Reality Sandtable, an interactive digital sand table used by the U.S. military for soldier training
- Scaled Composites ARES, a demonstrator aircraft built by the company Scaled Composites
- Advanced Rail Energy Storage, a new energy storage system utilizing gravitational potential energy
- ares, a multi-system video game console emulator derived from higan
- Ares, an Armoured Personnel Carrier variant of the General Dynamics Ajax being developed for the British Army
- ARES, a component of Proteus Design Suite
- Amateur Radio Emergency Service, a corps of volunteer emergency radio operators

== Arts and entertainment ==
=== Film ===
- Ares (film), a 2016 French dystopian film
- Ares, a film project developed by American director Robert Zemeckis
- Tron: Ares, a 2025 American science fiction action film

=== Literature ===
==== Fantasy fiction ====
- Ares (comic book), a 2006 Marvel Comics comic book series
- Ares (DC Comics), the Greek god as he appears in DC Comics
- Ares (manhwa), a Korean comic about a group of mercenaries
- Ares (Marvel Comics), the Greek god as he appears in Marvel Comics
- Ares, a bat in The Underland Chronicles

==== Science fiction ====
- Ares (magazine), a science fiction wargame magazine
- Ares, a large interplanetary spacecraft in the novel Red Mars in the Mars trilogy series
- Ares, a NASA spaceflight program in the 2011 novel The Martian and the film adaptation

=== Music ===
- Ares (Salt the Wound album), 2009
- Ares (Arcángel album), 2018
- Ares, a 2008 song from Intimacy by Bloc Party
- "Ares", a 2018 song by KSI

=== Sculpture ===
- Ares Borghese, a Roman marble sculpture
- Ludovisi Ares, a Roman marble sculpture

=== Television ===
- Ares (Hercules and Xena), the Greek god as portrayed on the series Hercules: The Legendary Journeys and Xena: Warrior Princess
- "Ares" (Hercules: The Legendary Journeys), an episode of Hercules: The Legendary Journeys
- Ares (TV series), a Dutch Netflix original series
- Ares IV, a spacecraft in the Star Trek: Voyager episode "One Small Step"
- Tekfur Ares, a character in the Turkish TV series Diriliş: Ertuğrul

=== Video games ===
- Ares (video game)
- A.R.E.S.: Extinction Agenda, side-scrolling action platform game

== People ==
- Ares (musician), Norwegian extreme metal musician
- Ares (wrestler), professional wrestler
- Ares Schwager, the nickname/stagename of the American musician and guitarist Brian Schwager
- Ares Tavolazzi, Italian bass player and jazz musician
- Donna Ares, the stage name of Bosniak folk singer Azra Kolaković
- Malcom Adu Ares, Spanish footballer
- Natalia Ares, Argentine physicist
- Richard Arès, French Canadian humanist and writer
- Ares or Aris Velouchiotis, nom de guerre of Athanasios Klaras (1905-1945), leader of the Greek resistance during World War II

== Places ==
=== Earth ===
- Arès, a town at the north of Arcachon Bay in France
- Arês, Rio Grande do Norte, a municipality in Brazil
- Ares, Spain, a municipality
- Ares Cliff, on the east side of Alexander Island in Antarctica
- Ares del Maestrat, a town in Alt Maestrat, Spain
- Col d'Ares, a Pyrenees mountain pass on the border between France and Spain
- Col des Ares, a mountain pass in Haute-Garonne in southwest France
- Muela de Ares, a mountain in the province of Castellón, Spain
- "Rock of Ares", a rock outcropping site in Greece known as the Areopagus

=== Mars ===
- Ares Vallis, an outflow channel in the Oxia Palus quadrangle on Mars
- Aerial Regional-scale Environmental Survey, a proposed Mars aircraft

== Other uses ==
- L'Alliance républicaine, écologique et sociale, a French coalition of parties
- ARES Incorporated, a firearm and weapon system manufacturer
- Ares Management, a global alternative asset manager
- Aciéries Rodange Esch-Schifflange, a Luxembourgish company formed in 1994 from ARBED-Esch Schifflange and Minière et Métallurgique de Rodange
- Armament Research Services, a consultancy company in the field of arms and munitions
- Ares, plural of are, a unit of area (=100 m^{2})

== See also ==
- Ares in popular culture
- AIRES
- Aries (disambiguation)
- Aris (disambiguation)
- Mars (disambiguation)
