= Ares (comics) =

Ares, in comics, may refer to:

- Ares (DC Comics), a DC Comics character and enemy of Wonder Woman
- Ares (Marvel Comics), a Marvel Comics character who started as a villain
  - Ares (comic book), a 2006 Marvel Comics comic book mini-series
- Ares (Hercules: The Legendary Journeys and Xena: Warrior Princess), a character from the television show and comics
- Ares (manhwa), a Korean comic series about a group of mercenaries

== See also ==
- Ares (disambiguation)
- Aries (character), a similarly spelled Marvel Comics villain, members of the Zodiac
- Children of Ares (comics), DC Comics characters
