= Nephilim (manhwa) =

Korean manhwa

네피림존 RR: Nepirimjon MR: Nep'irimjon
- Genre: Action/adventure
- Author: Ryu Kum-chel
- Publisher: (South Korea) Daewon C.I.
- Magazine: (South Korea) Super Champ
- Original run: 2007–May 2010
- Collected volumes: 8

Nephilim is a Korean manhwa written and illustrated by Ryu Kum-chel, author of Ares. The story focuses on a boy, John, who is possessed by an angel, Michael.

== Setting ==
Nephilim takes place in a world where angels and demons (fallen angels) are constantly at war with one another. When demons appeared, they attacked and harassed humans. In return, the angels came down from Heaven to defend the humans. To back up their forces and continue the fight on earth when they fought in Heaven, the angels and demons granted certain humans abilities to fight in their stead. These humans became the Heavenly Knights Corps and Darkness Knights Corps. While the Knights of Heaven only consist of exceptional individuals, the Knights of Darkness accept just about anyone, which is why the Darkness Knights Corps vastly outnumbers the Heavenly Knights Corps.

One other group exists along with the angels and demons- the nephilim. The nephilim are the offspring of angels and humans. Both the parents and the children are hunted vigorously by the angels. The human parents and the nephilim children are killed, while the angel parents are captured to be reeducated.

The angels, demons, knights, and nephilim fight by summoning weapons known as "Apoca". Apocas normally take the form of innocuous pieces of jewelry on the bodies of the fighters, and can be summoned as weapons at any time. The strength of the Apoca depends on the strength of the owner and the amount of ether (a form of energy) sent into it.

== Plot ==
The story begins when John, a slave for nobility, is attacked by ruffians. About to be killed, John is saved when Michael, an angel, falls from the sky after fighting demons. Michael forms a bond with John, lending him his strength so that they both can survive. Now on the run from angels, demons, and knights, John must learn from Michael how to harness his new power. Even while fleeing, John finds himself drawn into the most recent clash between the angels and demons, the 6th Armageddon.

== Characters ==
John
The protagonist, John has been a slave for the nobility of Bisque since childhood. Although he is a nephilim, John did not know until after his possession by Michael because his wings were cut off when he was little. Now possessed by Michael, John has access to Michael's Apoca, Giselle, and great strength. Michael can take control of John's body to fight, but this slows his movements, which is why Michael continues to train John to fight on his own.

=== Angels ===
Michael
One of the most powerful angels in Heaven, Michael distinguished himself in the 5th Armageddon. When he was a young angel, Michael spent some time as a member of the Grigori unit with Lucifer before his fall. The Grigori Persecution Unit is responsible for hunting down nephilim and grigori, those angels who have fallen in love with humans and spawned nephilim. Now Michael resides in John, appearing only to him, lending him strength, and sometimes taking control of his body. Michael's Apoca is named Giselle, and is known to be particularly difficult to control.

=== Heavenly Knights Corps ===
Micky
A powerful member of the Heavenly Knights Corps. He is a myth among the Knights of Darkness because he is so brutal and he has passed up promotion just so he can continue to kill demons and members of the Knights of Darkness. He also bears a resemblance to someone Michael knew 400 years ago, Mateo, although Mateo is dead. The resemblance even extends to his Apoca, which is the same as Mateo's. His Apoca is a large single-edged sword with leather straps that wrap around his hand and part of his arm.

=== Demons ===
Lucifer
Once an angel of the Grigori unit alongside Michael, Lucifer became disillusioned and fell to become a great demon leader.
Beelzebub
The first angel to rebel, Beelzebub was unwilling to serve humans after God created them. His rebellion began the millennia-long war between angels and demons. Now he is the leader of the demons.
Samuel
A powerful demon under Lucifer, Samuel likes to fight as dirty as possible. At one point he possesses Emily, a young girl who has befriended John, and forces him to fight her. Samuel also seems to be the only demon with the ability to raise the dead as his puppets, as shown when he kills two Heavenly Knights and uses their reanimated corpses to fight John.

=== Darkness Knights Corps ===
Severus
While he was once a member of the Heavenly Knights Corps and Micky's best friend, Severus joined the Darkness Knights Corps so that Samuel would resurrect Micky's girlfriend and Severus' love, Maria. Severus was an orphan, but he was raised by the Heavenly Knights Corps in one of their fortresses and thus knows how the Heavenly Knights Corps works.
Nexon
A member of the Knights of Darkness, Nexon used to be a bodyguard for Isabel. Even before he knew of John's status as a nephilim, Nexon would berate and abuse him for fun.

=== Nephilim ===
Rocky/Loki
A nephilim whose power greatly outmatches John's. While Rocky does not tend to start fights, he will kill anyone who attacks him. When Isabel flees from attackers after Bisque is invaded by the Onneice Tribe, Rocky protects her. Rocky has wings that allow him to fly, unlike John whose wings were cut off.
Sandalphon
A powerful nephilim who terrorized the entire universe hundreds of thousands of years ago. He may be the reason angels despise nephilims to the extent of mass murder.

=== Humans ===
Isabel
The princess of the nation of Bisque. Isabel chose John to be her family's slave when she saw him in the discount area at a slave auction looking pitiful. Because of this and her caring personality, John is devoted to her.
Emily
A young girl in a small town harassed by demons who befriends John. Because Emily's parents are killed by demons, she accidentally opens her heart to Samuel, a powerful demon, and is possessed. Micky, who is also present, ends up killing her, although Samuel manages to leave her body before the attack is finished, leaving him only wounded. After Emily's death, John takes her hat and wears it in her memory and as a sign of his decision to never purposefully allow another innocent to die as collateral damage in the war against demons.
