= Terminal countdown demonstration test =

Simulation of launch countdown

A terminal countdown demonstration test (TCDT) is a simulation of the final hours of a launch countdown and serves as a practice exercise in which both the launch team and flight crew rehearse launch day timelines and procedures. In the specific case of a TCDT for the Space Shuttle, the test culminated in a simulated ignition and RSLS Abort (automated shutdown of the orbiter's main engines). Following the simulated abort, the flight crew was briefed on emergency egress procedures and use of the fixed service structure slidewire system. On some earlier shuttle missions, and Apollo missions, the test would conclude with the flight crew evacuating the launch pad by use of these emergency systems, but this is no longer part of the test.

Unmanned carrier rocket launches also undergo TCDTs, when countdown procedures are followed. These vary for specific rockets, for example solid-fuelled rockets would not simulate an engine shutdown, as it is impossible to shut down a solid-fuelled rocket after it has been lit.

TCDTs typically are carried out a few days before launch.

== See also ==
- Space Shuttle program
- Ares (rocket)
