= List of Ares (manhwa) chapters =

There are 26 volumes for the manhwa, Vagrant Soldier Ares.

== Volume 01 ==
The first volume contains nine chapters.

Chapter	Summary
001	Despite the frequency of war, the country of Chronos has had relative peace for 10 years. In the Chronos year 237, Ares finds an advertisement for Temple Mercenaries. He's broke, homeless and hungry, and their offer of room and board appeals. He first tries his luck for a meal at a nearby shop but is thrown out. Mikael Graccio finds the same ad and takes a meal at the same shop. The waitress also takes pity on Ares and sneaks him a bowl of food. She warns him against the dangerous choice of joining Temple Mercenaries, telling him how men from her village never return alive. When she asks if he is any good at fighting, he replies, "I'm as good as the next guy." Later he hears a scream and realizes it is her. He returns to find three thugs demanding "rent" from her father, the owner. They decide to take her instead, and Ares intervenes to return her earlier kindness. They laugh, and the leader says that he got his facial scar from defeating the Red-Eyed Swordsman. After offering them a chance to back down, Ares quickly takes out two of the three. The leader then holds a knife go to the waitress. Mikael, who had been observing Ares, casually dispatches the leader as swiftly as Ares defeated the other two.
002	Ares and Mikael proceed to Temple Mercenaries. Two guards at the gate belittle them for their youth. They also mock Ares because he did not know there was an entrance exam - a test of skill against a B-Rank soldier. Mikael threatens the guards and beats one of them. Inside the gate, they find the testing grounds and join the queue. The next entrant up is Baroona. He hesitates to fight with a practice sword, but Temple will not allow him to use his preferred weapon of twin chained daggers. He lasts the three-minute minimum by easily evading attack, and Mikael and the tester both realize he never intended to attack in the first place. Testers are switched out, and the new one harshly speaks against all those who came to the entrance exam. When Mikael's turn comes up, he asks to use a real sword and is denied. When asked for his name, Mikael refuses to give it.
003	Mikael takes out the tester immediately. He hands the practice sword to Ares, telling him, "I'll be waiting, so you'd better come!" Angered for the pride of Temple, the new tester fights dirty. He attacks while Ares tends to an untied shoelace. He hits Ares solidly on the head, but Ares has a very hard head. When the tester attempts a second simple tactic on the somewhat simple-minded Ares, Ares feints and easily dodges with an acrobatic maneuver. The tester throws sand at Ares' eyes, but Ares catches it. Ares throws the sword at the tester and then throws back the sand he'd caught. It turns into a brawl, and Ares wins. The three join Temple Mercenaries as C-Rank soldiers.
004	In the Chronos village of Jagsen, young Mickey cries in front of the graves of his parents. They died when bandits looted the village. The bandits return monthly, demanding a protection fee. Even though Chronos ignored the village's pleas for help, Mickey hates that the villagers pay it. This month, however, the village elder decided to give the protection money to Temple Mercenaries instead. Ares, Mikael, and Baroona sleep while traveling to Jagsen, and their unit's fourth, Gohue, can not believe that they are so unafraid of their first mission. When they arrive, Mickey is impressed by Temple Mercenaries but not by the four. Ares tries to end Mickey's heckling by demonstrating his sword skill to slice a scrap of wood into quarters mid-air with his eyes closed.
005	The wood scrap lands seemingly intact, and Mickey runs off. Meanwhile, the head bandit Shion decides to double the monthly protection monies charged to the village. An underling arrives to tell him that an army has appeared, but Shion laughs, saying he was once in the army himself. Later that night while Mickey walks home, he finds the wood scrap that Ares tried his skill at earlier. He kicks it, and it flies apart in four pieces. Mickey seeks out Ares, who is watching Gohue draw. He apologizes to Ares and is momentarily impressed by Ares' regard until Ares runs off to gamble. When the bandits arrive in the morning, the villagers have a tarp over their "payment" - Temple Mercenaries including Ares, Mikael, and Baroona.
006	When the bandits remove the tarp, the villagers shy and the mercenaries immediately attack. Baroona notes that Ares is doing quite well. Mickey, watching from a window, announces to the cowering villagers that Temple Mercenaries have already won the fight. Ares finds and kicks Gohue who had been playing dead, claiming to have fainted. The sole remaining bandit attempts to flee, but the mercenaries order him to lead them to their base. At their watchtower, the bandits spy Temple Mercenaries approaching.
007	Shion calms the bandits and asks what army the approaching soldiers represent. The watchman replies that they do not have a flag, but their helmuts have a snake symbol. One of Shion's men, Carnival, identifies them as Temple Mercenaries, a previous employer of his. He says that they "used to be strong, but probably they are now all garbage". Temple Mercenaries sends scouts and A-Rank soldiers to the front and more soldiers towards the back of the bandit, a strategy that Mikael explains to an impressed Mikael. One-Armed Jack and other A-Rank soldiers break through the bandits' preliminary defense, but the bandits retreat beyond their gate. The bandits heckle Temple Mercenaries saying, their other troops that went towards the back are probably dead. Carnival has single-handedly dispatched them. When asked by his fellow bandits if he had a grudge against Temple Mercenaries, Carnival replies that "these bastards kicked me out".
008	The C-Rank soldiers are assigned to break down the doors, and they encounter a small group of bandits waiting for them inside. Five A-Rank soldiers move forward to dispatch them. They immediately recognize Carnival, and Carnival immediately kills them. Older soldiers relate to the new recruits how Carnival was kicked out of Temple Mercenaries two years ago while a beginning rain reminds Shion of another rainy day when he was a general for Chronos. On that day he remembers that the king turned down his request for remuneration to his soldiers after they had suffered exceptional losses during a hard conflict. Meanwhile, Mikael out-maneuvers Ares for the chance to fight Carnival. Carnival asks if he is crazy, and Mikael replies, "Well, I don't much want to live..."
009	Before Mikael can begin, One-Armed Jack steps in to fight Carnival. Mikael knocks Ares out of his helmet for saying that Mikael was cut off from fighting Carnival like Mikael cut Ares off. Baroona asks why he hurt his hand on Ares' helmet, but Mikael admits that Ares ducked a blow to the head. As One-Armed Jack skillfully fights Carnival, the latter is forced to draw his second sword.

== Volume 02 ==
The second volume contains nine chapters.

Chapter	Summary
010	Carnival decides to fight One-Armed Jack seriously while the Temple Mercenaries squad leader realizes the importance of his win for his soldiers' morale. The older soldiers disregard Ares, Mikael and Baroona, and Mikael also senses that One-Armed Jack may lose and brings the trio together: Mikael will take Carnival, and Ares and Baroona will go after the boss. Despite good effort and ability, One-Armed Jack tires against Carnival's two-sword techniques. The three prepare to intervene.
011	Carnival moves in for the killing blow, but Mikael quickly blocks with his sword before the older soldiers can move. They and Carnival are noticeably impressed. Ares and Baroona charge past the two towards the remaining men behind Carnival. Ares unbalances the much larger Underboss Pig, kicks him upwards and catches him on his sword on his descent but is trapped under the enemy's bulk. Baroona wraps his chain around another. Meanwhile, Mikael suggests to Carnival that they ignore the others and focus on their own fight. Carnival asks if they three are really C-Rank versus those A-Rank "insects", and Mikael concurs. Mikael wonders why the squad leader has yet to do anything. He suggests to him that the others attack the bandits' boss while he fights Carnival and Ares and Baroona fight Carnival's companions.
012	Shion realizes that Carnival has not returned yet and calls for his own sword, the massive Ionix. The remaining Temple Mercenaries appear in Shion's doorway. Baroona sees that he will finish his own fight soon and asks Mikael if he is done, but Mikael says he will be a while in the fight with Carnival. Ares frees himself before Baroona can help. Mikael shrugs off help from both of them, saying to stay out of his claimed fight. Ares says to him, "If you die, we're not going to bury you, so you better come back alive!" The storm worsens as Ares and Baroona leave to find the bandits' boss and Mikael and Carnival face off again.
013	Mikael and Carnival continue their fight. When Mikael blinks away blood, Carnival attacks. He manages to clip the leaf blade Mikael always holds in his mouth. Mikael disregards his own sword to punch Carnival backwards a considerable distance. Mikael wants to know why Carnival is only attacking his face. He throws his helmet at Carnival as a feint. While Carnival slices it in half, Mikael is behind it with his sword and cuts him. Carnival dodges another strong attack from Mikael's sword, and its tip embeds in the wall behind Carnival. As he frees it, Carnival attacks again with a kick smartly aimed to damage an artery. Mikael asks why such a skilled fighter as Carnival stays in a remote locale when Temple Mercenaries would have let him see more of the world. Carnival replies that his boss is a strong man and a good guy. When Carnival and Shion met, they fought for hours and inconclusively. Shion revealed to him that he had deserted his position as a Chronos general to join a rebellion and asked Carnival to be his right-hand man. It was a good offer to Carnival who had nowhere to go. Mikael recognizes Shion's name as the general most responsible for Chronos' earlier victory against the Radnik Alliance.
014	The Temple Mercenaries are hard pressed by the bandits. Shion takes on the squad leader and "tests" him for aggressiveness, agility and endurance. Shion eliminates him without unsheathing his sword. As Ares and Baroona approach, they meet another strong bandit fighter. Baroona offers him firsts to Ares, but Ares declines in favor of going after the boss. Ares realizes he is unaware who is the boss or his identity, so he asks Shion. Shion points out Ares as he approaches them.
015	Still sheathed, Shion swings his massive, still-sheathed sword at Ares, but Ares dodges then lands on the sword, using its momentum to launch himself onto a chandelier. Ares cuts free its support to land atop a confusion of bandits. He counters Shions quick, following attack. Shion says that Ares has passed the "test" and asks his name. Shion exclaims, "The God of War's name!" and unsheathes his sword. Shion's men comment that Shion has rarely done that and only to fight with other generals. Ares wrongly assumes that Shion's over-large sword will allow many openings, but Shion maneuvers it easily. Ares' sword breaks against it, but he replies that "You can still kill a person with a broken sword!!" Ares and Shion trade blows. Ares picks up a sword from a fallen soldier and continues the fight. He takes a beating and thinks back on the Red-Eyed Swordsman and that it is not time to join his master yet.
016	Shion breaks Ares' found sword, but Ares manages to cut him. Ares finds an axe. Baroona has tied up another of Shion's strong fighters with the cord linking his daggers. The caught man calls it cheating, but Baroona replies that it's not a match but a real battle. When the man cannot free himself with his own blade against the cord, Baroona admits that it is made of steel. Meanwhile, Mikael has broken one of Carnival's swords. He says to Carnival, "If there's a guy stronger than your boss, would you work for him?" Mikael offers that his name is fully "Mikael Graccio", Carnival offers to write it on his tombstone. Mikael wins on the final strike. He tells Carnival that he missed his heart on purpose and that he will hide Carnivale's body, so that he can freely decide later. He says that he wants Carnival to fight on a bigger stage. Outside in the rain, the villagers have come across the bodies of fallen soldiers as they make their way to help the mercenaries.
017	Both the Temple Mercenaries and the bandits have suffered heavy casualties. Temple Mercenaries signals to regroup. Shion asks Ares to join him as a subleader to help rebuild the corrupted Chronos. Ares turns him down because he says his chances of defeating him are increasing as he has already slowed Shion with a wound to his shoulder. Ares has another sword, and they continue to fight. Someone approaches. The bandits assume it is Carnival, but it is Mikael. Mikael assesses the situation and realizes that the sword Ares is using will fail him and that his own will do no better. Shion pins Ares to the wall when he catches Ares' clothes with Ionix. Mikael's knowing eye spies the weapon of their fallen squad leader. Ares has caught several punches, and his vision spins when he dodges another blow to the head. He recognizes that Mikael is offering him a sword. Mikael believes that Ares is unaware the fight us with a fading yet great hero. Ares catches the sword, breaks free from the wall, leaps and catches Shion's sword on the landing. The new sword breaks Shion's sword.
018	Shion has fallen, and Mikael asks Ares why he has yet to finish him off. Ares asks Shion if he has any last words. Shion asks Ares if he knows how heroes are born. He says that a hero rises up without even knowing it himself and that heroes are born not made. He says that Ares is that hero. Ares thinks nothing of it, and Shion makes a last request to spare the lives of his men who are all ex-soldiers. He says they turned out the way they have because they met the wrong leader. Ares agrees to his request, and Shion tells Ares to finish him. Mickey arrives in time to witness this act. Shion's men move to avenge their boss, but Mikael stops them, and Ares stops Mikael from further fighting - to keep the promise he made Shion. When the bandaged Ares finds Gohue as they are leaving, Gohue says that Ares was unaware the fight was not with the real boss who was in the supply room. Ares comments that it is much less cramped on the journey back and is told that they lost half their forces. Mickey arrives to send them off, saying he will join Temple Mercenaries, too, when he grows up.

== Volume 03 ==
The third volume contains six chapters.

Chapter	Summary
019	The king of Chronos begins to lose control of his country. His people talk of rebellion and other nations consider a coup. The island nation of Minos has launched several raids on Chronos' northern shore, but the government had not responded. Then the young general Icarus arrived at Temple Mercenaries to hire a single regiment of soldiers. Temple Mercenaries offered strategy based on their intelligence, but Icarus would not be swayed from his undisclosed plans. Ares' unit, the 4th Infantry, was dispatched to Lord Gizelle in the port city of Nix. In Nix, Lord Gizelle's daughter Ariadne chafed under her restricted freedoms and her bodyguard Helena tried to restrain her. The two venture down to street level, and she and Ares catch each other's glance in passing.
020	After meeting Ariadne, Ares decides to join his unit in the showers. He notices that Baroona has a tattoo on his back, but Baroona refuses to explain its nature. The more worldly Mikael recognizes it as the mark of a Daraakian slave but says nothing. While walking about the city afterwards, local militia hassle the group. With the notoriety gained from his defeat of Carnival, Mikael asks Temple Mercenaries' higher-ups to approve retaliation. Mikael baits the locals into making a first move while in the soldiers' common mess hall. One-Eyed Jack and the rest of the mercenaries retaliate when Mikael takes the first punch and reacts in "self-defense". Ariadne and Helena are walking near the mess hall when one of the locals is thrown through its doors into the street. The local draws his sword, and Mikael does the same. Helena insists that both soldiers stand down. The local stops, recognizing her as Ariadne's bodyguard and the city's best fighter. Mikael is slower to back down, and Helena takes that as a challenge. She spars with Mikael, but he stops her. She threatens to draw her sword, and he does not back down from that. At that moment, Ares is thrown through a window into the street. Ariadne recognizes Ares from before and invites him for tea.
021	The king gives Icarus free rein to act against Minos, telling him not bother him with trivial matters while his concubines await him. He tells Icarus that Antonis "does his job well as Admiral without direction". He threatens to behead Icarus, but Antonis stops him. After returning to his troops, Icarus' right-hand man, Genasis, realizes his general's distress over the king's insanity. Both know that Isiris, the Radnik Alliance and even their ally Silonica are gathering military strength while Chronos is getting weaker. That is why even the small nation of Minos has dared attack their shore. Genasis asks if maybe a rebellion might be a good idea, and that he would follow him. Icarus demurs that it is not yet the right time. Instead he rallies his troop against Minos. Meanwhile, Ares obsesses that Ariadne has not contacted him for tea. Mikael, Baroona and Gohue take him to her estate. After entering the grounds, Mikael says that to lay his life on the line for love is against the life of soldier and leaves them to it. Baroona and Gohue gain access to the house and are challenged by Helena.
022	A BIRD IN THE BIRDCAGE. Helena pursues Baroona and Gohue, and Ares comes out of hiding to talk to Ariadne. He hands her flowers, and they have coffee. Instead of confessing his heart, she asks him the questions her father and Helena avoided answering. She asks about the presence of the mercenaries, and Ares candidly replies with the classified information that they will retaliate against Minos soon. She asks if fighting is fun, and Ares replies, "Of course it is!" He says that battle makes him feel alive. Ariadne bemoans her life as a caged bird. He remembers life as an apprentice. He fought for the first time at the age of eight against a challenger to his master. Ares realizes how far apart their worlds are and tells her not worry about her restricted, sheltered life. He tells her they'll be friends. Realizing the ruse, Helena arrives to beat up Ares. Icarus arrives with two legions and gathers everyone for a ceremony. Each soldier lets a little blood to paint their face and ward the god of death. Ares catches scent of Ariadne's perfume and waves to her, but Helena threatens him. Chronos' ally Silonica arrives with a strong force that includes the young general Rikion and his battle-experienced grandfather. Icarus comments to Genasis that Silonica is their ally, but that they will be watching to gauge the strength and resolve of Chronos. The battle's outcome is doubly important. Ares throws a letter weighted with a rock into Ariadne's room, telling her they will depart in the morning and that he will bring her back souvenirs. Simple-minded in a way similar to Ares, the innocent Ariadne decides to stow away to join the "fun".
023	WHAT'S YOUR NAME? MY NAME IS ARES! Helena finds that Ariadne and her body guard gear have gone missing. Helena makes it to the harbor in time to land on the last departing ship. Helena knows very well the brutality of war, and she promises herself to beat up Ares again after she finds Ariadne. Rikion dines with Icarus and goads him with familiarity. Rikion's grandfather and Genasis rile, but Icarus ignores it. Rikion's grandfather decides that Icarus is a fool or an extremely dangerous man. Rikion apologizes and asks if he might inspect Chronos' men. Icarus replies that he can do as he wants, and Rikion leaps aboard the ship that happens to be carrying the Temple Mercenaries. On board, Ares swears he smells Ariadne's perfume. Rikion arrives and feints toward Mikael who appears to sleep against a mast. Mikael ignores him, and Baroona intercepts Rikion's second attempt at Mikael. Rikion demands his name, but Mikael says he's not beholden to Silonica's chain of command. Temple Mercenaries' soldiers rile against Rikion, and he backs down for political reasons. Icarus sends message to one of his proxies to divert course from the main force towards an outpost southeast of Minos on the small island of Shardena. There is a watchtower there, and they are to take it.
024	Dummy fleets set sail towards the southwestern tip of Minos and its city of Jellin. The proxy who invaded Shardena was also successful, and no warning watchfire will light from that tower. However, Jellin lit their signal fire, and Minos' forces gather to fight Chronos. They attack the ships and find them empty. Suddenly Shardena's signal fire lights, and Minos diverts the No-Name Knights towards that coast. Ares again smells Ariadne's perfume, and Ariadne sees his unit's flag which matches the shirt he wears. She catches sight of Helena and runs from her into a large soldier. He threatens to beat her, but she says that she is Ares' girl. And Ares arrives and takes the hit intended for her. He had gone looking for her in case he was mistaken about the perfume. Sunbae stops them joining the relative safety of Ares' unit, but Baroona threatens Sunbae. Temple Mercenaries and Chronos' main force and Silonica's troops head inland to Minos' capital, on an intersect course with the No-Name Knights.

== Volume 04 ==
The fourth volume contains six chapters.

Chapter	Summary
025	The Temple Mercenaries and the Chronosian and Silionican ambush the No-Name Knights in a forest, while Ares leads Ariadne farther and farther away from the battle so she doesn't see all the killing and brutality of the battle. She calls him a coward, and moves to go back to the battle. In order to stop her, Ares deliberately smashes his leg into a tree and pretends that he is seriously hurt, and that he needs her to stay and nurse him. The captain of the No-Name Knights breaks through the Chronosian forces. He appears to be untouchable because of his extreme speed, but Rikion catches up with him. The captain fights one on one with Rikion, and gets tangled in Rikion's weapon within a few seconds. Rikion wants to remove the Captain's mask so that before killing him he can see his face. A captain's subordinate gallops towards them, determined to save his leader, but Rikion with his lance jumps up into the air killing the captain. Then Rikion the subordinate. Rikion finds that he is unable to untangle his weapon and has to resort to cutting off the dead captain's arm.
026	About an hour later, most of the No-Name Knights are dead, and the rest ran away. The Mercenaries are checking to see if all the knights are dead, and no-one is hiding among the corpses. Baroona comes upon a survivor, but only pretends to kill him, missing his head by inches. Further down from them, Mikael also spots a survivor, and kills him. Afterwards, Rikion attempts to tease Mikael by throwing the captain's arm at him and telling him his arm could turn out like that, Mikael blatantly ignores him. The Commander of the No-Name Knights is captured by Icarus´ soldiers, but escapes by telling them to let him go so he can kill himself, then runs the second he is released. Icarus does not follow.
027	The Chronosian army and also the Temple Mercenaries are marching on Karil, the capital city of Minos. Ariadne came with Ares to the battle. Icarus believes that the soldiers cannot defeat the Minos' Kentaro Legion leader, since they lost Genasis. However, their former leader was General Sion, who Ares had defeated earlier on, and thus believes that there are no good warriors. The soldiers gathered at the battle are soon surprised by the new general, Kentaro (he catches and eats an arrow). He quickly defeats two generals before Icarus send out Rikion to decapitate him; Mikael steps out first, however, and challenges Kentaro.
028	At first, all the soldiers and Kentaro are condescending of Mikael's challenge. However, Ares has confidence in Mikael, even though he appears to be losing in the early stages of the battle. Utilizing his agility and battle tactics, he succeeds in getting close to his enemy and biting Kentaro's neck. Blood sprays everywhere and both sides of the battle are stunned when Kentaro falls to the ground, dead. Mikael draws a dagger and decapitates him, proceeds to throw the head at Icarus' feet, and then ask for a reward. Icarus offers to promote him and serve as a general but is refused. At the end, Helena has arrived at the scene and, noticing Mikael, realizes that Ares and Ariadne must also be down there.
029	The Temple Mercenaries start catapulting rocks into Minos, followed by sending foot soldiers into the city. Helena has found Ares and Ariadne, so Ares grabs Ariadne and begins to run away. Baroona warns Ares of the danger in doing so, but Ares ends up in the front lines anyway. Mikael and Baroona are ordered to kidnap the Minos King. Meanwhile, Ariadne is scared and the Minos gate has almost been broken through. So, with Ariadne on his back, Ares makes his way up the Minos gate wall and escapes from Helena and the front lines. The soldiers watching are in total awe and amazement; they are inspired to be the first up the wall and into Minos.
030	Ares' main concern is to keep Ariadne safe and innocent, so he avoids fighting in front of her. However, when he has no choice but a violent defense, Ariadne believes that he is amazing. Ares is shot in the left shoulder soon afterward, but he jumps off the Minos gate wall with Ariadne in his arms. The rope he is holding is cut. Meanwhile, the No Name knights are ushered within the gates with the Temple Mercenaries at their heels. But the No Name knights are really disguised mercenaries, so the mercenaries pour into Minos through the open gate. At this time, the Minos king decides to run away through a secret passageway. Gohue, Baroona, and Mikael are going after the king, but they are immediately confronted by the 40 Royal Guards as soon as they enter the secret passage. Gohue punches the floor and unwittingly opens another secret pass. Baroona and Mikael send Gohue along the pass to bring reinforcements. After he leaves, Mikael questions Baroona about tattoo on the back of the Daraakian slave. Baroona acknowledges the fact that he is a Daarakian slave, a gladiator; the last champion. The chapter leaves off with the two facing forty ...

== Volume 05 ==
The fifth volume contains six chapters.

Chapter	Summary
031	The Royal Guards are belittling Baroona and Mikael, but although the pair are severely outnumbered, the quickly wipe out a good many Minos soldiers. The leader is named Master Bellisk; Baroona and Mikael soon find out that he is extremely powerful, even more so than Kentaro (who Mikael had previously fought). Bellisk is the master swordsman of Minos, so the Royal Guards are extremely confident in their success and scorn Baroona and Mikael when they compare themselves to the master.
032	Since Baroona and Mikael plan to annihilate Bellisk first, the Royal Guards all pretend to be the master; they're all dressed similarly, making the task nearly impossible. However, Gohue arrives back along the secret pass, startling everyone in the vicinity. He comes without reinforcements; he merely came back for a light because the pass was too dark. Gohue runs off again. When the pair turn back to Bellisk, they find that he is cocky and confident, and Mikael threatens that it will be the day he buries Bellisk and his name. Meanwhile, the Temple Mercenaries have taken over Karil (capital of Minos), and it is a total victory for Chronos. A soldier reports to Icarus that three of their soldiers are trapped in the secret passageway and Rikion notes that it is most likely that the kind has escaped and the three soldiers are dead. On the other hand, Ares and Ariadne have escaped out of Minos. Ariadne has bandaged Ares' wounded arm and has gone to make him some food.
033	While Ariadne is cooking for him, Ares dreams about his wonderful future life with her and their child. However, Helena is outside the kitchen window watching Ariadne. She sees the basement door creak open and watches as a bunch of people climb out, hands full of stolen loot, and threaten to sell Ariadne as a slave in Daraak. The notice Helena outside the window and try to subdue her. They begin to manhandle Ariadne, so Helena gets reckless and sustains some injuries. Soon, they are both tied up against the wall. One of the people taste Ariadne's cooking, promptly spitting it out; another person is shocked that he did not feel Ares' presence in the house. Ares appears on the scene, Emergency Food propped up on his head. He is oblivious to the danger of the situation and acts casual and lazy, even tasting Ariadne's cooking (which he pretends to like but then feigning he has to stop. The person who can feel people's presence is shaking uncontrollably, signifying Ares' terrible strength. It turns out that the group of people are Minos' Nebuchar Assassination Squad. They were going to kill Icarus, but saw that the situation was futile, so decided to run away to Daraak. Ares is mildly impressed, but his main concern is that saving Helena and Ariadne will cause him to do gruesome things, which in turn will cause Ariadne to hate him. But he asks Ariadne not to watch the battle and steels himself for the coming fight.
034	THOSE WHO WALK THE CRIMSON ROAD. Ares hides his true feelings as he turns to calm Ariadne. Meanwhile, Baroona and Mikael have yet to kill many more of the Royal Guard. The two succeed in ripping off Bellisk's helmet, exposing an elderly man. The pair are surprised that they would not have so much trouble defeating the old, half-dead man if Ares was there. Bellisk states that the pair are very good for beginning swordsmen on the Crimson Road. Baroona is startled by the reference, since the Crimson Road is the Temple Mercenaries anthem. Bellisk explains that the Road is a way of explaining the warrior's way of life. In order to stall him, Mikael questions Bellisk. Bellisk says that he once wanted to be a farmer like his father, but the power a farmer held was very little. His life went wrong after that, as he held a sword instead of a pitchfork, cutting down fathers, brothers, and sons, unable to live without bloodshed. Soon, he joined the 40 Royal Guard, slaughtered the Minos master, and became the master himself. Recently, he found that something was wrong with the path he took, but that it was too late to go back to being an innocent boy. Mikael regains his breath at this point, but is immediately startled when Bellisk states his dream is to die fighting Kiron, Chronos' master swordsman. Mikael tells Bellisk that Kiron already died by the hands of the Red-Eyed Swordsman. Bellisk replies that he knows, but that Kiron had an apprentice that learned everything from Kiron and would be about Mikael or Baroona's age; and rumor says that the apprentice lost an eye to the Red-Eyed Swordsman ...
035	Ares tells the assassins that he let them live twice, but not for a third time. Helena and Ariadne have become untied, and when two daggers are thrown at Helena, Ares runs in to defend them and gets stabbed in the arm. He kills one of the assassins in a cruel fashion, cutting off his limbs and his tongue. Ariadne cannot believe that it is Ares doing such things and vomits on the ground. Ares is still merciful though, and allows the assassins to escape. The leader's last question to Ares is who Ares' master is? Ares replies that it was Kiron. The assassins make a very hasty escape, leaving all their loot and scrambling for safety. The leader of the assassins explains that Kiron was known as the Swordsman of the Wind because of the sound of the wind when he swings his blade; hearing the wind meant that the opponent was already dead. It is rumored that Kiron was the best swordsman in the world, and it was a miracle that the assassins survived an encounter with his disciple. Inside the house, Ares kills the assassin that he mutilated, even though Ariadne begs him not too. Ares does so since allowing the man to live would make him a cripple. At this point, Ariadne is shocked at Ares' cruelty and yells that he is like a savage. Ares accepts it stoically, because it is what he had to do to save her, and just agrees with her. Ariadne and Helena leave, though Helena looks back. Ares stops his bleeding, noting that nobody ever liked him anyway, but he's still grateful that he was able to protect Ariadne. Outside, Helena is attempting to convince Ariadne to go back to Ares, since he had saved them and she would have done the same if she was Ares. Helena realizes that Ares probably hard a hard time decided what to do, since Ariadne would dislike him for it, but did it because he had to protect Ariadne. Shocked, Ariadne runs back to the house with the excuse that she left her helmet. She finds him slumped on the ground, fast asleep. He wakes up and she hugs him tightly, taking back everything she said earlier.
036	Bellisk moves in quickly and attacks Mikael, nearly impaling his head. The remaining Royal Guard gang up on Mikael, leaving Baroona to fight Bellisk. Bellisk expresses a bland remorse for having to kill such talented kids, but he truly feels nothing. He slashes both of them, leaving them with fairly heavy wounds. Baroona warns Mikael that it's too dangerous to challenge them all at once, but Mikael says that it's disgraceful that they're losing to such an old person when they are so young. He taunts that he will never accept a master as someone who swings a sword just to kill and that Bellisk is just third-rate. Bellisk is not easily provoked though, so he continues taunting the Royal Guard, saying that they're scared and should beg their leader to fight for them. Again, Mikael is dealt several heavy blows and as he is supported by Baroona, he says that Bellisk's honor and name are already buried and that he is fighting like a coward against two nameless Chronosians with 40 Royal Guards. He continues on saying that those looking up to Bellisk are all sneering and that Kiron would not have fought with him, but make his apprentice fight against Bellisk. At this, Bellisk slowly removes his helmet .... Meanwhile, Icarus is interrogating the Minos defense commander. The commander plays dumb, so Icarus brings out a machine used for cutting off people's fingers. The defense commander has already lost nine fingers and says that they can feel free to cut off what's left, still denying knowledge of a secret passage. So, Icarus brings out one of the younger Minos soldier and says that he'll lose all his fingers. At first, the defense commander tells the soldier to stomach the pain, but Icarus tells him that he will be the one operating the machine for every soldier and that the Chronos soldiers will soon be allowed to pillage the village and its people, the commander gives up. On the other hand, Gohue is still running down the pass. Meanwhile, Mikael tells Baroona to take care of the Royal Guard while he goes after Bellisk. Bellisk's face stretches into an insane smile ....

== Volume 06 ==
The sixth volume contains seven chapters.

Chapter	Summary
037	Baroona and Mikael are still fighting Minos' 40 Royal Guard. They are both suffering from injuries and constantly receiving new ones. Bellisk notes that Mikael is amazing, since his movement are getting better instead of becoming sluggish from exhaustion. Likewise, Mikael notes that Bellisk really has spirit. They agree that fights are unpredictable and thus thrilling.
038	Gohue reaches the end of the pass and sees Icarus and the Chronosians. They nearly kill him since he is dressed like a Minos soldier, but One Arm Sunbae vouches for him. When Gohue tells Icarus to immediately send reinforcements for Baroona and Mikael, Icarus (and Rikion) tell him that both are most likely dead. However, when One Arm Sunbae tells Icarus that Mikael is the one who defeated Kentaro earlier, Icarus immediately sends reinforcements. At the other end of the pass, Mikael is becoming extremely exhausted. He decides that it would be a good place for both him and Bellisk to die, if it had to come to that. Bellisk notes the change in attitude, saying that now Mikael is really willing to put his life on the line to defeat him. They fight on and Mikael, using innovative tactics, stabs Bellisk through the chest. Bellisk seizes Mikael by the throat, but reminisces about his own youth when his father warned him about being a swordsman. It meant giving up his humanity, but Bellisk took that chance, and while running away, learns that his father was formerly a master swordsman in Minos. He gave up his position to raise Bellisk properly and hopes that his son would not follow the same path. However, Bellisk is not swayed by the story and continues along the road. Back at the battle, Bellisk says that Mikael is too precious too kill, and gives him the advice not to live his life with regret. And upon his request, Mikael slays Bellisk. Meanwhile, only six of the Royal Guard are left after Baroona has slaughtered the others. They give up at this point and surrender the king. Mikael makes them pick up their discarded weapons to fight again .... Gohue, Icarus, and the reinforcements arrive on the scene to find all slaughtered, the king tied up, and Baroona and Mikael alive. Baroona is conflicted, believing that Mikael's slaughtering the last six Guards was not necessary. Eventually, the Minos king signed a treaty and the soldiers all went home.
039	Five days later, the soldiers are back near Ariadne's house. Mikael gives Ares a diamond necklace to give to Ariadne. By now, Helena is kinder to Ares. Ariadne bestows upon Ares the gift of a poorly made lunch. The soldiers ship out. BLACK CYGNUS. Cygnus is 19, an orphan--his father was a general who died in battle 10 years before; his mother died four years ago. He does not want to do or be anything and lives {?} Subra. His one hate was when a delivery boy, a bunch of Chronos' soldiers had teamed up to beat on him and steal the food he was delivering. Cygnus eventually gets two pence from the soldiers for the offense,. The soldiers leave but Cygnus has a good laugh as the food cost one pence.
040	At the food store where Cygnus works, the VIP room is flooded with soldiers. They manhandle Cygnus' friend Sara into the room and lock the door. When Cygnus returns for lunch and hears of what is happening, his face darkens and he asks someone to fetch his spear. He fights his way through the soldiers and crashed through the VIP room door. After seeing what the soldiers have done to Sara, he asks his boss to take her to the hospital, then decides to show the soldiers what a beast can really do.
041	Daraak's best military unit, the Dark Knights, are moving into Subra. Meanwhile, the fight from the VIP room has moved outside and people are crowding around to see. Cygnus grabs a nearby pitchfork and later a rusty sword. The soldiers are impressed by his movements, noting that he moves like a dancing swan. At this point, he retrieves his spear, and with extreme ease, slaughters the captain of the soldiers.
042	Cygnus has killed a decent number of the soldiers and the Black Knights now arrive. The soldiers' excuse for being unable to greet the Black Knights is that Cygnus has killed 100 of their men. The leader of the Black Knights wishes to capture Cygnus alive. The ten Black Knight captains quickly subdue him, marveling at Cygnus' stamina.
043	When Cygnus was little, his mother made him swear to hate the Chronosians for as long as he lived, since they disgraced his father and caused their family to lose everything. Cygnus carried his father's spear, and his mother tells him that the only thing that will appease his spirit is Chronosian blood. In the present, Cygnus is brought before the Black Knight's general, who tells Cygnus that he has killed over 150 Daraakian soldiers - a crime which results in capital punishment (death). Cygnus accepts his fate stoically. However, the general offers him a proposition that will allow him to live--join the Black Knights or be executed. Cygnus becomes a Black Knight. The general has taken off his helmet, and Cygnus is shocked by the red eyes. In the end, the Black Knights are moving to take over Chronos' capital, Corint.

== Volume 07 ==
This starts with Ares and co meeting the daraak black knights. Then we find that the leader of the black knights has red eyes and Ares believe him to be the red eyed swordsman who killed his master. Then on the way back they are attacked and we then flip to Ares past and his meeting with Kiron The seventh volume contains chapters 45-51.

Chapter Summary

Chapter	Summary
044	Chronos year 273, the Black Knights and Daraaks 7th legion take Chronos' Cornit Castle. The Cornit Castle Guards who were weakened by ten years of peace were no match for the battle hardened Daraakian Soldiers. Taking no prisoners they killed everyone, even those who surrendered. A few days later the government officials met and appointed Icarus to go to Cornit and negotiate with the Daraakian's. Some of the officials were hoping Icarus would be killed on the mission and if not they plotted to have him killed on the way back. Mikael suspects Ares is Kiron's apprentice. Mikael, Baroona, Ares and Gohu go to get their fortune told.
045	Icarus visits the Temple Mercenaries to request Mikael and Baroona as body guards on his mission to Cornit Castle. Mikael requested Ares and Gohu come along too. Back in Chronos the Head General and Secretary Antonis plan a coup d'état by starting an uprising and killing the King while Icarus is away. Splitting the country in two and both becoming rulers, and hero's to the people by freeing them of the mad King's reign. Icarus reveals the reason behind him hiring the Temple Mercenaries. Icarus and the gang arrive at Cornit.
046	The Leader of the Black Swans orders Cygnus to kill Icarus if the chance presents itself. Icarus and the Leader debate over Cornit Castle. Tension rises in the room between all parties. Ares feels something is not right with the Leader. Ares remembers the Red=Eyed Swordsman taking his right eye. As the negotiations break down Ares realizes that the Leader has red eyes and attacks him to avenge his master. Mikael stops Ares before any blood is shed and they leave Cornit.
047	Ares feeling down after meeting Red-Eyes refuses to eat. Mikael confronts Ares about being Kirons apprentice. They arrive at Tollino, the ruins of the old Capital and are attacked by the government soldiers that accompanied them on their mission. Ares tells them they were right about being Kirons apprentice and that Kiron did not lose because it was an unfair fight. He asks them to help him avenge his Master. Ares joins the fray and they end up defeating all the attacker in ten minutes. They find the remnants of a statue of Kiron in the ruins. Flash back to the first time Kiron hears about the Red-Eyed Swordsman.
048	Flashback to the past. An old man named Lord Kaiser dies. The Lady of the house and her son plot to have Kaiser's Mistress and Son Sebastian killed. Sebastian and his mom are attacked by an assassin during their escape. Sebastian's mom is killed trying to protect him. Kiron who is making camp in the forest hears a child's cry. Sebastian jumps off a cliff into the forest below.
049	Kiron finds Sebastian unconscious but alive and brings him back to his camp. The assassin follows Sebastian to Kirons camp. Kiron kills the assassin in a duel
050	Sebastian wakes up and cannot remember his name or where is he. Kiron asks him if he has a place to go. When Sebastian says no Kiron invites him to come with him. Before they leave Kiron and Sebastian bury his mom. Sebastian does not remember her. Kiron asks Sebastian what he wants his name to be. He asks Kiron who the strongest person is Kiron tells him that it was probably Ares the god of war. So he decides to go by Ares. Six months later Ares is training and Kiron gives him his first sword and they start dueling practice. One year later people start showing up to challenge Kiron. Kiron tired of this decides that they will move to a less populated area.
051	On the road Ares and Kiron meet a man with many swords. He asks if they know of a swordsman named Kiron. Kiron replies that he himself is just a wandering swordsman and he doesn't know anything

== Volume 08 ==
This is the volume were we learn about Ares past and see how he lost his eye to the red eyed swordsman we also get to meet kiron and see the battle between him and the red eyed swordsman

The eighth volume contains chapters 52-58.

Chapter	Summary
052	Ares comes down to town on Sunday to play. None of the kids want to play with him and beat him up. Edel seeing this gives Ares a sucker. A few days later Kiron tells Ares to be truly strong they have to train their brain and body. Edel and Ares start hanging out. Edels parents find out that she is playing with Ares and forbid her from ever seeing him again. Ares starts to train everyday not wanting to go to town.
053	Three years later Ares age ten. Kiron takes Ares to dojos for fighting experience they end up beating everyone there.
054	Ares goes down to the village to buy groceries. In town Ares sees Edel and she pretends she doesn't know him. Ares age 12. Kiron and Ares go into town. Ares admires a blue sweatshirt with a spider design on it. Kiron almost gets run over by a horse-drawn carriage. Kiron goes back into town to buy Ares the sweatshirt. Ares is surprised that his Master bought him clothes. While talking about it Ares realizes that Kiron is losing his sight.
055	The man with many swords that Ares and Kiron met the road comes to the village looking for Kiron. Hearing that there was a nameless swordsman living in the mountains he follows Ares on his way home from the market. Ares keeps thinking that he was followed but every time he looks back he doesn't see anyone. Kiron admits to himself that he is well and truly blind. He contemplates leaving Ares so he doesn't become a burden. Kiron informs Ares that he was followed home. Once the man with many swords confirms that Kiron is really Kiron he challenges him to a fight. Kiron realizes that this is the man known as The Red-Eyed Swordsman. Ares says his Master can't fight when he can't see. Ares is no match for The Red-Eyed Swordsman. Kiron attacks realizing that Ares is about to be killed. With information from Ares, Kiron is able to build a picture of his opponent in his minds eye.
056	Kiron and The Red-Eyed Swordsman start to fight. Kiron tries to convince Ares to run. Kiron tells of how he became known as The Swordsman of The Wind. Still fighting, The Red-Eyed Swordsman tries to lure Kiron into the forest. When Kiron doesn't fall for it he drags Ares into the forest so Kiron doesn't have any choice. Ares is tied to a tree. Kiron and The Red-Eyed Swordsman continue their fight. Kiron doesn't fight well in the forest. Kiron protect Ares from a falling tree, free's him from his bonds and tells him to run. This time Ares runs.
057	Kiron hears the wind. He says that wind whispered in his ears telling him that he will die today, that his life's purpose was to put a sword in Ares had and that Ares would kill The Red-Eyed Swordsman and avenge him. Ares decides not run away on his way back to the forest he encounters The Red-Eyed Swordsman who is holding Kiron's severed head. Ares attacks The Red-Eyed Swordsman and manages to scar his face. Betting that Kiron's prediction was right he spares Ares life but takes his right eye so that he will never forget.
058	A few days later Ares sets out promising that he will not return until he avenges his Master. Back to the present. Mikael, Baroona and Gohu agree to help Ares avenge his Master. Genesis finds Icarus on the road to tell him that the king was assassinated and the country split into two. Icarus doesn't know what to do.

== Volume 09 ==
The ninth volume contains chapters 59-65.

Chapter	Summary
059	Antonis and Bayer have killed the King and taken over the kingdom. Several of the local lords could not and would not accept them as rulers and formed their own rebellion against them, but they are dying off one by one. Their last strong hold is at the small district of Nellie. The lords aren’t going to hold Nellie for much longer, wishing that Icarus was with them as they heard he died at Cornit. The soldiers break for lunch while the rebel soldiers lose hope. In the middle of lunch Icarus shows up with the Temple Mercenaries.
060	The Temple Mercenaries join the fray while Icarus goes to find his “arms and legs”. General Icarus finds the 7th and 8th legion and convinces them that he really is alive, and rallies them to fight against the usurpers. Gohu finds somewhere to hide and draw the battle. Commander of the Temple Mercenaries breaks his way into the enemies’ center. Antonis and Bayer make their escape. Ares interrupts the Commanders battle to ask him about the cafeteria menu. Mikael has to be ordered to stop killing after the fighting stops.
061	Icarus gives the enemy soldiers a chance to do what they want. Go back to their previous rules, stay with him or go home. Most of the soldiers pledged their allegiance to Icarus, some went home and no one went back to Bayer and Antonis. The Daraakians that invaded Cornit Castle plan to make their move while Chronos has their civil war. Cygnus dreams about marrying Sara, he then has a nightmare about his mother and decides to kill as army Chronosians as he can. The Temple Mercenaries get ready to leave for Bist. Mikael gets a late night guest, Baroon aoverhears them talking and finds out the Mikael is the prince of Isiris.
062	The civil war starts. The difference in numbers is great. Antonis calls out the heavy infantry. Icarus calls a retreat while ordering the cavalry unit to hold the enemy back. Icarus runs and Antonis chases.
063	Antonis and his army come across a forest sending out the scouts to look for and ambush. On the other side of the forest Icarus and his troops are taking a break. When Antonis and his army finally break through the forest they see Icarus’ army fleeing to the next forest. Sending out the scouts again they waste more time and find nothing. Bayer upset about the wasted time charges after Icarus’ army ignoring Antonis’ warnings that this is a trap. Realizing that Bayer won't listen to him Antonis makes his escape. Icarus challenges Bayer to a one on one duel.
064	Bayer knocks Icarus to the ground and just when he is about to kill him Baroona, Ares and Mikael pop up from holes in the ground and kill him. Icarus persuades the enemy to surrender so they can fight of Daraak and protect their home together. The civil war ends with only 400 losses. To prevent Antonis from gaining any followers Icarus takes the whole army to recapture the capital. Meanwhile, the Chronosians wait for a new King.
065	Antonis’ wanted poster are finally up knowing he cannot escape he goes to Cornit and offers Chronos to the Daraakians for half of the land and his allegiance. The Daraakians kill him. Meanwhile, in Chronos after many days of deliberation the government officials ask Icarus to be King. At first Icarus refuses but they make an impressive case, so the first age of Icarus came to be. Ares and Mikael play ball. Ouranos the Gladiator Champion of Daraak heads to Cornit with Daraakian reinforcements.

== Volume 10 ==
The tenth volume contains chapters 66-72.

Chapter	Summary
066	Mikael has a recurring dream. The Temple Mercenaries set out to war with The Daraakians.
067	The Temple Mercenaries arrive at the battlefield. Ouranos, Daraakians Champion Gladiator is sent out to duel. He fights a noble named Master Richie, who is defeated.
068	Heavy Infantry, 30th Regiment Capitan, Saulo steps forward to fight Ouranos. Saulo is killed and another man goes out to duel Ouranos.
069	Ouranos is finally losing. Ouranos ends up turning the tables and killing his contender. Daraakians moral is very high and Chronos’ moral is very low. Mikael is about to go out when Baroona says he'd be going. Ares drags Mikael and Gohu to the front to get a better look at the duel.
070	Ouranos and Baroona start fighting. Daraakians notice that Baroona is the previous Gladiator Champion. Baroona invites Ouranos to fight for Chronos and he refuses. He enjoys being a Gladiator too much. Ouranos suggests they handcuff themselves together. Baroona rises to the challenge even though it puts him at a disadvantage. Barooa starts to lose.
071	Baroona has flashbacks of his teacher and fellow gladiator. Baroona kills Ouranos by using a weapon violating the rules of handcuffed combat. In the end it was still Ouranos’ win. Ares and the gang take him to get fixed up while the Daraakians send out Cygnus to fight.
072	Baroona is checked out by a doctor and is going to be ok. Cygnus invades enemy lines to “pay his respects to the king”. A man named Slib challenges Cygnus. Ares fights through the crowd to fight Cygnus recognizing him as the man who protected the Red-Eyed Swordsman. When he gets to Cygnus he interrupts Slibs invitation to duel. Mikael heads down to the front to get a better look at the fight.

== Volume 11 ==
The eleventh volume contains chapters 73-77.

Chapter	Summary
073	Slib starts attacking Cygnus. Even though he's fighting Cygnus is still paying more attention to Ares who is waiting patiently for him to finish his fight. As soon as Cygnus is about to finish off Slib, Ares steps in and gets Mikael to get him out of the way so he can fight. As they start to fight they introduce themselves.
074	Ariadne receives a letter and present from Ares. Cygnus and Ares continue their fight. Cygnus scores a hit on Ares and Mikael lends him Bellisk's sword to finish the fight. Sara receives a letter from Cygnus.
075	Ares and Cygnus continue their fight. Icarus readies the army for battle. The battle starts as Ares and Mikael run for the safety of their own lines.
076	Both armies attack first with archers and cavalry, then chariots. Mercenaries fight with grappling hooks and spears on the king's orders. Baroona goes to fight against medics orders. Genesis suggests that they retreat and regroup. Icarus holds off while Mikael fronts an attack on the Black Knights. One-Arm Sunbae dies. Mikael goes to avenge him while he sends Ares to avenge his master with Bellisk's Sword. Cygnus gets in Ares’ way so he has no choice but to finish their fight before he gets to the Red-Eyed Swordsman.
077	Mikael starts his fight with One-Armed Sunbaes killer and avenges him. Ares and Cygnus head to a small forest on the side of the battlefield to finish their fight. Meanwhile, on the battlefield the Mercenaries are victorious in their battle and go to help King Icarus. The Daraakians surrender and The Red-Eyed Swordsman runs away and another Red-Eyed Swordsman?? watches the battle from above. Chronos sends people after the deserters.

== Volume 12 ==
The twelfth volume contains chapters 78-83 .

Chapter	Summary
078	Cygnus and Ares fight. Very well matched and somehow they end up with each other's weapons. After trading weapons back they start again. The leader of the Black Knights (Red-Eyed Swordsman) is surrounded by Chronosarions.
079	Ares beats the crap out of Cygnus but leaves him alive. Gives him back the picture of his girlfriend that he dropped and a crapit pie. Ares heads back to the battlefield to find out that his prey is on the run and borrows a horse to catch up. Mikael goes into the forest and kills Cygnus.
080	Ares catches up with his prey and attacks to avenge his Master. The Red-Eyed leader of the Black Knights claims that he is not the Red-Eyed Swordsman but that is in fact his younger brother named Kirberos. Ares doesn't believe him and attacks. Mikael shows up to help Ares and they kill him only to realize he was telling the truth when he said that he was not the Red-Eye Swordsman. The scar Ares put on his face is not there. The real Red-Eyed Swordsman shows up to say "Hi" to Ares and takes on and kills the remaining Black Knights to protect his “prey”.
081	The Red-Eyed Swordsman beats/plays with Mikael and Ares saying he wouldn't fight them after they exhausted themselves in several hours of battle and left. Neither boy could stop him. Carnival goes after a bounty and ends up fighting Mikaels subordinates. After deeming them strong enough he agrees to become a “Dog of Mikael”.
082	Mikael and Ares have become quiet after their fight with the Red-Eyed Swordsman. Mikael gets visitor with bad news about his father's health and a rebellion led by his uncle. Mikael retires from the Mercenaries when he won't tell Ares why, Ares get hurt and tells him they are no longer friends. Mikael leaves in a carriage. When he starts heading in the wrong direction he thinks assassins have him, then he realizes that he's just been shanghaied by Ares, Baroona and Gohu. In the carriage Ares gives Mikael his new helmet, Baroona a snake pendant and Gohu a Drawing of Ares, Mikael and Baroona. Since Mikael doesn't have much he gives Ares Bellisk's sword saying he doesn't need it anymore.
083	Mikael reaches his “dogs” and they prepare to set sail. Mikael tells Nikolai he needs to talk to him about the Red-Eyed Swordsman and asks if they are from the same clan and gets a history of the Red-Eyes. Mikael arrives at home. After talking with his father and claiming he wants to take Chronos he goes to greet his uncle.

== Volume 13 ==
The thirteenth volume contains chapters 84-92.

== Volume 14 ==
The fourteenth volume contains chapters 92-102.

== Volume 15 ==
The fifteenth volume contains chapters 103-109.

== Volume 16 ==
The sixteenth volume contains chapters 110-117.

== Volume 17 ==
The seventeenth volume contains chapters 118-124.

== Volume 18 ==
The eighteenth volume contains chapters 125-135.

== Volume 19 ==
The nineteenth volume contains chapters 136-143.

== Volume 20 ==
The twentieth volume contains chapters 144-153.

== Volume 21 ==
The twenty-first volume contains chapters 154-163.

== Volume 22 ==
The twenty-second volume contains chapters 164-171.

== Volume 23 ==
The twenty-third volume contains chapters 172-180.

== Volume 24 ==
The twenty-fourth volume contains chapters 181-189.

== Volume 25 ==
The twenty-fifth volume contains chapters 190-198.

== Volume 26 (end) ==
The twenty-sixth volume contains chapters 199-207. Ares defeats the Red Eyed Swordsman and the Temple Mercenaries is restored.
