= Ryu Kum-chel =

Ryu Kum-chel 류금철
- Born: Daejeon, South Korea
- Area: Artist
- Notable works: Ares, Nephilim

- Ryu Kum-chel
- Hangul: 류금철
- RR: Ryu Geumcheol
- MR: Ryu Kŭmch'ŏl

Ryu Kum-chel (Korean: 류금철) is a manhwa (Korean comics) artist from Daejeon, South Korea. His representative works are Ares, Nephilim, and King Muryeong. According to a manhwa critic, Lee Seung-nam's review of Ares in 2004, Ryu showed a mature style and presentation as opposed to his short career as a manhwa artist.
