= Ares (rocket) =

In terms of rocketry, Ares could mean:

- Ares I and Ares V, canceled rockets part of the Constellation program
- Ares ICBM, a proposed ICBM and SST launch vehicle
- Aerial Regional-scale Environmental Survey (ARES), a proposed Martian rocket airplane
- Aries (rocket), a modified LGM-30 Minuteman missile, used to test missile defense systems

== See also ==
- Ares (disambiguation)
