= Sand table =

Table using constrained sand for modelling or educational purposes

A sand table, or sandboard, uses constrained sand for writing, modelling, or educational purposes. The original version of a sand table may be the abax used by early Greek students. They were later used throughout the Arab world. In the modern era, one common use for a sand table is to make terrain models for military planning and wargaming.

== Abax ==
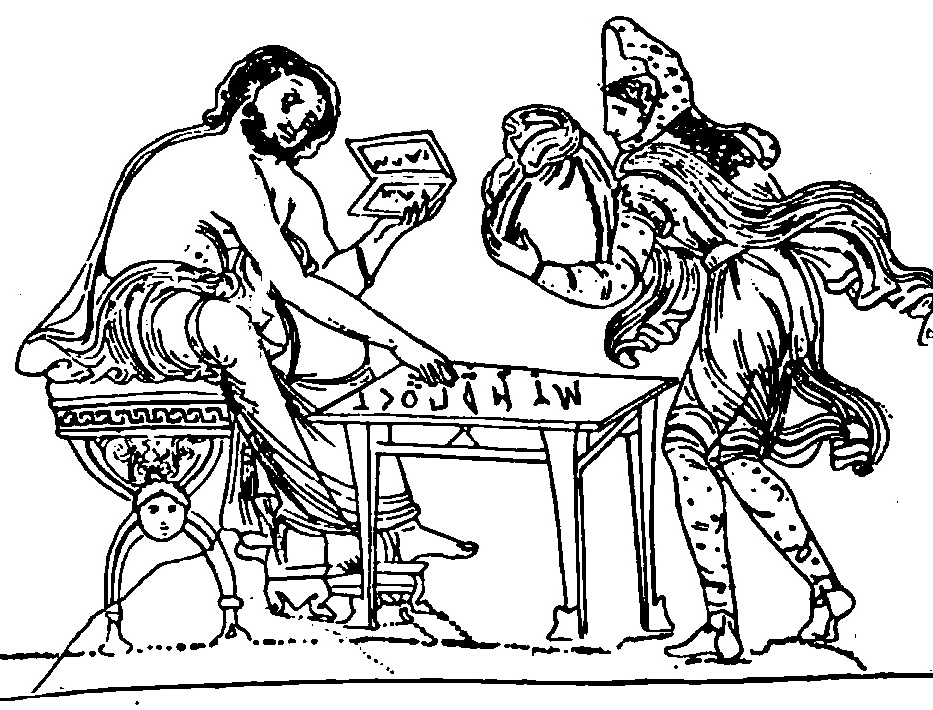
Abax depicted on the Darius Vase

An abax (ἄβαξ) was a table covered with sand commonly used by students, particularly in Greece, to perform studies such as writing, geometry, and calculations.

The abax was the predecessor to the abacus. Objects, such as stones, were added for counting and then columns for place-value arithmetic. The demarcation between an abax and an abacus seems to be poorly defined in history; moreover, modern definitions of the word abacus universally describe it as a frame with rods and beads and, in general, do not include the definition of "sand table".

The sand table may well have been the predecessor to some board games. ("The word abax, or abacus, is used both for the reckoning-board with its counters and the play-board with its pieces, ..."). Abax is from the old Greek for "sand table".

== Ghubār ==
An Arabic word for sand (or dust) is ghubār (or gubar), and Western numerals (the decimal digits 0–9) are derived from the style of digits written on dust boards (or takht) in North-West Africa and Iberia, also described as the 'West Arabic' or 'ghubār' style.

== Military use ==
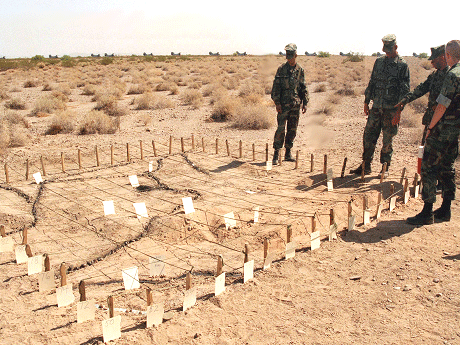
Marines view a sand table model of the operating area of Exercise Desert Punch constructed on the desert floor near Yuma, Arizona

Sand tables have been used for military planning and wargaming for many years as a field expedient, small-scale map, and in training for military actions. In 1890 a Sand table room was built at the Royal Military College of Canada for use in teaching cadets military tactics; this replaced the old sand table room in a pre-college building, in which the weight of the sand had damaged the floor. The use of sand tables increasingly fell out of favour with improved maps, aerial and satellite photography, and later, with digital terrain simulations. More modern sand tables have incorporated Augmented Reality, such as the Augmented Reality Sandtable (ARES) developed by the Army Research Laboratory. Today, virtual and conventional sand tables are used in operations training.

In 1991, "Special Forces teams discovered an elaborate sand-table model of the Iraqi military plan for the defense of Kuwait City. Four huge red arrows from the sea pointed at the coastline of Kuwait City and the huge defensive effort positioned there. Small fences of concertina wire marked the shoreline and models of artillery pieces lined the shore area. Throughout the city were plastic models of other artillery and air defense positions, while thin, red-painted strips of board designated supply routes and main highways."

In 2006, Google Earth users looking at satellite photography of China found a several kilometre large "sand table" scale model, strikingly reminiscent of a mountainous region (Aksai Chin) which China occupies militarily in a disputed zone with India, 2400 km from the model's location. Speculation has been rife that the terrain is used for military exercises of familiarisation.

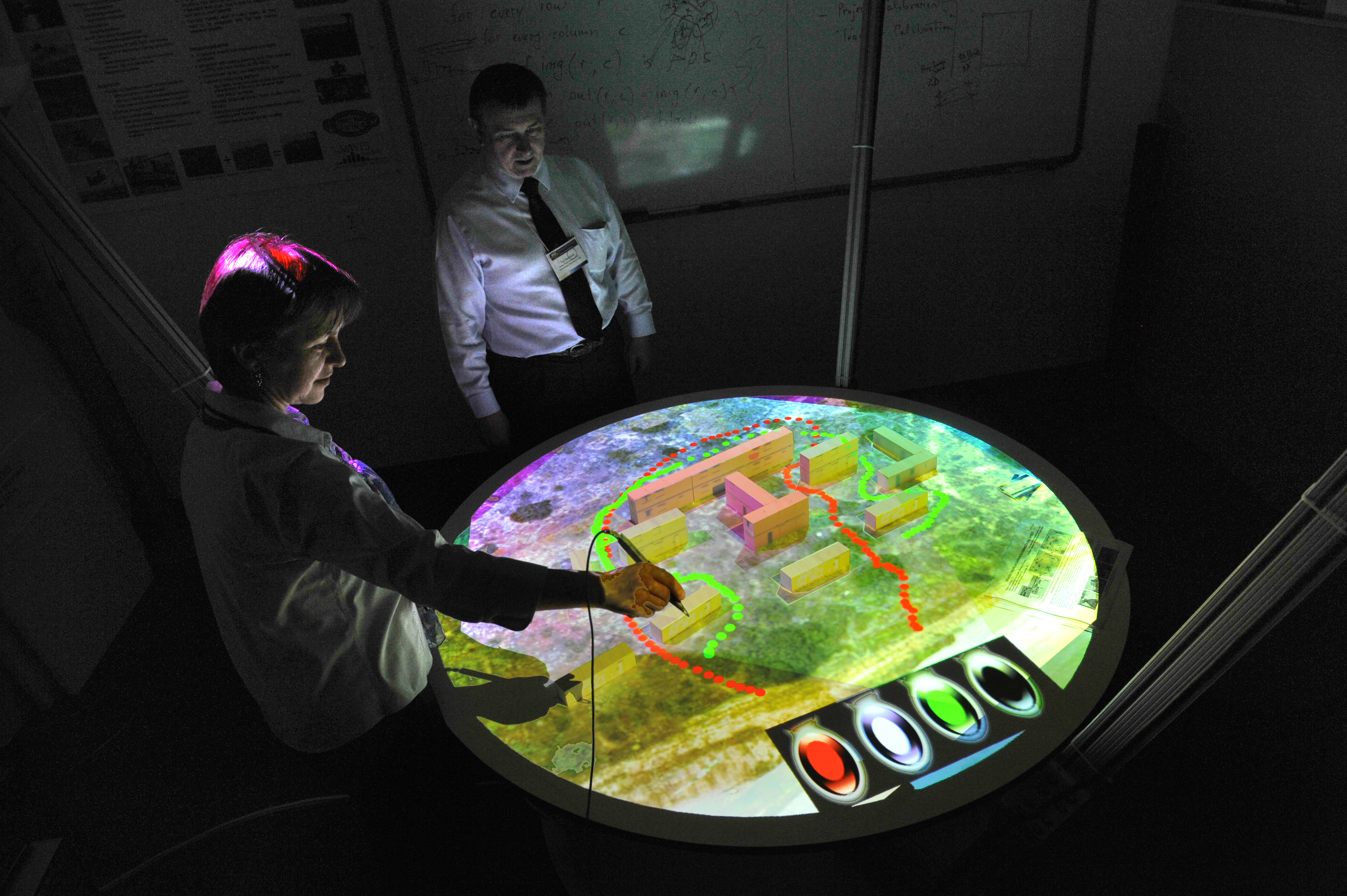
Virtual sand table for urban warfare operations training

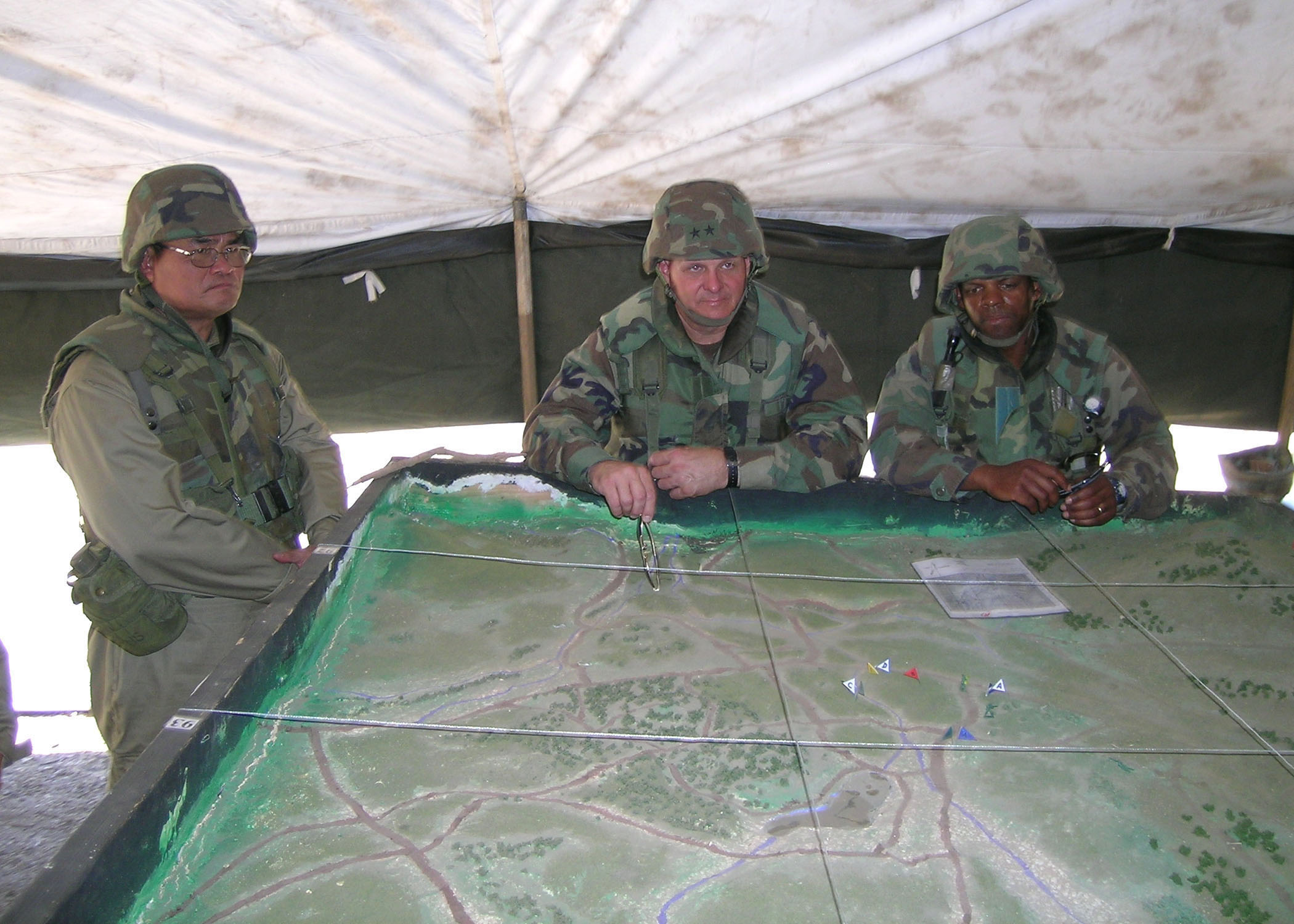
A sand table in the forward operating base

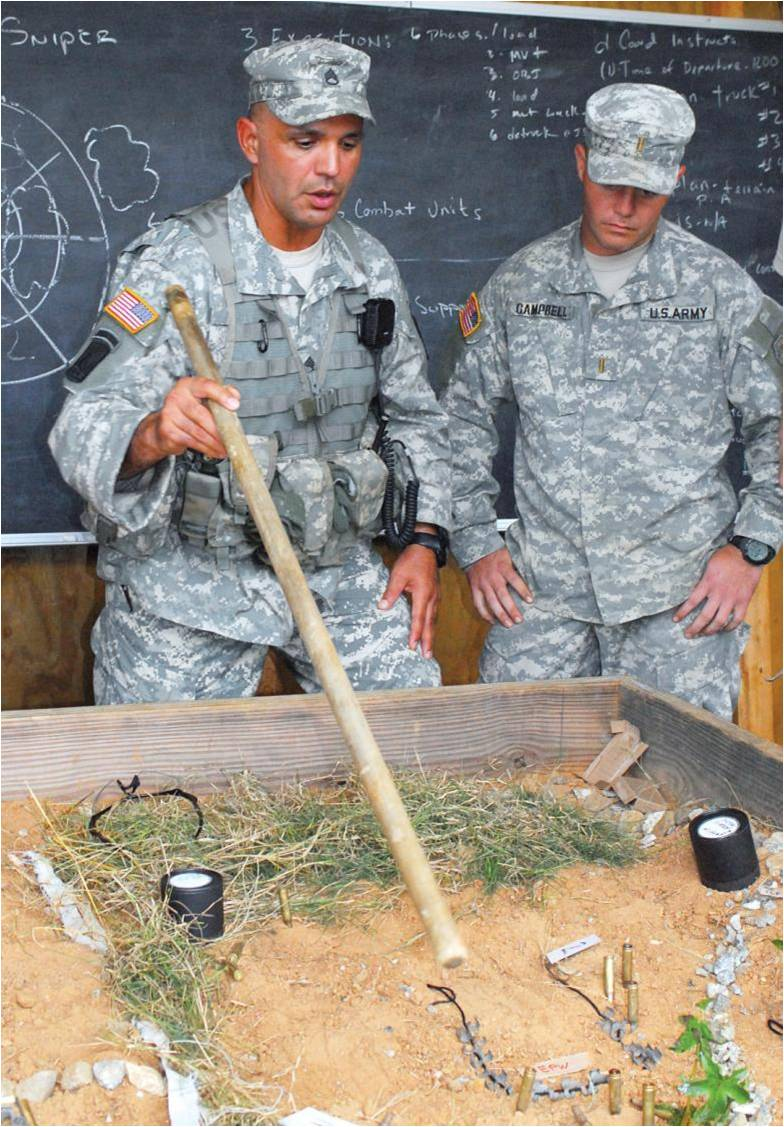
US Army 2LTs complete Leader Forge using a sand table

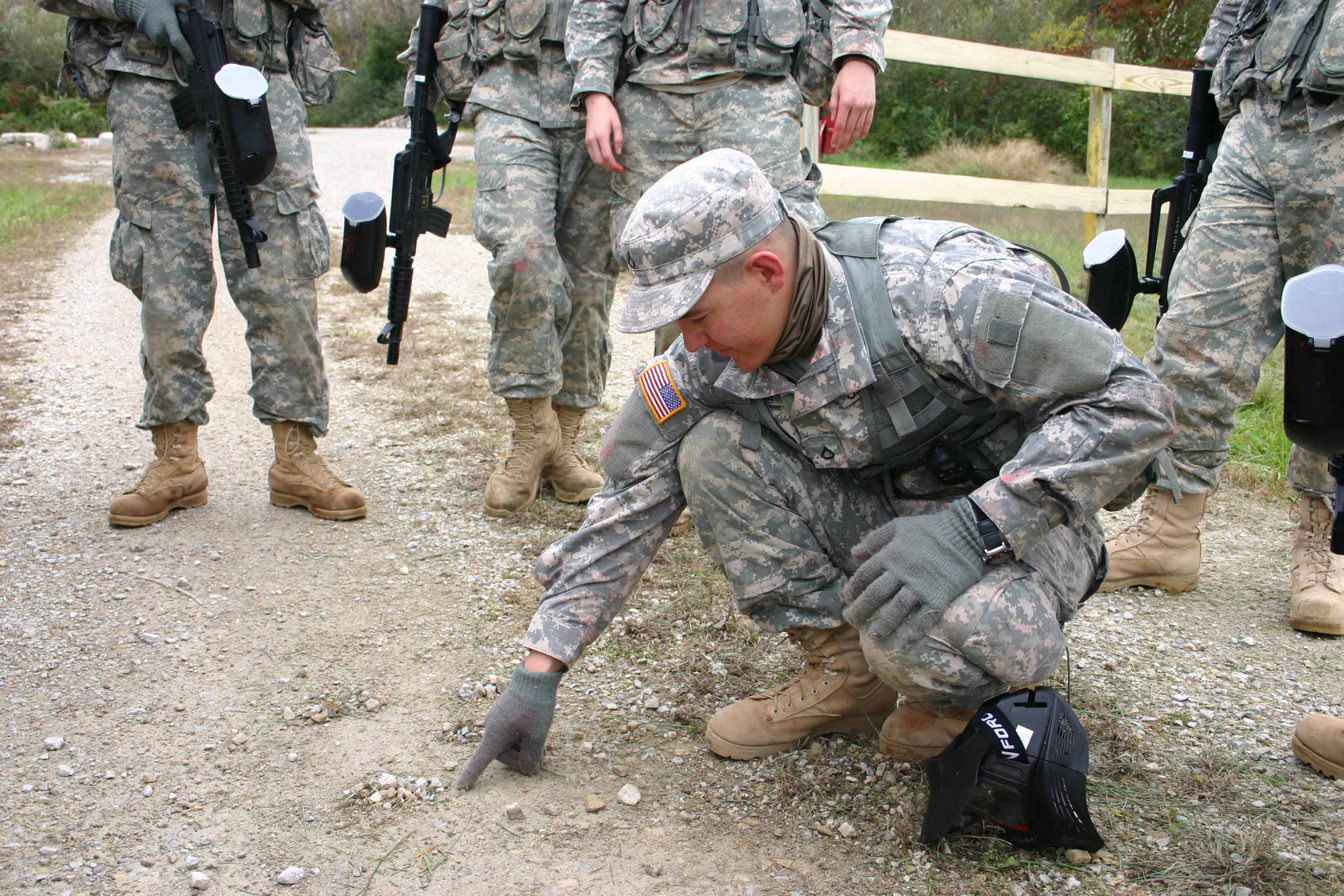
US Army Patriot Academy students participate in military training using a sand table

== Education ==
A sand table is a device useful for teaching in the early grades and for special needs children.

== See also ==
- Sandcastle
