= Ares (missile) =

Proposed intercontinental ballistic missile

Ares ICBM
- Manufacturer: Glenn L. Martin Company
- Country of origin: United States

Size
- Height: 30.00 m (98.00 ft)
- Diameter: 3.00 m (9.80 ft)
- Width: 3.00 m (9.80 ft)
- Mass: 150,000 kg (330,000 lb)
- Stages: 1

Capacity
- Payload to LEO: 4,000 kg (8,800 lb), at 160 km orbit

Associated rockets
- Family: Titan

Launch history
- Status: Cancelled

The Ares was a proposed intercontinental ballistic missile (ICBM) derived from the Titan II missile. It was a single-stage rocket with a high-performance engine to increase the rocket's specific impulse. Both Aerojet and Rocketdyne carried out engine design studies for the project, but Ares was ultimately cancelled in favour of solid-fuel ICBMs, which were safer to store and could be launched with much less notice. The Ares missile series was canceled due to the inconvenience of using liquid fuel. Some reasons included extensive protection from corrosion within the silos, as well as the liquid fuel propellant, ideally used in the proposed Ares missiles, being more expensive to maintain. Thus making the transition to use the Minuteman II missiles, that ran on solid fuel, easier because solid fuel was more reliable for sand was less expensive than previous projects. Hence the cancellation of the Ares missile series.

== Specification ==
Sources:

- Payload: 4,000 kg (8,800 lb)
- Payload Orbit: 160 km
- Height: 30.00 m (98.00 ft)
- Diameter: 3.00 m (9.80 ft)
- Width: 3.00 m (9.80 ft)
- Mass: 150,000 kg (330,000 lb)
