= Muela de Ares =

Mountain in Spain

Coordinates: 40°27′58″N 0°07′44″W

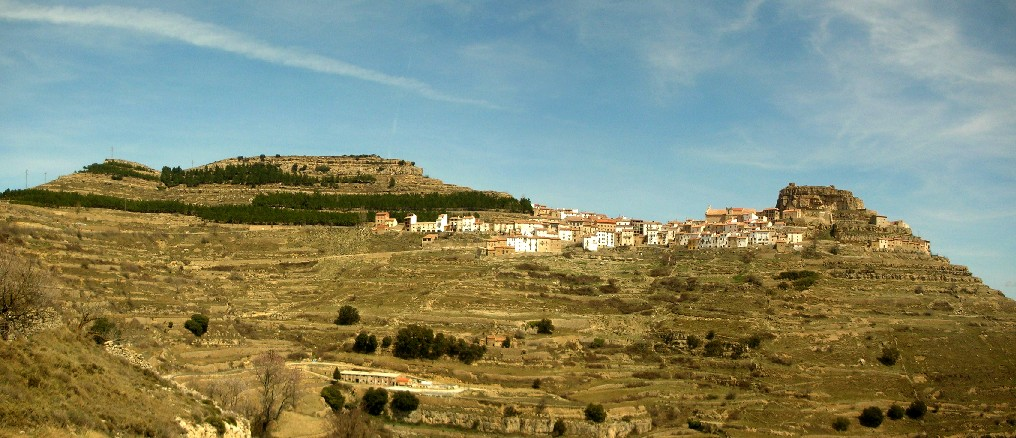
View of the mountain

Muela de Ares is a mountain in the province of Castellón (Valencian Community, Spain). It is one of the highest mountains of the Valencian Community, at 1,319 meters elevation.

In eastern Spain, the term Muela (or Mola in Catalan) is used to define a mountain with a plane in its top. In the case of the Muela de Ares the area of this plane is roughly 2 square kilometers. Near the Muela de Ares, 2 kilometers approximately, there is a twin Muela, called Muela del Vila, with the same characteristics.

Both mountains are property of the municipality of Ares del Maestrat, which has recently rejected a plan for installing a wind farm on them.
