= Atmospheric Reentry Experimental Spaceplane =

Atmospheric Reentry Experimental Spaceplane (ARES) is a robotic spaceplane concept. The project merged with the French Dassault Aviation VEHRA programme to produce a concept called Dassault Ares Spaceplane.

== Overview ==
The initial concept study was produced by Aerospatiale in 1998, called Atmospheric Reentry Demonstrator (ARD). ARES envisioned a delta wing spaceplane with a mass of 2,000 kg (4,400 lb) and a wingspan of 3.5 m (11 ft). Aerodynamic studies in wind tunnels were performed between 2005 and 2009 when engineers tested some phases of the reentry trajectory at several Mach numbers and angles of attack. The results obtained characterized the drag, lift, and pitching moment coefficients as functions of the angle of attack and Reynolds number.

The ARES design was merged with the Dassault VEHRA project to produce a single French proposal, called Dassault Ares Spaceplane, which was proposed to the Intermediate eXperimental Vehicle technology demonstrator of the ESA Future Launchers Preparatory Programme. This was to be a 2,000 kg (4,400 lb) reusable winged rocket-powered atmospheric demonstrator capable of reaching speeds of Mach 4 to 10 and was aimed at building up experience between 2003-2007 in reuse operations and high-speed atmospheric flight for landing on a runway.

After reviewing several European submissions, ESA officials chose in 2010 an Italian design now known as the Space Rider, which is now in development and expected to be dropped from a balloon in 2019 and will have a first flight atop a Vega-C rocket in 2020 or 2021.

== See also ==
- Atmospheric Reentry Demonstrator, ESA spaceplane prototype tested once in 1998
- Intermediate eXperimental Vehicle, an ESA Programme
- IXV, prototype tested in 2015
- OREX, equivalent Japanese demonstrator from 1994
- Space Rider, spaceplane to be tested in 2022
