= Vagrant Soldier Ares =

Korean manhwa by Ryu Kum-chel

- Cover of Ares vol. 1 (2001), art by Ryu Kum-chel

떠돌이 용병 아레스 RR: Tteodori yongbyeong Areseu MR: Ttŏdori yongbyŏng Aresŭ
- Genre: Action/adventure
- Author: Ryu Kum-chel
- Publisher: (South Korea) BB Comics
- English publisher: (United States) Team Mania
- Original run: 2001–2007
- Volumes: 26

Vagrant Soldier Ares (Korean: 떠돌이 용병 아레스), whose title is commonly abbreviated as Ares, is a Korean manhwa written and drawn by Ryu Kum-chel. The story centers on young swordsman Ares and takes place in a world similar to Ancient Rome. The manhwa is noted for its fluid action sequences and subtle anachronism.

== Summary ==
The world of Ares is similar to Ancient Rome and shares important names with that history. The protagonists belong to or ally with the central country of Chronos. Daraak and the Radnik Alliance flank Chronos' western border, Isiris flanks its southern border, Silonica flanks its eastern border, and the island nation of Minos is off its northern coast.

At the story's onset, Ares meets Mikael Graccio when both enlist with Temple Mercenaries, the most respected soldiers-for-hire in Chronos. Their comrades Baroona and Gohue are also soldiers for Temple Mercenaries.

== Characters ==
Name	Age	First appearance	Description	Ending
Ares (born Sebastion)	18 years old when the story begins	Chapter 1	Ares is the main protagonist. He is the bastard son of a nobleman named Kaiser. He lost his memories at the age of 6 after jumping off a cliff during a failed assassination instigated by his half brother, the legitimate heir to their father. Kiron chanced upon him during the assassination attempt, rescued him, and took him on as an apprentice. After 6 years, Kirberos tracked down the retired recluse Kiron and killed him to collect his sword. Ares lost his right eye to Kirberos during this fight and vowed vengeance. After killing Kirberos, Ares re-establishes the Temple mercenaries and becomes the commander. Ares is light hearted and friendly in normal situations. He is goofy, cracks jokes, and behaves as if he is simple-minded. For example, he joins the Temple Mercenaries because they provide meals for their members. In battle, Ares is deadly. As expected of Kiron's apprentice, few can stand against his fighting ability. Throughout the course of his travels, Ares has either defeated or fought equally with various legendary characters from his universe. He fights with a sword, but he eliminates weaker opponents with only kicks or elbow strikes. His swordplay and fighting style incorporate quick, hard strikes, and acrobatic maneuvers in order to both evade enemy attacks and enhance his own momentum. He makes good use of his environment: launching off walls, dropping chandeliers on enemies, taking swords from fallen soldiers if his own breaks. Temple Mercenaries gave him B-Rank status after his first skirmish. He is currently A-Rank although he calls himself A+. Ares vowed to not return to his master's grave until he had defeated the Red-Eyed Swordsman. A year after he killed Mikael, Ares killed Kirberos and avenging his master.	last seen dancing with his girlfriend in a ball before the manhwa ends
Mikael Graccio	18 years old	Chapter 1	Mikael journeys to Chronos to fight with Temple Mercenaries and to experience the life of commoners. He is often seen with a leaf in his mouth. After the war with the Radnik Alliance, he receives intelligence of his father's failing health and his uncle's rebellion. He resigns his commission to return to his royal duties. After vanquishing his uncle, he decides to take Chronos for his own. During his time in Chronos, he'd ordered an elite army of children to be trained under the tutelage of Carnival, an ex-Temple Mercenary he defeated in an early battle. Mikael is intelligent, well-educated, and well-versed in military strategy. He is anti-social and considerate to only his closest friends. Like Ares and Baroona, he overlooks the cowardice of Gogh. He gave a spoil to Ares for his girlfriend, and he vowed to help Ares defeat the Red-Eyed Swordsman. He also exhibits considerable bloodlust, which has put him at odds with his comrades. For example, he killed enemy soldiers who have surrendered and allies with battle wounds asking for help. He also killed the exhausted, weaponless Cygnus after Ares had spared his life. Mikael is promoted to B-Rank after his first mission and A-Rank after the invasion of Minos. His victory over a hero of Minos caught the attention of Icarus during its invasion. He is a very strong fighter and typically fights with a sword. While Isiris invaded Chronos, however, Mikeal dreaded every second of it, especially the attack on Temple Mercenaries Headquarters. He delayed the attacks on the headquarters until he knew Ares, Robin, Baroona, and Gohu at least would survive.	He treasured all of the memories he had during the time he was in Chronos and his final words was that he was glad to have at least died at the hands of his best friend Ares, who misunderstood Mikeal's true intentions.
Baroona	18 or 19 years old	Chapter 2	Baroona is a run-away champion gladiator. He is more sensible than Ares and more sane than Mikael. He has a kind-hearted personality. Baroona fights with two daggers tied to the ends of a metal rope-the double dagger rope dart-a weapon given him by his former master and fellow gladiator (who also got him hooked on smokes). He became B-Rank after his first mission and is currently A-Rank. Baroona, alongside Robin and six other Temple Mercenaries, survived the assault when they were sent away on a mission to protect a rich family. While there, he developed a friendship with a young girl. A year after Ares killed Mikael, Baroona joined the hunt for Kirberos with Ares. When they do encounter Kirberos, Baroona defends an unconscious Ares, the resulting battle breaking his knives. Eventually, him and Ares split the bounty money to reestablish the Temple Mercenaries, along with Douglas and Gogh.	
Gogh (AKA Gohu, Gohue, etc.)		Chapter 4	Gogh is an artist and a soldier who can't fight. He joined the mercenaries because he wanted to paint epic battles and believes the proper way to capture them is to experience the battles first hand. Despite his cowardice, he shows courage and loyalty to his friends. Gogh has no fighting ability and rose to B-Rank by surviving enough battles by hiding, playing dead, or relying on the abilities of his friends. After the war with Mikael, he becomes a highly respected artist. During the Isiris war, Gogh survived the attack on the Temple Mercenaries by hiding from them, which Mikael anticipated. Afterwards, he developed a crush on Jill (who's actually Sandra of the Death Knights), which he couldn't purse because Rikion killed her.	
Emergency Food		Chapter 19	The small black bird that hangs around with Ares. Ares was first annoyed by the bird's presence, but Gogh told him the bird could be used as emergency food. Since then the bird is usually seen perched on Ares' shoulder or helmet, occasionally Emergency Food rests on Gogh's shoulder too. When Ares is crucified by the Isiris Graccio soldiers, Emergency Food protects Ares from being eaten by the larger birds of prey.	
Douglas			A mercenary from Marlan. He has a scar on his right cheek and blonde (or white) shaggy hair that covers his left eye. He confronts Ares because he wants to see which of them is a better fighter, but they have to end their fight early. They become friends soon after and he eventually joins Ares, Baroona, Robin, and Gogh's group. Douglas is an intelligent and very strong fighter. Like Mikael and Ares, he is a swordsman, although not at their level. He is also smooth with the ladies, although he was once beaten by Helena for hitting on Ariadne, before finding out she was Ares' girlfriend.	
One-Armed Jack (often referred to as One-Armed-Sunbae)		Chapter 7	An A-Rank soldier. He also has a scar across the bridge of his nose. He is a strong fighter whose ability forces Carnival to fight with both swords. In that battle, he tires and is rescued when Mikael resumes the fight in his stead. One-Armed Jack always dreamed of running a bakery shop when he retired from the Temple Mercenaries.	He died in the Daraak vs Chronos war, his last battle before he was going to retire, promising to Ares that he'd serve him bread. His death spurned Ares to fight even harder against Cygnus.
Robin			A mute and extremely skilled archer of the Temple Mercenaries. He became close friends with Ares, Baroona, Douglas and Gogh.	He was killed in battle after wounding Mikael with an arrow and saving Icarus. His actions forced Mikael's troops to withdraw to heal Mikael.
Ariadne		Chapter 19	The love interest for Ares. She is the daughter of Lord Gizelle and innocent of the world. She follows Ares into the battle at Minos, taking for simple truth his statement that fighting was "fun". He saved her many times and diverted her from witnessing the worst of the battle. After Ares was wounded, Ariadne treated him. When Minos' assassins came and tried to take her and Helena away to Darrak to be sold as slaves, Ares saved them, but Ariadne called him a savage and left him (due to how brutally he killed everyone). Helena chastised her for that, and Ariadne returned and remains his girlfriend. Ariadne was targeted by Mikael and his Death Knights in an effort to kidnap her. When in all reality, Mikael wanted to keep her safe from the war.	
Antonis		Chapter 21	An admiral in Chronos' army. He assassinates the king of Chronos and tries to have Icarus assassinated also. He takes over the country for a brief period of time, during the civil war.	During a meeting with Daarak for an alliance against Icarus, he was killed by Cygnus.
Carnival (nicknamed "Bloodmaster")		Chapter 7	Previously an A-Rank soldier for the Temple Mercenaries and their top fighter. He was known to be merciless and was kicked out for killing a comrade over a trivial matter. Carnival uses two swords and a manic fighting style that reflects his savage nature. Carnival joins an ex-general of Chronos, Shion, and creates with him a bandit group. Carnival meets with the Temple Mercenaries again when they are hired to destroy the bandit group. Carnival nearly kills One-Arm Jack when he is stopped by Mikael who fights with him while the rest of the Temple Mercenaries go onward to fight Shion. Carnival is narrowly defeated by Michael who spares his life causing Carnival to be in Michael's debt while at the same revering him. Carnival is later recruited by Michael to be part his personal guard.	killed by Baroona
Genesis (sometimes spelled "Genasis")		Chapter 21	Icarus' right-hand man. Genesis was considered unworthy at his dojo but Icarus notes him and decides to make him his underling although it shocks the other students and master. Genesis claims that he will do what his master wants him to do: if Icarus says to win he will, and if he says to lose, he will. Genesis is killed by one of the Death Knight's leaders. Mikael then sends his head to Icarus to unnerve him. Genesis has great skill in swordsmanship and is even respected by Carnival. He is defeated by the two Death Knight leaders, Sandra/Ray/Rei, Carnival, and Esteban when he was trying to kill Mikael.	
Gizelle			Ariadne's father. He is a nobleman who supports Icarus during the civil war.	
Helena		Chapter 19	The acknowledged strongest fighter in the port city of Nix and the bodyguard of the Lord Gizelle's daughter, Ariadne. She is initially hostile to Ares and thinks he is a bad influence on Ariadne. When Ariadne stowed away with the soldiers headed to Minos, she realized immediately and set off to rescue her. She warmed to Ares after he protected her and Ariadne from assassins during the invasion of Minos. She has a glare that can discourage most men to approach Ariadne.	
Icarus		Chapter 19	A young general who became the youngest king of Chronos. He first commissioned Temple Mercenaries to help with the pre-emptive invasion of Minos. He hired Mikael, Baroona, Ares, and Gogh as a personal escort for the preliminary talks with the Radnik Alliance. He again hired Temple Mercenaries to assist with the civil war in Chronos after the previous king was assassinated and with the war with the Radnik Alliance shortly afterwards. After the Civil War, the former king's advisors offered him the kingship. Icarus is a calm, thoughtful man, respected and loved by his soldiers. His skill lies with military strategy more than battle, but he fights competently when needed. He also has a good eye for ability, selecting his right-hand man, Genesis, despite that man's bad reputation. He is also a notorious smoker, which he can't give up because of all of the trouble that he has do deal with.	
Kiron, the Master Swordsman of Chronos, also known as the Swordsman of the Wind (for the sound made by his blade as he fought)		Chapter 5	After much battle prestige, Kiron chose a quiet retirement over a government post. By chance he saved the child Ares from an assassin and raised him. During their six years together as master and apprentice, he imparted his skills to the boy as his eyesight slowly failed. They lived quietly until Kirberos, the Red-Eyed Swordsman, tracked them down. Kiron fought well until Kirberos used Ares as bait to lure the now completely blind Master Swordsman into a wooded copse whose layout he did not know as well as his own property.	Kirberos killed Kiron and added Kiron's sword to his collection.
Mickey		Chapter 4	A boy who lives in Jagsen village. Shion's bandits killed his parents when they raided his village. He antagonizes then supports Ares and his group, and promises to join the Temple Mercaneries when he becomes older.	In the last chapter, he is seen joining the new temple mercenaries to keep his promise with Ares.
Shion		Chapter 5	Previously a General of Chronos, Shion goes off to become a bandit lord. Shion uses a giant sword to fight that crushes and slices through most other weapons. The sheath alone weighs 30 kg. Despite the size and weight of his blade "Ionix", Shion moves extremely fast. Shion will fight with his sword sheathed until he finds an opponent that he considers worthy of his blade.	Shion leads a bandit group that terrorizes a nearby town. Shion's group is eventually decimated by the Temple Mercenaries who were hired by the town to defend them. While Michael fights Carnival Shion crushes many Temple Mercenaries eventually meeting his match when Ares appears. Shion begins with the upper hand in battle against Ares but ends up succumbing to Ares' incredible strength. Shion tells Ares that he is born a hero and requests that his men be spared. Ares agrees and with that slices Shion's throat.
Pig		Chapter 11	A large man and a leader in Shion's group of bandits. His soldiers comment that he would steal their food but was otherwise a good commanding officer.	Ares kills him when Temple Mercenaries invade the bandits' headquarters.
Cygnus	see "Ending" column		The son of a deceased Daraakian general whose family fell from nobility to lower class. He loves a girl named Sara. He fought with great skill to protect her from the Black Knights, but their leader threatened her safety if he did not join them. Cygnus displays pacifist behaviour early into his story, but he is very protective of Sara. His father was killed in a war with Chronos, and his late mother raised him to hate all Chronosians. He still has nightmares about her and may be mentally unstable because of that. Cygnus fights with a spear inherited from his father. His skill is such that 10 captains of the Black Knights had to subdue him after he killed 150 regular soldiers from the 6th Regiment. He is called The Black Swan under the Black Knights army because his movements are like a swan. He leaps high and is noted to be acrobatic.	He is defeated by Ares during the war with the Radnik Alliance. Ares spares his life when he discovers that Cygnus also has a girl waiting for him. However, Mikael murders the defenelsess, exhausted Cygnus after Ares leaves him. He was about 19 years old at the time of his death.
Sara			Girlfriend of Cygnus. She and Cygnus work for the same eatery. The Black Knights held her life hostage to force Cygnus to fight for them.	
Kaiser			Silver Wolf Kaiser was Mikael's master. He is an old man who lives with his grand daughter. He acts senile but is actually very sharp witted and skillful with his sword. He is first introduced after Icarus’ defeat against Mikael at Hakuna. Mikael takes Kaiser's granddaughter hostage in order to blackmail him into assassinating Icarus. By this time, Icarus has recruited Ares, Baruna and Douglas as bodyguards, so Kaiser ends up fighting the three and being killed by Ares. When he was younger he fought with Kiron. He defeats Kiron after several hours of fighting, but doesn't kill him. As he leaves, he tells Kiron not to waste the life that he has spared.	
Sandra			One of the leaders of the Death Knights that serves under Mikael. She went under the alias of Jill when taking care of Ares' PTSD after the Youth Brigade and the Death Knights slaughtered the Temple Mercenaries. Gogh developed a slight crush on her. She gave Ares and Gogh Mikael's plans for keeping Ariadne and Ares out of the war, but Gogh lost it when bandits attacked. She's very skilled in battle, using a claw attached to a chain, like Baroona. She was the first one to hit Robin when he hit Mikael with an arrow, and she eventually killed him.	She was the last one to die when she tried to defend Mikaels dead body, being killed by Rikion.
No-Name Knights			An elite group of knights serving the Kingdom of Minos.	They were eliminated during an ambush battle with the Temple Mercenaries during the Minos Invasion Arc.
Kirberos, the Red-Eyed Swordsman		Chapter 15	He is infamous for killing other swordsmen and collecting their swords. He killed the Master Swordsman Kiron after Kiron had gone blind and took the right eye of his young apprentice, Ares. Although he is of mixed blood, his eyes are a "purer" red than full-blooded Red-Eyes. He is younger brother to the captain of the Black Knights, but he refuses to acknowledge his "weak" older brother. Kirberos fighting ability is so fearsome that none will claim bounty on him. The weapons of those he defeats he wears on his person and switches them out during battle. He currently has six swords in Chapter 204. The first two are swords that he uses at the same time, he is ambidextrous, are swords of high quality but are not unique in any other way. The second pair are sword, he ties together to form a weapon like Baroona's. The wire is not as strong as Baroona's wire based on the fact that Ares easily cuts through it. However the swords are so sharp they can also easily cut through Baroonas wire, although previous characters have failed to. His fifth sword is a bendy sword that he used to take Kiron's left eye. Ares nicknames it the Squid/Tentacle sword. It is used in the way that when a swordsman tries to block it with a sword, it will curve around the sword and stab them. It can be blocked by a long weapon, Ares counters it with a house lamp. The final sword, not yet shown in action is Ares' master's sword. It was the most recent sword that the Red-Eyed swordsman has gained.	He is killed by Ares.
Nicolai			Nicolai is one of Mikael's closest guards. Nikolai knows of Mikael's real intention towards Ares, Baroona, Gogh, and Robin. When Mikael sends his other elite guards including Carnival away, Nicolai and Sandra/Ray are told of Mikaels real plan. Nicolai has red eyes and fights with a light scythe. Nicolai's real intentions however were to move Ariadne and Helena away so they wouldn't get hurt by the war.	He is killed by Ares on a mission to kidnap Ares' girlfriend.
Rikion	appears to be 17–19 years old	Chapter 22	A young general from Silonica. He has a dark Mohawk and gold hoop earrings. His brash, provocative temperament puts him at odds with the Temple Mercenaries and Genesis, although Icarus tends to overlook this. Rikion's attempts to fight strong enemies are often usurped by Ares, Mikael and Baroona to comedic effect. He is, however, A very skilled and capable fighter. His troops respect him very much. They are very loyal to him, even turning around in the middle of a retreat to go back and rescue him, although sometimes they just cheer Rikion on without joining the fight themselves, much to his annoyance and disappointment. Rikion uses a weapon slightly similar to Baroona's, a sword connected to a chain.	

=== Groups of characters ===
- Main characters: Ares, Mikael, Baroona, Gogh, Emergency Food
- Chronos is the central nation in the geography of this story. Despite past conflict, it had enjoyed ten years of relative peace. However, the country's strength waned with the sanity and judgment of its king.
  - Temple Mercenaries is the most respected soldiers-for-hire operation in Chronos.
    - Ares, Mikael, Baroona and Gogh belong to the Temple Mercenaries, 4th Regiment, 2nd Squadron, Troop 3.
    - Douglas, One-Armed Jack, and Robin are also in the Temple Mercenaries.
    - Carnival was previously an A-Rank soldier for the Temple Mercenaries and their top fighter. He was known to be merciless and was kicked out for killing a comrade over a trivial matter.
  - Antonis is an admiral in Chronos' army.
  - Helena is the acknowledged strongest fighter in the port city of Nix.
  - Icarus was a young general who became the youngest king of Chronos.
  - Kiron is the Master Swordsman of Chronos.
  - Shion was previously a General of Chronos, but then went off to become a bandit lord.
  - Other people of Chronos include Ariadne, Genesis, Gizelle, Mickey, and Pig.
- Daraak: Daraakians include Cygnus and Sara.
- Isiris:
  - Mikael is heir to the throne of Isiris.
  - The tattoo on Baroona's back indicates his status as a former slave of Daraak.
  - Other people of Isiris include Kaiser and Sandra.
- Minos: the No-Name Knights are an elite group of knights serving the Kingdom of Minos.
- Red-Eyed Clan: Members of the Red-Eyed Clan have a natural fighting ability that exceeds that of normal men. They tried to live a pacifist life and declined to fight for a king. That king aggressively exterminated them directly and by offering bounties.
  - Kirberos is the Red-Eyed Swordsman. Although he is of mixed blood, his eyes are a "purer" red than full-blooded Red-Eyes.
  - Nicolai has red eyes.
- Silonica: Rikion is a young general from Silonica.
- Ares, Baroona, and Douglas lead the mercenaries.
- Sandra and Nikolai are the leaders of the Death Knights that serve under Mikael.

== Plot ==
Ares and Mikael are admitted to the Chronos based Temple Mercenaries after a test of skill against B-rank soldiers. Both pass easily and find themselves assigned to the same unit. Baroona and Gohue join them. Ares and Mikael wield swords, Baroona – another strong fighter – uses two linked daggers, and the cowardly artist Gohue provides comic relief. Their first taste of combat together is saving Jagsen village from bandits. Mikael and Baroona impress the officers and are promoted to B rank. There Ares connects with a young boy named Mickey whose family was killed by the bandits.

Next the Temple Mercenaries are hired by Chronosian general Icarus for a pre-emptive attack against neighboring country Minos in conjunction with their ally, Silonica. There, the four meet Ariadne, Ares's future girlfriend, and her bodyguard Helena. During the invasion, Ares protects Ariadne, winning the respect of the initially antagonistic Helena. Mikael and Baroona attract the attention of Icarus when Mikael defeats General Kentaro, a champion of Minos.

The battle strategies of Icarus win against Minos, and he is sent to negotiate with the Radnik Alliance, a consortium of countries at Chronos' western border. Icarus knows he is being sent to his death while rivals plot wresting power from the weak King. His own troops are detained on other duties, and he must travel with different escort. Icarus does not trust the replacement troops, and he hires Mikael and Baroona as personal bodyguards. Mikael and Baroona recommend Ares and Gohue as well. The leader of the Radnik alliance has red eyes, similar to a dark figure in Ares' past, and Ares confronts him. They survive this encounter, retreat, and Mikael, Baroona, and Ares defeat an ambush staged by the traitorous replacement troops. After revealing his past, Mikael and Baroona promise to help Ares with the Red-Eyed Swordsman.

They return to the Chronosian capital to find Icarus declared dead and usurpers persecuting those loyal to the old king and Icarus. Icarus stops the civil war with notably minimal losses. He declines then accepts the offered kingship of Chronos and turns his attention to the Radnik Alliance. He wins against their greater numbers with greater strategy and the further commission of Temple Mercenaries. Ares and Mikael pursue and defeat the red-eyed leader but discover he is older brother to the man Ares seeks – Kirberos, the man who killed Ares' master. Kirberos shows himself but only to taunt Ares to make himself "worthy to kill".

Soon afterwards, Mikael receives word from his family, and he resigns from Temple Mercenaries to return home. Ares, Baroona and Gohue give their comrade a fond farewell. As Mikael leaves he is replaced by Robin, the mute archer who befriended the group during the Radnik campaign.

Mikael is revealed to be the prince of rival country Isiris. With his father is on his deathbed, his uncle has started a coup. Mikael stops the coup, kills his uncle. Mikael then decides take over the world, with Chronos being the biggest obstacle. Mikael ruthlessly destroys the Temple Mercenaries' base killing the commander and the entire garrison, with the exception of Gohu and Ares. Robin, Baroona, and a handful of Temple Mercenaries return from a mission to find the destruction of their base. They, alongside Ares and Gohu rally to help assist King Icarus and the Chronosian army.

After a series of defeats and setbacks, Icarus fakes his death. He works in secret to form a united alliance of Silonica and members of the Radnik Alliance against Isiris. Mikael's forces suffers heavy losses due to over-dosing on the experimental drugs they use. Mikael quickly fills his ranks with raw recruits, mainly consisting of 10 year old youths with a week's worth of training. The newly united coalition eventually pushes the Isiris forces out of Chronos, when Icarus revealed himself. Mikael attempts to personally kill Icarus but is badly wounded by Robin, who disguised himself as an Isiris archer. Robin is immediately cut down and killed.

The coalition corners Mikael at his final stronghold. Ares is led to Mikael under the pretense of saving his girlfriend Ariadne, whom Mikael has kidnapped. As the two engage in a duel, it is revealed the Mikeal never kidnapped Ariadne. As the fight intensifies Mikeal suddenly lowers his guard allowing Ares to fatally wound him. Mikael tells Ares, that he never intended to kill Ares and wanted to die by his sword. Mikael states though initially, he had no regrets, he did regret choosing Ares to kill him. Mikael regretted the choice only after seeing Ares' crying face. After Mikael dies Ares, Baroona, and another surviving Temple Mercenary Douglas, defend Mikael's body from defilement and mutilation.

In a flashback it is seen Mikael went to great lengths to protect his friends. He constantly delayed his assault on the Temple Mercenary Base. He was hoping a mission would cause Ares, Gohu, Baroona, and Robin to leave the base, to keep them out of danger. When he found out only Robin and Baroona left, he had his best warrior secretly protect Ares, and trusted Gohu would find a good hiding spot. He also left his physician behind in disguise to nurse the two back to health. Mikael later sent out orders to capture Ares and Ariadne in order to remove them from the fighting and to keep them safe. In the present it is revealed that Mikael only kept three things in his personal treasury: his Temple Mercenary A rank helmet, his amulet, and a picture of him, Ares, and Baroona. Icarus and the remaining Temple Mercenaries are hailed as heroes, Ares in particular.

A year passes and Ares has left Ariadne and his friends without saying goodbye. He hunts Kirberos. Ares eventually finds him, and with the help of a disguised Baroona and the spirit of Mikael, Ares kills Kirberos. This fulfills the promise the three of them made, years prior. Ares and Baroona collect the reward money and return home. Ares reunites with Ariadne and together with Baroona and Gohu they rebuild the Temple Mercenaries. The story ends almost exactly as it began, with Mickey joining Commander Ares' reformed Temple Mercenaries.

== Media ==
=== Manhwa ===
The completed manhwa is 26 volumes originally published from 2001 to 2007 by Team Mania and BB Comics.
