= Anarchism in Denmark =

Anarchism in Denmark emerged in the late 19th century from the revolutionary factions of early social democratic spheres, crystallizing into a widespread anarcho-syndicalist movement that reached its height during the late 1910s. After the disintegration of organized syndicalism, anarchists in post-war Denmark began to organize the squatters' movement, which led to the creation of Freetown Christiania.

== History ==
=== Beginnings ===
Libertarian socialism first emerged in Denmark during debates within the Social Democratic Party over reformism and revolutionary socialism. Whereas the old reformist leadership advocated for an authoritarian socialism, inspired by Marxism, the younger revolutionary section took a stance against authoritarianism and bureaucracy. The revolutionaries published Arbejderen, in which they criticized the party's tactics of parliamentarism, as well as the alliance between the reformist Social Democrats and the Liberal Party against the Conservative government of Jacob Brønnum Scavenius Estrup. In a public meeting, the reformist leader Chresten Hørdum said on the matter:

"In heaven's name let the revolutionists make as much opposition as they please in their own groups. They have nothing to do with our meetings and bad better take care they are not chucked out so fine a day. Let this sort of thing go on, and Anarchism, in its serious sense, will soon make its appearance in the capital of Denmark."

The reformist party leadership subsequently began to repress the internal revolutionary opposition, led by Gerson Trier, which was expelled from the party on November 7, 1890. So the revolutionary section went on to found the Revolutionary Socialist Workers' Party. Anarchist sympathies began to grow among a few select individuals in Denmark, some of whom were responsible for translating the works of Peter Kropotkin into the Danish language.

=== Early 20th century ===
At the turn of the 20th century, anarcho-syndicalism began to emerge from the revolutionary section of the social democratic movement. Syndicalist organizations such as the Syndicalist League, Trade Union Opposition Association and Young Socialist League were established and began to publish newspapers such as Solidaritet and Den Røde Krig. By the time of World War I, anarchism and syndicalism played a key role in the Danish labor movement and the struggle for the conditions of the unemployed. This culminated in 1918, when anarcho-syndicalists held a number of unemployment demonstrations that culminated in the storm on the Stock Exchange, when unemployed syndicalists attacked Børsen in Copenhagen. After the storm, syndicalists established the Organization of the Unemployed and held further demonstrations against unemployment in Copenhagen, as the movement continued to grow, playing a prominent role in achieving the eight-hour day.

But as the employing class began to launch a counter-offensive against the syndicalists and following the failure of the majority of the revolutions of 1917–1923, the anarcho-syndicalist movement went into decline. The Trade Union Opposition Association was disestablished in 1921, with the majority forming part of an alliance with the Communist Party of Denmark, while the minority organized themselves into the Syndicalist Propaganda Alliance. Christian Christensen eventually broke from the Communist Party and attempted to revive the syndicalist movement. The syndicalist weekly periodical Arbejdet was established, which Christensen, Carl Heinrich Petersen and Halfdan Rasmussen participated in, but the newspaper ceased publication in 1938.

During the Nazi occupation of Denmark in World War II, syndicalists such as Petersen and Rasmussen participated in the Danish resistance movement, clandestinely publishing anti-fascist propaganda and forming insurgent groups to commit acts of sabotage.

=== Post World War II ===
In the 1960s, Danish anarchists began to participate in the creation of freespaces, as part of the nascent squatting movement. The most significant act of which was the establishment of Freetown Christiania in an abandoned army barracks of Copenhagen in 1971, beginning an anarchist project to create a self-governing society. This catalyzed decades of activity in the squatters movement, with squats that followed in its wake including the Ungdomshuset, BumZen and Børnehuset. This rise in the squatting activity eventually culminated in the Battle of Ryesgade, during which squatters clashed with the police that were enforcing an eviction notice.

In 2009, the anarchist organization Libertære Socialister was established, forming a federation from a number of groups throughout Denmark and carrying out a number of protest actions throughout the 2010s before being dissolved in 2017.

== See also ==
- Category:Danish anarchists
- List of anarchist movements by region
- Anarchism in Germany
- Anarchism in Norway
- Anarchism in Sweden
- Liberalism and radicalism in Denmark
- Else Christensen
