= Thomas Hylland Eriksen =

Norwegian anthropologist (1962–2024)

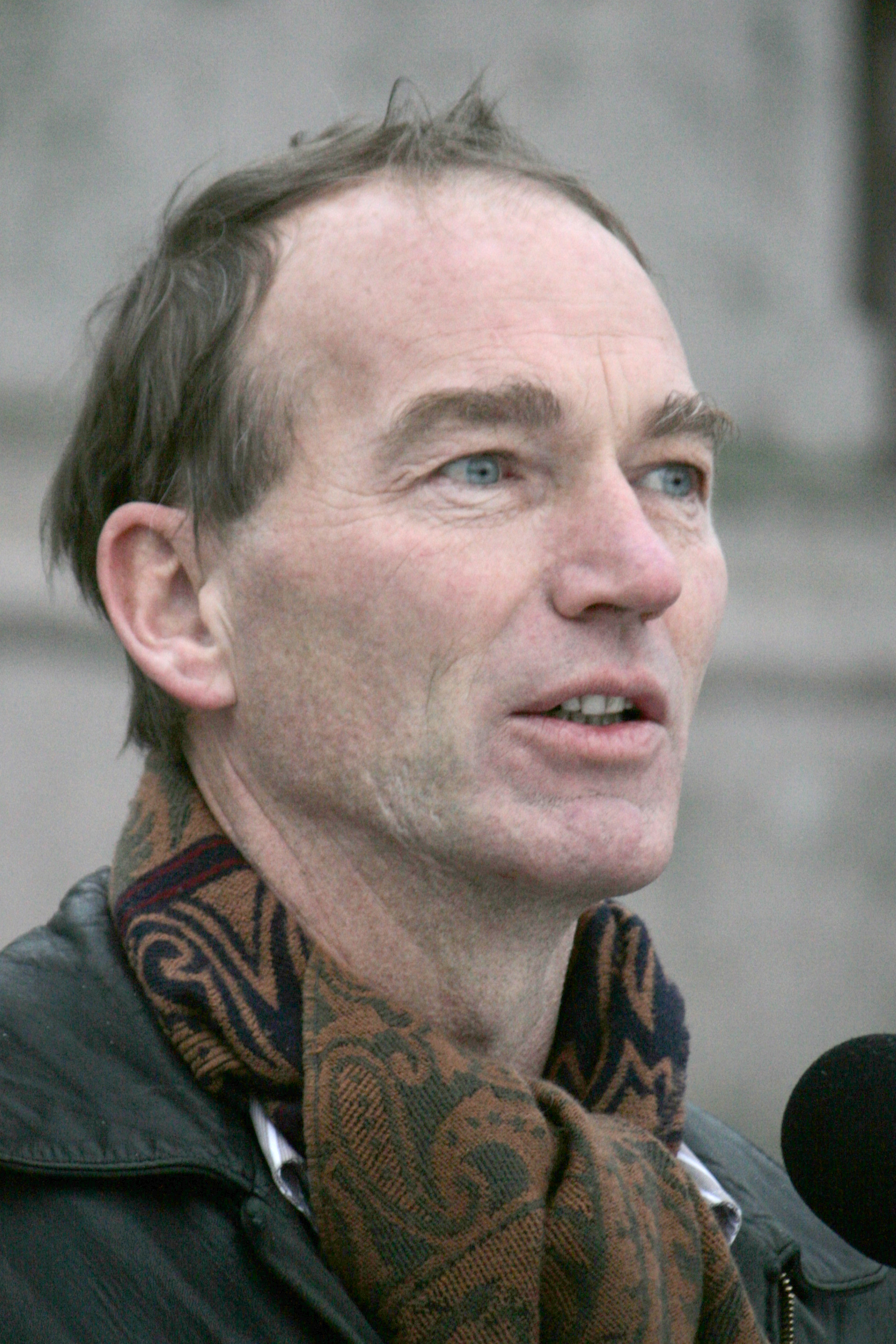
- Thomas Hylland Eriksen in 2011
- Born: Geir Thomas Hylland Eriksen; 6 February 1962; Oslo, Norway
- Died: 27 November 2024 (aged 62); Oslo, Norway
- Spouse: Kari J. Spjeldnæs

Academic background
- Education: University of Oslo (cand.polit); University of Oslo (dr.polit)
- Thesis: Ethnicity and Two Nationalisms: Social Classifications and the Power of Ideology in Trinidad and Mauritius (1991)
- Doctoral advisor: Axel Sommerfelt

Academic work
- Discipline: Anthropology
- Institutions: University of Oslo

Geir Thomas Hylland Eriksen (6 February 1962 – 27 November 2024) was a Norwegian anthropologist known for his scholarly and popular writing on globalization, culture, identity, ethnicity, and nationalism. He was Professor of Social Anthropology in the Department of Social Anthropology at the University of Oslo. He has previously served as the President of the European Association of Social Anthropologists (2015–2016), as well as the Editor of Samtiden (1993–2001), Norsk antropologisk tidsskrift (1993–1997), the Journal of Peace Research, and Ethnos. He was an honorary member of the Royal Anthropological Institute and an external scientific member of the Max Planck Society.

Hylland Eriksen was among the most prolific and highly cited anthropologists of his generation—at the time of his death, he had authored or co-authored approximately sixty book and hundreds of articles, essays, and book chapters. He was recognized for his remarkable success in bringing an anthropological perspective to a broader, non-academic audience. In Norway, Hylland Eriksen was a well-known public intellectual whose advocacy of diversity and cultural pluralism earned both praise and scorn. Right-wing terrorist Anders Behring Breivik, perpetrator of the 2011 Norway attacks, cited Eriksen critically in his manifesto and during his 2012 trial.

In academia and beyond, Hylland Eriksen was highly decorated for his scholarship. He was the recipient of honorary degrees from Stockholm University (2011), the University of Copenhagen (2021), and Charles University in Prague (2021), as well as one of anthropology's most prestigious honors, the Swedish Society for Anthropology and Geography's Gold Medal (2022). He was a member of the Norwegian Academy of Science and Letters.

== Early life and education ==
Hylland Eriksen was born on 6 February 1962 in Oslo. His parents were Ole Eriksen (1934–1979), a journalist, and Gerd Elisabeth Hylland (1935–2018), a teacher. The family moved to Nøtterøy when Ole Eriksen took a job in Tønsberg. Eriksen grew up in an intellectual environment, though he found Nøtterøy to be a conformist place and felt that he never had deep roots there. He was exposed to the wider world in part through traveling to Africa in connection with his father's work with UNESCO. During his youth, he was active in the Young Liberals and Grønt Gras, a student environmental organization, and later remembered that as a young teenager his heroes were Alice Cooper and Charles Darwin. In anticipation of pursuing higher education, he took the examen artium in 1980.

Hylland Eriksen matriculated at the University of Oslo in 1981 and studied philosophy, sociology, and social anthropology. He completed his undergraduate studies and graduated with a cand. mag. degree in 1984. He remained at Blindern to pursue a graduate degree in social anthropology.

During this period, Hylland Eriksen was also active in Oslo's anarchist milieu. From 1982 to 1988, he was a member of the editorial board for Gateavisa, a radical counter-cultural publication founded in 1970 by the anarchist collective at Hjelmsgate 3. Eriksen was among Gateavisa's most prolific writers, penning many of its articles under variations of his name, including "Thomas Hylland" and "Geir Hylland." In the late 1980s, he proposed that the publication be rechristened "Glasnost", which it was for 1987–1988.

At Blindern, Hylland Eriksen's interests coalesced around questions of identity, ethnicity, and nationalism—themes he would explore ethnographically through fieldwork in Mauritius in 1986. He completed his cand.polit in 1987 with a thesis—published in 1988 as a book—on multi-ethnic nationalism called Communicating Cultural Difference and Identity: Ethnicity and Nationalism in Mauritius. In 1989, Eriksen completed additional fieldwork in Trinidad. Two years later, he defended his dissertation, Ethnicity and Two Nationalisms: Social Classifications and the Power of Ideology in Trinidad and Mauritius, and received his dr.polit.

== Career ==
=== Early academic career ===
From 1990 to 1991, Hylland Eriksen was a research fellow at the Peace Research Institute Oslo. In 1991, he accepted a position as a Førsteamanuensis (equivalent to an Associate Professorship) in the department at the University of Oslo where he had completed his graduate studies. He published at a prodigious rate in both English and Norwegian on nationalism and identity in Trinidad and Mauritius, as well as culture and cultural diversity in contemporary Norway. In 1992, Hylland Eriksen was approached by Universitetsforlaget, a Norwegian academic publisher, about writing an introductory textbook for social anthropology students. The result, which appeared in 1993, was Små steder, store spørsmål—a text that in various languages (in English, Small Places, Large Issues) and through many editions has become one of the world's most widely-used introductions to anthropology and has been translated into thirty languages.

1993 was also the year that Hylland Eriksen published Ethnicity and Nationalism: Anthropological Perspectives. Written at the invitation of Richard Ashby Wilson, series editor at Pluto Press, the book has, like Small Places, Large Issues, passed through various editions and found a broad readership. It is Eriksen's most-cited work.

Eriksen was promoted to Professor in 1995.

=== CULCOM and the Alna Project ===
Hylland Eriksen's interest in diversity and new patterns of cultural inclusion and exclusion would lead to his involvement in an award-winning, multi-year interdisciplinary initiative at the University of Oslo, Cultural Complexity in the new Norway (CULCOM). Hylland Eriksen served as CULCOM's Director from 2004 to its conclusion in 2010. During that time, CULCOM would bring together 120 people from five of the University of Oslo's faculties, and lead directly to the completion of 9 PhDs and 42 MAs, as well as several books and academic journal articles. Hylland Eriksen himself was directly involved with five of these CULCOM was awarded the University of Oslo's Research Communication Prize in 2010.

Though CULCOM ended in 2010, it continued in a sense through a research project it helped launch—The Alna Project—in 2009. Funded by the Research Council of Norway, Hylland Eriksen and the Alna Project's interdisciplinary team, including journalist Elisabeth Eide, studied integration and belonging in Alna, a highly-diverse "satellite city" in Oslo's Grorud Valley. The project concluded in 2013.

=== Overheating ===
In 2015, Hylland Eriksen launched Overheating: The Three Crises of Globalization, a major project funded by the European Research Council. Focusing on environmental, economic, and cultural crises, Hylland Eriksen and his team conducted ethnographic fieldwork in various countries, including Australia, Peru, the Philippines, South Korea, Sierra Leone, Canada, the United Kingdom, Hungary, and Norway. In 2017, Hylland Eriksen received the University of Oslo Research Prize for his work on Overheating.

== Politics ==
Hylland Eriksen was on at least one occasion a minor political candidate for the Norwegian Liberal Party. In the local election of 2011 and general election of 2013, he was a minor candidate for the Norwegian Green Party in Oslo.

== Personal life ==
In 1995, Hylland Eriksen married Kari J. Spjeldnæs, a former publishing director at Aschehoug who was an academic at Kristiania University College. Together, they had two children.

Beyond the university, Hylland Eriksen was a musician who played guitar and later saxophone, with tastes ranging across progressive rock, classical music, and jazz. He played saxophone for the Gentle Knife, a Norwegian prog rock band. He also authored two novels.

== Illness and death ==
In 2016, Hylland Eriksen was diagnosed with pancreatic cancer. He was open about his illness in subsequent years, reflecting on his circumstances at length in a 2021 book, Syv meninger med livet (English: Seven Meanings of Life: The Threads that Connect). He continued to research, write, and participate in public debate through years of surgery and treatment. He died on 27 November 2024 at the age of 62.

== Legacy ==
Hylland Eriksen occupied an unusual position in contemporary anthropology: a theoretical scholar who became a highly-visible public intellectual. In Norway, where he was a dominant voice in debates over immigration, multiculturalism, and national identity for more than two decades, he attained a degree popular recognition. Internationally, his two textbooks—Ethnicity and Nationalism and Small Places, Large Issues—and theoretical works found broad, interdisciplinary audiences.

== Works ==
=== Main works in English ===
- Us and Them in Modern Societies (1992)
- Ethnicity And Nationalism (1993, 3rd edition 2010) Widely translated
- Small Places, Large Issues: An Introduction to Social and Cultural Anthropology (1995, 5th edition 2022) Widely translated
- Common Denominators: Ethnicity, Nationalism and the Politics of Compromise in Mauritius (1998)
- A History Of Anthropology (2001, with F. S. Nielsen, 2nd edition 2013) Translated into Portuguese, Arabic, Norwegian, Swedish
- Tyranny of the Moment: Fast and Slow Time in the Information Age (2001) Translated into more than 25 languages.
- Globalisation: Studies in Anthropology (2003, ed.)
- What Is Anthropology? (2004) Widely translated
- Engaging Anthropology: The Case For A Public Presence (2006)
- Globalization: The Key Concepts (2007, 2nd edition 2014)
- Flag, Nation and Identity in Europe and America (2007, ed. w/Richard Jenkins)
- Paradoxes of Cultural Recognition (2009, ed. w/Halleh Ghorashi and Sharam Alghasi)
- A World of Insecurity (2010, ed. w/Ellen Bal and Oscar Salemink)
- Anthropology now and next: Essays in honor of Ulf Hannerz (edited with Christina Garsten and Shalini Randeria, 2014)
- Fredrik Barth: An Intellectual Biography (2015)
- Overheating: An Anthropology of Accelerated Change (2016)
- Identities Destabilised: Living in an Overheated World (edited with Elisabeth Schober, 2016)
- Knowledge and Power in an Overheated World (edited with Elisabeth Schober, 2017). Free e-book, downloadable here.
- An Overheated World: An Anthropological History of the Early Twenty-First Century (editor, 2018)
- Boomtown: Runaway Globalisation on the Queensland Coast (2018)
- The Mauritian Paradox: Fifty Years of Development, Democracy and Diversity (editor with Ramola Ramtohul, 2018)
- Mining Encounters (edited with Robert Pijpers, 2018)
- Ethnic Groups and Boundaries Today: A Legacy of Fifty Years (editor with Marek Jakoubek, 2019)
- Knowing from the Indigenous North: Sami Approaches to History, Politics and Belonging (edited with Jarno Valkonen and Sanna Valkonen)
- Identità instabili. Vivere in una società incandescente (with Martina Visentin, 2019).
- Climate, Capitalism and Communities: An Anthropology of Environmental Overheating (edited with Astrid Stensrud, 2019)
- Cooling Down: Local Responses to Global Climate Change (editor with Susanna M. Hoffman and Paulo Mendes, 2021)
- Acceleration and Cultural Change Dialogues from an Overheated World (with Martina Visentin, 2023) Open access book, downloadable here
- Book Bottom: The Story of Robert Wyatt's Rock Bottom (with Øivind Hånes), 2024

=== In Norwegian ===
- 1989: Hvor mange hvite elefanter? Kulturdimensjonen i bistandsarbeidet (editor) ISBN 82-417-0019-9
- 1991: Veien til et mer eksotisk Norge: En bok om nordmenn og andre underlige folkeslag. ISBN 82-417-0094-6
- 1993: Typisk norsk: essays om kulturen i Norge ISBN 82-7003-121-6
- 1993: Små steder – store spørsmål. Innføring i sosialantropologi
- 1993: Kulturterrorismen: Et oppgjør med tanken om kulturell renhet ISBN 82-430-0151-4
- 1994: Kulturelle veikryss. Essays om kreolisering om kulturblanding ISBN 8200039358
- 1994: Kulturforskjeller i praksis (with Torunn Arntsen Sajjad) (7 revised editions, last in 2019)
- 1995: Det nye fiendebildet Updated and extended version 2001: Bak fiendebildet.
- 1996: Kampen om fortiden (originally in Swedish: Historia, myt och identitet)
- 1997: Charles Darwin, ISBN 8205253056
- 1997: Flerkulturell forståelse (editor), ISBN 8251835755
- 1999: Egoisme (with Dag O. Hessen), ISBN 82-03-22388-5
- 1999: Ambivalens og fundamentalisme (editor with Oscar Hemer)
- 2001: Øyeblikkets tyranni. Rask og langsom tid i informasjonsalderen, ISBN 82-03-22821-6
- 2002: Til verdens ende og tilbake: antropologiens historie (with Finn Sivert Nielsen), ISBN 82-7674-291-2
- 2004: Hva er sosialantropologi, 150-siders lyninnføring i faget. ISBN 82-15-00495-4
- 2004: Røtter og føtter: identitet i en omskiftelig tid om historie og identitet ISBN 82-525-5182-3
- 2005: Internett i praksis : om teknologiens uregjerlighet (editor) ISBN 82-304-0005-9
- 2005: Menneske og samfunn: samfunnskunnskap, sosiologi, sosialantropologi (with Erik Sølvberg and Hans Arne Kjelsaas), ISBN 82-03-33300-1
- 2006: Kosmopolitikk (with Halvor Finess Tretvoll) ISBN 82-02-26565-7
- 2006: Normalitet (editor with Jan-Kåre Breivik)
- 2006: Trygghet (editor)
- 2007: Frihet (editor with Arne Johan Vetlesen)
- 2007: Grenser for kultur? (editor with Øivind Fuglerud)
- 2008: Storeulvsyndromet: Jakten på lykken i overflodssamfunnet, ISBN 978-8-20329-126-5
- 2008: Globalisering: Åtte nøkkelbegreper
- 2010: Samfunn
- 2010: Kulturell kompleksitet i det nye Norge (editor with Hans Erik Næss), ISBN 978-8-27477-528-2
- 2011: Søppel: Avfall i en verden av bivirkninger
- 2012: På stedet løp: Konkurransens paradokser (with Dag O. Hessen)
- 2012: Den globale drabantbyen (editor with Sharam Alghasi and Elisabeth Eide). ISBN 978-8-20238-655-9
- 2013: Fredrik Barth: En intellektuell biografi, ISBN 978-8-21502-232-1
- 2021: Appenes planet: Hvordan smarttelefonen forandret verden
- 2022: Moose Loose: Elgen er løs
- 2023: Syv meninger med livet.
- 2024 Book Bottom: Historien om Robert Wyatts Rock Bottom (med Øivind Hånes)
- 2024: Det umistelige: Global ensretting og det nye mangfoldet.
