= Squatting in Norway =

Norway on the globe

Squatting in Norway is taking possession of land or an empty house without the permission of the owner. The first public occupation was Hjelmsgate 3 in 1969 and self-managed social centres which were first squatted and then legalized include the Blitz House, Hausmania and UFFA. Brakkebygrenda was a land squat which has twice been evicted.

== History ==
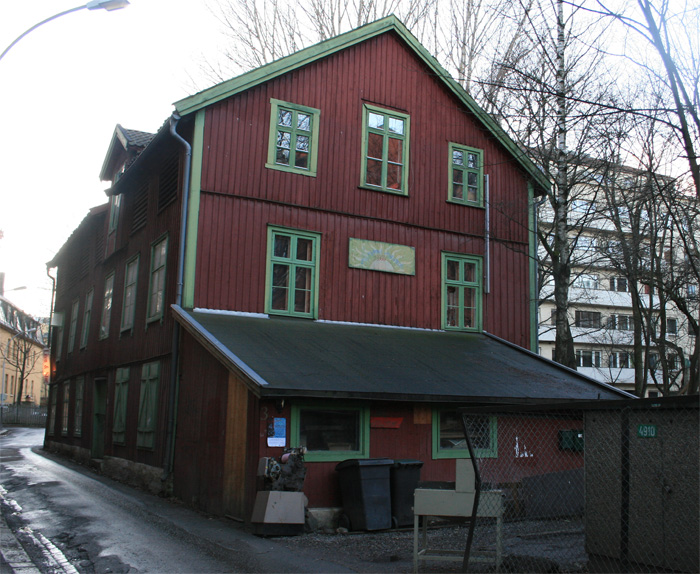
Hjelmsgate 3 in 2008

In Oslo, the capital of Norway, the first public occupation was Hjelmsgate 3 in 1969. It was quickly legalized and became a base for anarchism and countercultural activities. In the 1980s, buildings were occupied by a radical left-wing movement which had links to Denmark and Sweden. Most famously, houses on Skippergata were squatted and then after eviction, the Blitz House was occupied at Pilestredet 30. Blitz is a self-managed social centre which hosts radiOrakel (a feminist radio station), a bookshop, a music venue and a vegan café.

Hausmania is a complex of buildings in Oslo that has been squatted from 1999 onwards. The cultural centre at Hausmannsgate 34 has a cinema, galleries, a vegan café and a theatre. Hausmannsgate 34 was evicted in 2016 and 11 people were arrested. Brakkebygrenda was also occupied in 1999. It was a land squat where people lived in caravans and motorhomes, which has been evicted twice. The eviction in 2008 was resisted by between 30 and 40 squatters throwing projectiles, and a caravan was set on fire. In 2014, the site was evicted again in a large police operation, which closed nearby roads. Property developers Urbanium, who bought property on the Hausmania site, were reported by Klassekampen to have been involved in the eviction of Brakkebygrenda.

In Trondheim, the self-managed social centre UFFA was created in 1981. After the original building was burnt down, the centre moved to its present location. It houses a bookshop, a cafe, a concert space and offices for the anarchist newspaper Folk & Røvere. Blitz, Hausmania and UFFA are all centres for anarchism in Norway.
