= UFFA =

Anarchist youth house in Trondheim, Norway

- Ungdom For Fri Aktivitet
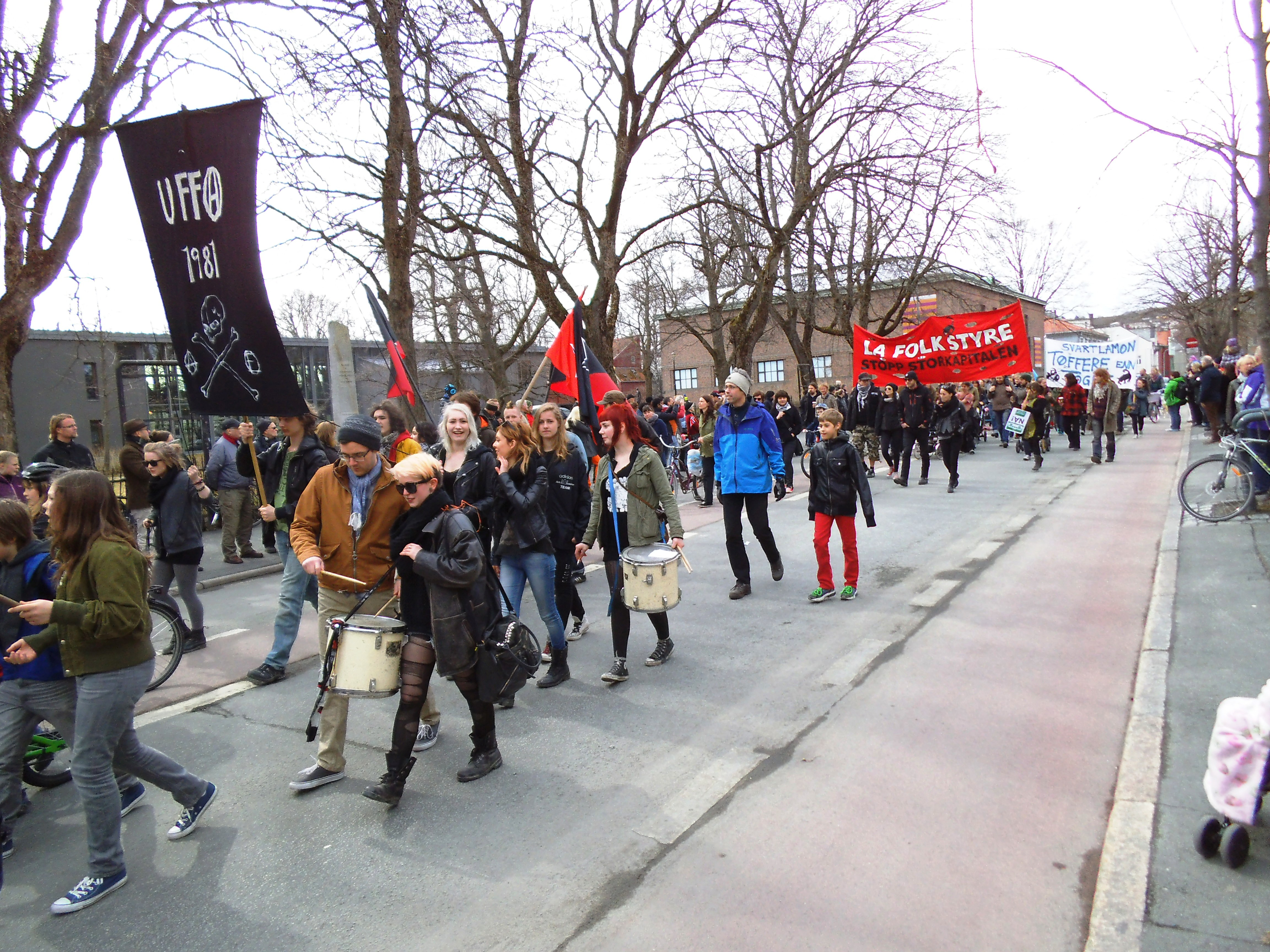
- An UFFA banner on a 1 May demonstration, 2013
- Interactive map of UFFA
- Address: Innherredsveien 69C, 7043; Trondheim
- Coordinates: 63.4364°N 10.4300°E

Construction
- Opened: 1981
- Years active: 1981–

UFFA (Norwegian: Ungdom for fri aktivitet; English: Youth for free activity) is an anarchist youth house in Trondheim, Norway. The self-managed social centre provides a location for concerts and self-organised activities such as an infoshop at the Ivar Matlaus Bokkafé, a hacklab and an anarchist newspaper. Squatted in 1981, it moved to its present location the following year. The centre was burnt down in 2010 and then rebuilt.

== History ==
UFFA was established in 1981, coming out of an autonomous squatters movement which also created the Blitz house in Oslo. The DumDum Boys, then known as Wannskrækk, played at the opening concert and later Tre Små Kinesere first recorded at UFFA. It was established as a self-managed social centre and founding members talked about how in the 1980s there was nothing else for young people to do in Trondheim. In 2006, a book was published charting the history of the project on its 25th anniversary.

The original location in Kjøpmannsgata burned down in 1982. UFFA signed an agreement with Trondheim municipality and resumed activities shortly afterwards at Innherredsveien (taking over the defunct Østbyen kindergarten). The centre was burnt down again in 2010, just before the New Year. UFFA activists successfully campaigned for the city council to build a new centre at the same location.

In December 2006 people from both UFFA and Blitz participated in the demonstrations supporting their compatriots from Ungdomshuset in Copenhagen, and several were arrested. Protestors from Svartlamon blocked traffic and the demonstration picketed the Danish Consulate. Generally, UFFA has had less conflict with the authorities than its sister projects Blitz and Ungdomshuset. Alongside Blitz and also Hausmania, UFFA is a centre for anarchism in Norway.

== Activities ==
At UFFA there is the Ivar Matlaus Bokkafé (an infoshop and cafe), Kafe Knaillhard (a vegetarian restaurant), a hacklab, the concert room and various activity groups. The café is named after the anarchist Ivar Mortensson-Egnund, who among other things, lectured the Norwegian people about politics, religion and social issues. One of the lectures he held was named (Matløysa i Noreg" ("Foodless in Norway") and after this lecture he was called "Ivar Matlaus" ("Foodless Ivar"). The anarchist newspaper Folk & Røvere is published from the centre.

== See also ==
- Freetown Christiania in Copenhagen
- Hausmania in Oslo
- Kafé 44 in Stockholm
- Ungdomshuset in Copenhagen
- Anarchism in Norway
