= Svartlamon =

Area of Trondheim, Norway

Coordinates: 63°26′18″N 10°25′20″E

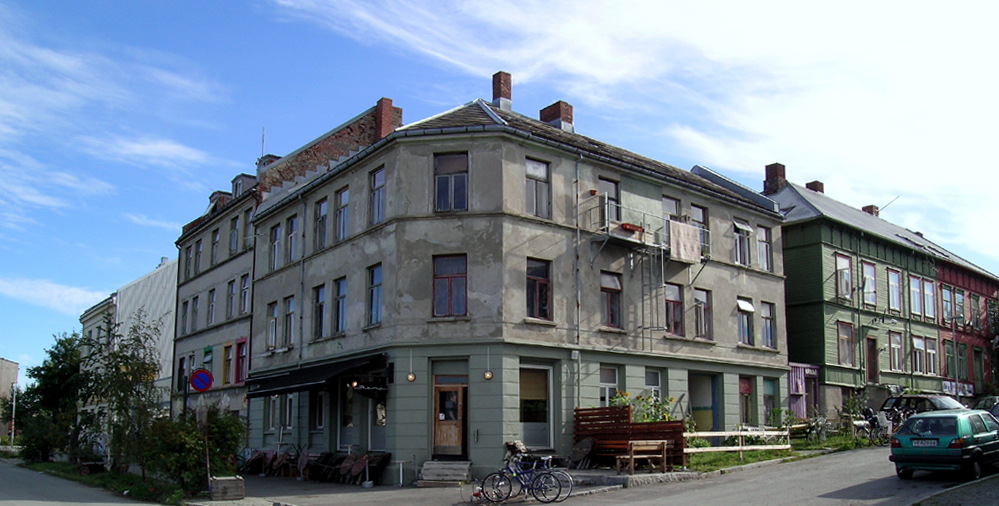

Svartlamon is an alternative district that describes itself as "a gathering of houses in a little place called Lademoen north east of the center of Trondheim, a city in Norway". Most of the houses were built at the end of the 19th century or the beginning of the 20th century. Svartlamon is a result of many years of political struggle.

Svartlamon shares characteristics with a number of anarchist, communist and socialist communities in Scandinavia, such as Blitz and Hausmania in Oslo.

== See also ==
- Anarchism in Norway
