= Bat Wings =

1992 film

- Album Cover for soundtrack.
- Directed by: Emil Stang Lund
- Written by: Hans E. Kinck; Emil Stang Lund
- Produced by: Egil Ødegård
- Starring: Lars Øyno
- Cinematography: Paul René Roestad
- Music by: Randall Meyers
- Production company: Oslo Film
- Release date: 10 September 1992
- Running time: 80 minutes
- Country: Norway
- Language: Norwegian

Bat Wings (Norwegian: Flaggermusvinger) is a 1992 Norwegian drama film directed by Emil Stang Lund. It was entered into the 18th Moscow International Film Festival where it won the Diploma for Direction.

The film features three sections, called Episodes, based upon (and named after) the short stories written by Hans E. Kinck, which explore the connection between man, nature, and the human mind. The stories explore themes of guilt, passion and fear.

== Cast ==
Episode 1: Den nye kapellanen (The New Chaplain)

- Frank C. Bjørnsen as Den nye kapp
- Jon Eikemo as Jon Vassenden
- Knut Mikal Instanes as Vetle-Ola

Episode 2: Hvitsymre i utslaatten (Windflower in the Outcast)

- Hildegun Riise as Gertrud
- Tina Hartvig as Den lyskledte
- Roar Kjølv Jenssen as Prestesønn

Episode 3: Felen i ville skogen (The Fiddler in the Wild Forest)

- Lars Øyno as Torstein
- Liv Heløe as Taterjenta
- Sine Butenschøn as Farmoren
- Ricky Danielsson as Dvergen

== Synopses ==
=== Den nye kapellanen ===
Originally produced as a short film in 1988, Jon Eikemo plays Jon Vassenden, the father of an isolated family who is morbidly curious about passerby on his small farm. The New Chaplain won the Amanda Award.

=== Hvitsymre i utslaatten ===
Originally produced as a short film in 1990, Hildegun Riise plays Gertrud, who is having an affair with an engaged priest's son.

=== Felen i ville skogen ===
The longest episode, The Fiddler in the Wild Forest was produced specifically for Bat Wings. Lars Øyno plays Torstein, who releases his anxiety through fiddle playing and shouting in the forest.

== See also ==
- Hans E. Kinck
