= Lars Øyno =

Norwegian actor, director and playwright (born 1955)

Lars Øyno (born 1 August 1955) is a Norwegian actor, director and playwright who lives and works in Oslo.

He was educated at the National Academy of Theater 1981-1984. He worked as an actor at the Trøndelag Teater 1984-1992.

Øyno has portrayed his countryman Knut Hamsun in the eponymous Norwegian mini-series. He also participated in movies such as Bat Wings and O' Horten.

From 1992 Øyno has managed the underground theatre Grusomhetens Teater (= Theatre of Cruelty), now situated at Hausmania in Oslo. His theatrical ideology is inspired by the visions of Antonin Artaud.

Performances he has created and directed at Grusomhetens Teater include:

- Revolutionary Messages (2013)
- Amazonas (2011)
- What a Glorious Day! An hommage to Bendik Riis (2011)
- Last Song (2009)
- Mountain Bird (2009)
- Theatre and Science (2007)
- The Ugly Duckling (2006)
- The Spurt of Blood (2005)
- The Gospel according to Thomas (2004)
- The Dollhouse (2003)
- Peer Gynt (2002)
- Alaska (2001)
- Poetries (2000)
- Black Sun (1999)
- The Philosopher's Stone (1997)
- Woyzeck (1996)
- Storyteller (1995)
- The Road to Heaven (1995)
- The World of Jotner (1994)
- To Have Dealt With the Judgement of God (1993)
- Peace (1992)
- For dagene er onde (1991)
- Elagabal (Trøndelag Teater, 1989)
