= RadiOrakel =

Norwegian feminist radio station

radiOrakel
- Company type: Radio station
- Industry: Broadcasting
- Founded: 1982
- Headquarters: Oslo, Norway
- Products: Radio, online services
- Number of employees: Ca. 100 volunteers
- Website: www.radiorakel.no

radiOrakel (lit. Radio Oracle) is a feminist radio station in Oslo, Norway, broadcasting on 99,3 MHz in the Oslo area and through Internet streaming. Based at the Blitz House, it is widely believed to be the world's first feminist radio station. radiOrakel promotes an inclusive, intersectional feminism, and has said that "radiOrakel believes that feminism should be for everyone" and that "we believe that feminism must be inclusive in order to be progressive and continue to set the agenda for the societal development we want. Equality and inclusion must have room for everyone, regardless of gender, sexual orientation, work or beliefs." radiOrakel is open to all feminists regardless of gender or sexual orientation. The radio station is however known for prioritizing music by women and queer people. radiOrakel maintains a close association with the Initiative for Inclusive Feminism and was among the signatories of a 2025 call for an inclusive feminism with around 30 other Norwegian organizations.

== History ==
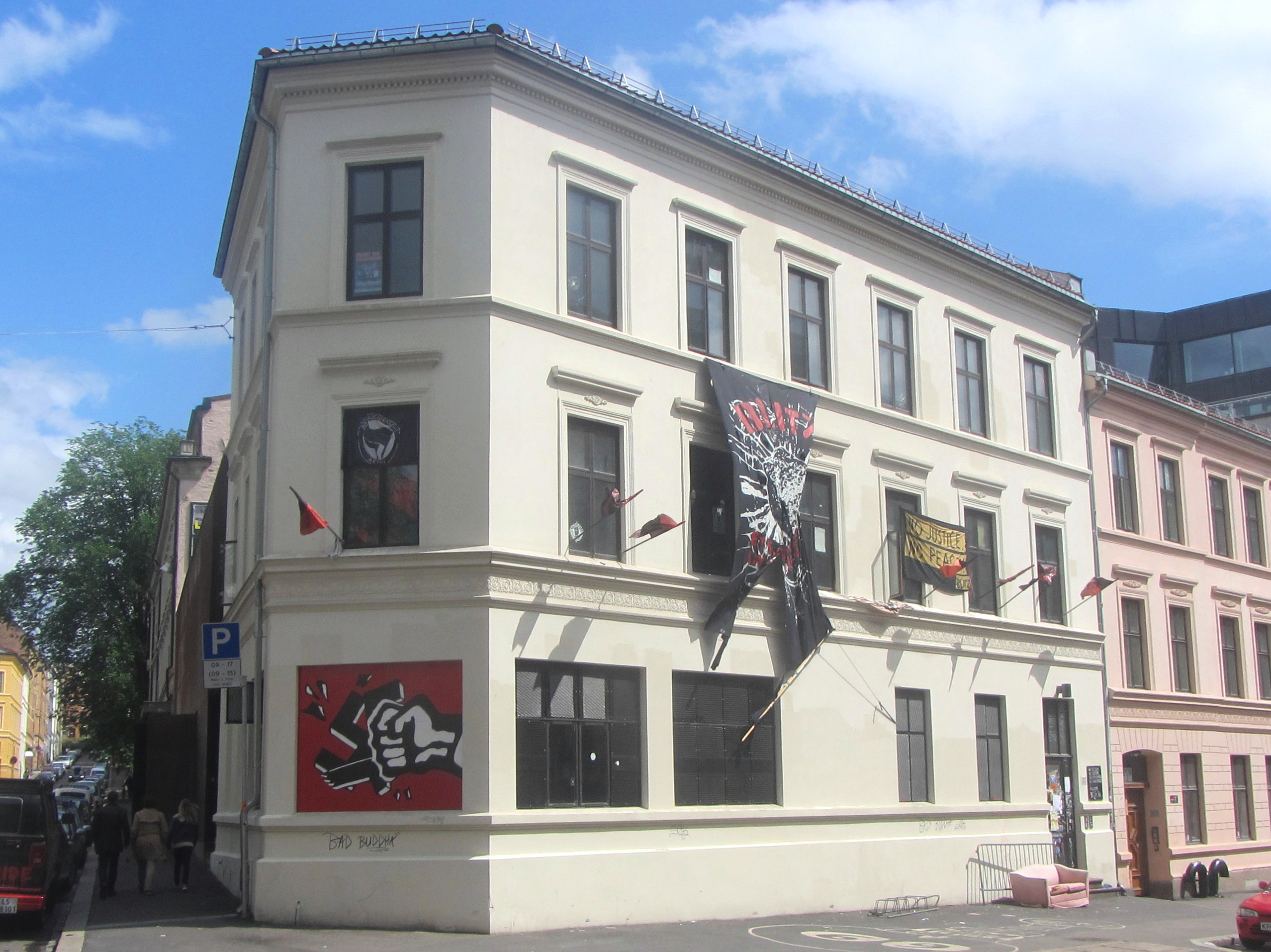
radiOrakel occupies the third floor and loft of the Blitz House in Oslo. Pictured in 2012.

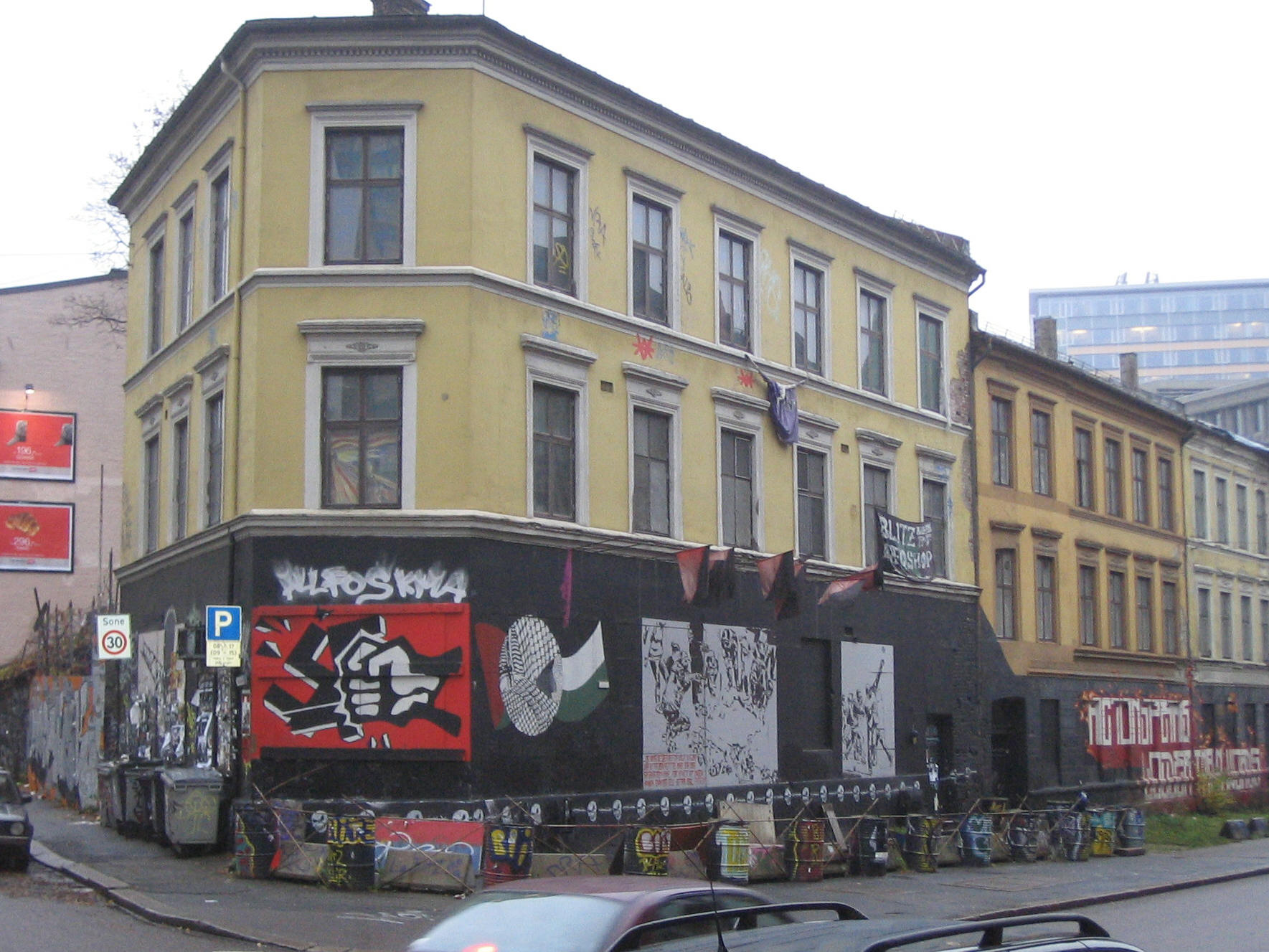
The Blitz House pictured in 2005, before the building was renovated.

It was started in 1982, when Norwegian authorities decided to allow local radio stations to operate. Money was then collected at a women’s cultural festival to start up the world’s first women’s radio station. On October 16, 1982, radiOrakel was founded. From the beginning, it was a part-time station, sharing a frequency. Gradually the station has been able to gain more time from the regulator. It now broadcasts 10 or 11 hours a day. Rita Westvik was the first editor in chief.

Most of the radio station's journalists are volunteers. The station has around hundred volunteers at any given time. The management (editor-in-chief and executive director) is elected annually. In the early days the station’s headquarters were at Korsgata 5; it later moved together with AKKS (Aksjon Kvinne Kultur Senter — Women’s Cultural Action Centre) to the loft at the Blitz House, where it today occupies the third floor and the loft. While Blitz House is well known as a centre for anarchism in Norway, radiOrakel itself has an intersectional feminist political platform, and many of the station's journalists are not anarchists or necessarily involved with ofter left-wing causes. Nevertheless the station has a friendly relationship with the Blitz community, as a result of sharing the Blitz House, and is generally seen as a left-wing radio station.

radiOrakel is one of the oldest local radio stations in Norway and uses the title of the world’s oldest women’s radio station. The aim of the radio station is to educate women and queer people within the field of radio journalism and sound engineering, and at any time having a membership made up of at least 2/3 women or queer people. What this also means in practice is that radiOrakel actively prioritizes and promotes women and queer people as both interviewer and interview subject, as well as having a music profile that has at least 50% of all music by women or queer musicians and artists. However, radiOrakel is open to all feminists regardless of gender or sexual orientation. radiOrakel has between 50,000 and 70,000 documented listeners (1998). People of all genders listens to radiOrakel. Research suggests that listening audiences are between the age of 15 and 45 years of age and in general educated to graduate level.

During the first 25 years radiOrakel existed it educated around 1500 people in the various disciplines within radio broadcasting, with many of these going on to become well known personalities within Norwegian broadcast media. The channel's overall goal is to conduct investigative, critical and experimental journalism. The purpose is to combat all forms of discrimination.

The station is constantly renewed by being passed on to younger feminists.

== Political platform ==
radiOrakel promotes an inclusive, intersectional feminism, and has said that "radiOrakel believes that feminism should be for everyone" and that "we believe that feminism must be inclusive in order to be progressive and continue to set the agenda for the societal development we want. Equality and inclusion must have room for everyone, regardless of gender, sexual orientation, work or beliefs." The radio station has also said that "we are feminists and it is equally important for us to promote transgender people, and other minority genders, their role and position in the media and music" and that the station opposes sexism, homophobia, transphobia and racism. radiOrakel maintains a close association with the Initiative for Inclusive Feminism and was among the signatories of a 2025 call for an inclusive feminism with around 30 other Norwegian organizations.
