= Free Jimmy =

- Film poster
- Directed by: Christopher Nielsen
- Written by: Christopher Nielsen
- Produced by: Håkon Gundersen; Lars Andreas Hellebust
- Starring: English Version; Woody Harrelson; Simon Pegg; Phil Daniels; Jay Simpson; Emilia Fox; Samantha Morton; James Cosmo; David Tennant; Jim Broadbent; Kyle MacLachlan
- Edited by: Alastair Reid
- Music by: Simon Boswell
- Production company: StormStudio
- Distributed by: Columbia TriStar Film Distributors International (Norway); Breakthru Films (United Kingdom)
- Release dates: 21 April 2006 (Norway); 17 October 2008 (United Kingdom)
- Running time: 86 minutes
- Countries: Norway; United Kingdom
- Languages: English; Norwegian

Free Jimmy (No: Slipp Jimmy fri) is a 2006 adult animated black comedy film. written and directed by comic book artist Christopher Nielsen and features a number of characters from Nielsen's comics. The plot centers around a group of individuals from different countries trying to find a wayward and drug-addicted elephant in the Norwegian wilderness before the others do.

The film is dedicated to Joachim Nielsen (1964–2000), the director's brother and a rock musician famous in his native Norway, who had died of a drug overdose after quitting them successfully for many years. Whilst well received in its native country, reception to Free Jimmy has been generally negative in the English-speaking world.

== Plot ==
The events of the original movie take place entirely in Norway; in the English-language version of the movie, the story begins in Britain and ends up in Norway with the travelling Russian circus.

At night, an animal testing laboratory in grimy central Oslo, Norway is broken into by a bumbling group of guerilla vegan animal rights activists called True Warriors Against Animal Torture and Subjugation (TWAATS). They first release some rabbits which refuse to leave. They then set the rats free, then the cats, which to the horror of the activists, eat the rats. Again to their horror, their dog Karma kills the cats. They bury the dead animals, vowing to at some point take revenge on "animal oppressing" society.

Meanwhile, three inept Cockney English stoner habitual criminals named Odd, Gaz and Flea (Odd, Geir and Kælle in the Norwegian version) watch a news story about the lab break-in at a decrepit apartment. Their shady Southern American friend Roy Arnie (a fellow Norwegian childhood friend in the original) arrives and offers them a job opportunity with Circus Stromowski, a travelling Russian circus led by Ringmaster Igor Stromowski. As they are in debt with Roy Arnie, trying to escape a local gangster named Ivan, and believe it is lucrative, they agree. However, upon arriving at the circus, they find Stromowski to be incompetent and deranged, and the entire circus is full of useless, miserable has-beens and tired animals that are forced to perform under the influence of narcotics. They are supposed to work as the animal handlers. The star attraction is "Jimmy", a captive large male elephant who is paranoid of police, missing half his tusk, and addicted to drugs. Roy Arnie gives Jimmy speed so he can perform spiritedly for spectators, and gives him heroin at night to sedate him.

Roy admits to the others that he has stolen seven kilograms of heroin worth over a million pounds from a tanker owned by the Russian Mafias, whom he joined the circus to escape from. The four plan to smuggle the heroin out of Norway by making an incision in Jimmy's buttocks, placing the bags of drugs inside and then sewing it back up. Roy Arnie plans to found his own circus using the money and believes Jimmy to be the key to his dream. However, on the night where they plan to steal the elephant, Jimmy escapes when he is accidentally given speed instead of heroin and bolts out of a door left open by TWAATS. Flea steals a van with no windshield in the ensuing chase of Jimmy which leads them up into the frozen moorland.

Three Lappish Mafia motorbikers dressed in traditional Sámi garb clothes part of the notorious "Laplander motorcycle gang" who have been hired by the Russian Mafias and are looking for the heroin and revenge on Roy Arnie tail the lads. The bikers overhear their conversation and learn the drugs are stored in Jimmy, and decide to pursue him first. Meanwhile, the TWAATS pursue him, intending to make him an animal rights symbol, but two abandon them, tired walking through the moorlands on foot. Jimmy is also hunted by a group of trigger-happy and redneck-type Scottish big game hunters (trøndere in the Norwegian version) who want to shoot a larger animal. The four stoners find a log cabin which is occupied by an elderly Asian-American couple but the three Lappish Mafia motorbikers find them there, kill the couple and torture the four stoners for the information on the whereabouts of Jimmy the elephant.

In the moors, Jimmy is close to death and suffering withdrawal when a benevolent moose befriends him and helps him by leading him to water, bringing him food, and providing shelter. The moose supports Jimmy to stand up on his own. Over the course of a few painful days with the moose's help, Jimmy recovers in nature away from exploiting humans.

When the groups find Jimmy, chaos ensues resulting in many of the people dying mostly violent, bloody deaths. The moose distracts the hunters who accidentally shoot a motorbiker - the other two and activist Marius die when he throws a grenade in the middle of a fall. Roy Arnie tries attract Jimmy with drugs, but he refuses and intimidates them. As Jimmy and the moose try to leave, Jimmy steps on Karma, splatting him. The naive, high-strung, grief-stricken activist Sonia loses her temper and shoots Jimmy in his incision using one of the hunters' rifles, unwittingly bursting the bags of heroin inside that quickly kills Jimmy from the massive drug overdose. Sonia recoils in horror and flees amidst her nervous breakdown with the other only surviving activist.

The stoners attempt to retrieve the heroin from Jimmy's corpse. The moose pushes some rocks which cause a landslide that buries Jimmy's body so his corpse can't be exploited. The stoners leave. At the mound entombing Jimmy, the moose poignantly mourns then gallops away into the sunset alone. Back at their apartment home, the three stoners assault Roy Arnie for leading them to the situation because of his circus dreams. Finally, Roy, full of remorse over his past actions, ventures to the moors alone to search for Jimmy. Roy disappears into a terrible blizzard calling out "Jimmy" in vain, unaware that Jimmy is dead.

== English-language version ==
The plot of the English-language version of the film remains virtually unchanged from the original in Norwegian. The audio track is dubbed over with English voices, with contemporary British dialogue written by Simon Pegg, and Pegg receives credit in the screenplay. It was released on DVD on 7 October 2008, by BreakThru Films, with Bill Godfrey as Executive Producer.

Unlike the original which was released in cinemas in Norway, Free Jimmy was a direct-to-video release in the English speaking world.

Although only the audio has been changed in the English-language version, the new dialogue makes for some changes to the original Norwegian film. For example, Roy, Odd, Flea and Baz are cockneys from London instead of east enders from Oslo in Norway (that has a similar working class type of sociolect as cockneys from east London). The rest of the film does however still take place in Norway, as the Londoners end up there anyway as they travel with the touring Russian circus. Other significant plot changes are obvious, such as other characters are made British instead of Norwegian, and the redneck-type hunting party are apparently Scottish in the English-language version.

=== Cast ===
The voice actors of the English-language version make up an international ensemble cast that include:

Actor	Role	Notes
Woody Harrelson	Roy Arnie	An American thief and ruthless wheeler dealer who has toured with the Russian circus and has dreams of starting his own circus. He is the catalyst for the events of the film which take place in Norway.
Simon Pegg	Odd	A cockney stoner and a down-and-out. Pegg also wrote the screenplay for the English-language version of the film.
Phil Daniels	Gaz	Odd's flatmate and also a habitual criminal.
Jay Simpson	Flea	The third of the stoner trio.
Jim Broadbent	Igor Stromowskij	Ringmaster of a deranged and even dangerous travelling Russian circus
James Cosmo	HudMaSpecs	Leader of the Scottish big game hunters. His nickname is due to his short temper, which when lost he says this and gives over his beloved specs to a subordinate to stop them being broken in a fight.
David Tennant	Hamish	One of the hunting party who is always trying to control HudMaSpec's temper
Kyle MacLachlan	Marius	Leader of the communist, vegan, animal right's activists
Emilia Fox	Bettina	Marius' partner
Samantha Morton	Sonia	A highly-strung and naïve animal rights activist suffering from extreme anxiety and who loves animals. Ironically, in a fit of rage after Jimmy the elephant trod on her dog Karma, Sonia shoots and kills Jimmy, the least likely character in the story to do so.
Douglas Henshall	Eddie	
Steve Pemberton	Mattis	
Reece Shearsmith	Ante	
Mark Gatiss	Jakki	
Megan Dodds	Claire	
Kris Marshall	Erik	
Lisa Maxwell	Lise	

== Themes ==
Free Jimmy explores a wide number of themes including addiction, drug abuse, freedom, nature, materialism, urban decay, animal cruelty and animal rights.

== Release ==
=== Film festival premieres ===
- The 2006 Cannes Film Festival in Cannes, France – May 25, 2006
- The Helsinki International Film Festival in Helsinki, Finland – September 15, 2006
- The Hong Kong International Film Festival in Hong Kong, China – March 20, 2007
- The Copenhagen Film Festival for Children and Youth in Copenhagen, Denmark – September 16, 2007
- The Waterloo Festival for Animated Cinema in Waterloo, Ontario, Canada – November 18, 2007
- The Busan International Film Festival in Busan, South Korea – October 20, 2006
- The Palm Springs International Film Festival in Palm Springs, California in the USA – January 15, 2007

== Production ==
It was Norway's first computer animated film. Costing in excess of 120 million Norwegian kroner it is the second most expensive Norwegian film to date, behind Max Manus. Montreal´s Medialink and the Danish studio A. Film A/S were involved in the production of the film with animation done in Maya, texturing at Photoshop and rendering at Pixar RenderMan alongside post-production done in the United Kingdom although the film was mostly a Norwegian production. The voice actors for the original Norwegian version included Kristopher Schau, Jan Sælid, Are&Odin, Egil Birkeland, Terje Ragner, Anders T. Andersen and Mikkel Gaup.

British comedy writer and actor Simon Pegg wrote a screenplay for the wider English-speaking world which was subsequently released straight to DVD on 7 October 2008 by BreakThru Films. The voice actors of the 2008 English-language version is made up of an international ensemble cast that includes Pegg himself, Woody Harrelson, Phil Daniels, Jay Simpson, Jim Broadbent, James Cosmo, David Tennant, Steve Pemberton, Reece Shearsmith, Mark Gatiss, Megan Dodds, Douglas Henshall, Kris Marshall, Emilia Fox, Samantha Morton, Kyle MacLachlan and Lisa Maxwell.

=== Theatrical releases ===
Free Jimmy was theatrically released in Norway on April 21, 2006, Finland on November 17, 2006, Sweden on April 27, 2007, Russia on November 22, 2007, the United Kingdom on October 17, 2008 and the Netherlands on January 28, 2010.

=== DVD release in the United Kingdom ===
Free Jimmy was released on DVD in the United Kingdom on January 22, 2010 by Granada Ventures.

== Reception ==
=== Box office ===
Free Jimmy grossed $2.3 million worldwide.

=== Critical response ===
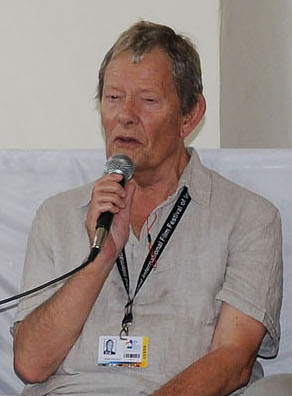
English film critic and historian Derek Malcolm of The London Evening Standard gave the film two out of five stars and wrote “But the characters don't add to the conception. Nor does the basic animation.”

Free Jimmy has an approval rating of 10% based on 10 reviews from aggregate ratings site Rotten Tomatoes. The website's critical consensus reads, "A weird, misfiring, Norwegian animated mess of a film. Unsure of who its target audience is, it misses every target." Xan Brooks of The Guardian described it as "joyless" and those who watch it to be "dumb animals themselves" and wrote "Free Jimmy is a sledgehammer Norwegian animation that metes out all manner of cruelty to dumb animals, not least the ones in the audience." Many Norwegian fans noted that depth of story was missing in the new version and that the overall message of the film and the original ironic humour had been lost in translation and the target audience had become unclear.

Richard Luck of Film4 wrote "Norway may be wonderful for many things but feature-length animation currently isn't one of them." James Christopher of Times (UK) called the film "deeply unhinged" and "deeply awful". Tim Evans of Sky Cinema gave the film one out of five stars and wrote "They say an elephant never forgets. But even the most anally-retentive pachyderm would be desperate to banish this misfiring mess to the darkest reaches of memory." Anthony Quinn of Independent (UK) also gave the film one out of five stars and wrote "The brief relationship that the escaped elephant forms with a resourceful moose is oddly touching, but the fatuities surrounding it ensure that any deeper involvement is unlikely." Derek Malcolm of The London Evening Standard gave the film two out of five stars and wrote "But the characters don't add to the conception. Nor does the basic animation." Leslie Felperin of Variety wrote "Pic could be too dark, dirty and insufficiently funny to achieve more than cult success." Derek Adams of Time Out London gave Free Jimmy three out of six stars, saying: "This adult-orientated, computer-generated animation isn't an especially successful outing but still serves as an impressive antidote to the Disney-Pixar norm."

=== Accolades ===
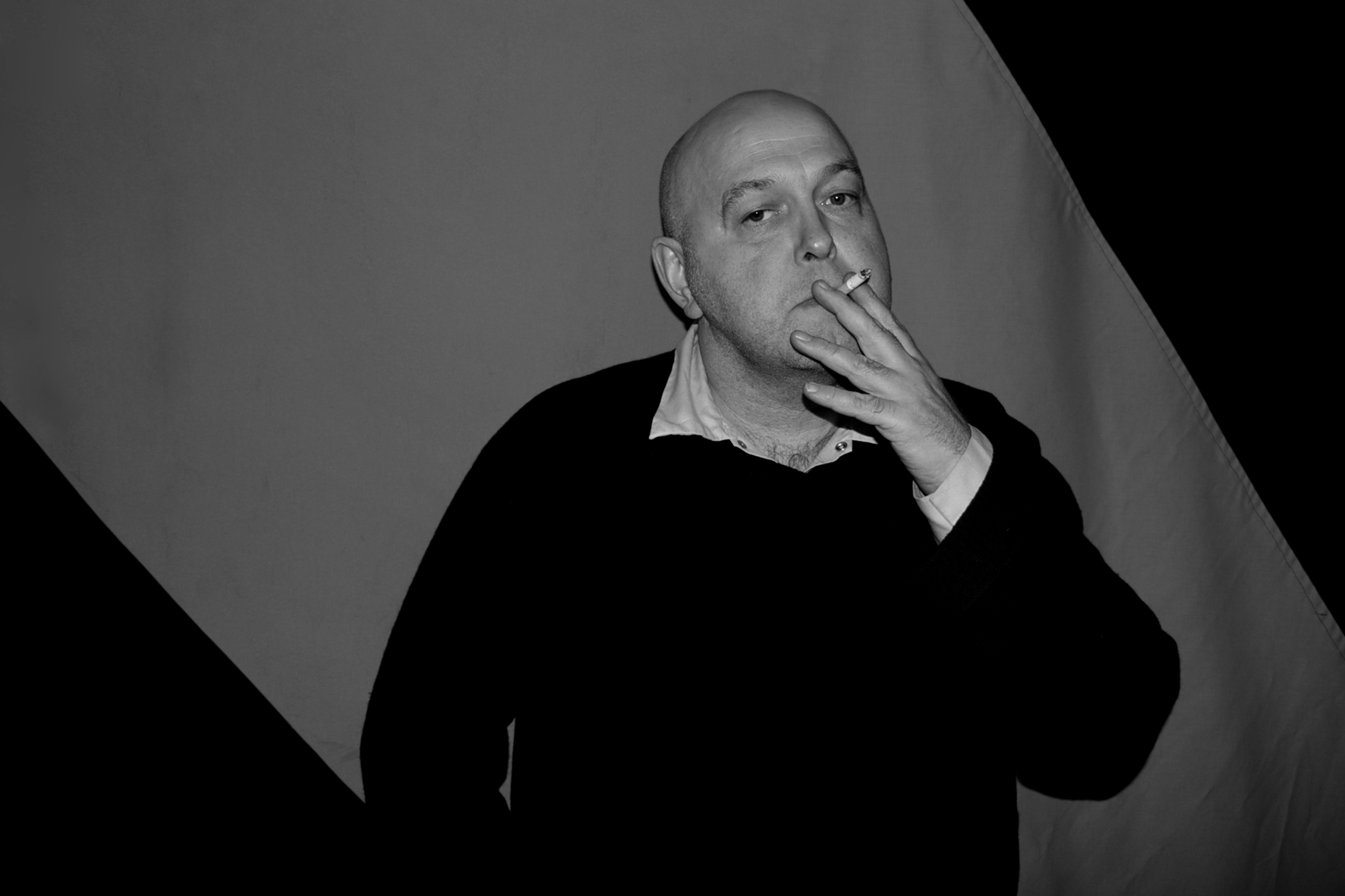
In 2007, the film’s director and writer Christopher Nielsen won a Cristal Award for Best Feature at the Annecy International Animation Film Festival.

Year	Award	Category	Nominee	Result
2006	Amanda Award	Best Film (Årets norske kinofilm)	Lars Andreas Hellebust	Won
2006	Nordic Council's Film Prize		Christopher Nielsen (director and writer); Simon Pegg (writer); Häkon Gundersen (producer); Lars Andreas Hellebust (producer)	Nominated
2007	Cristal Award	Best Feature	Christopher Nielsen	Won
2007	Kanonprisen	Best Music	Simon Boswell	Won
2007	Kanonprisen	People’s Choice Award	Free Jimmy	Won
