= Grusomhetens Teater =

Norwegian theatre company

Theatre of Cruelty (Norwegian: Grusomhetens Teater) is a Norwegian theater company based in Oslo's Hausmania cultural centre. The company produced its first performance in collaboration with Trøndelag Teater in 1989, and was established as an independent group in 1992. The theater has since its establishment been under the management and artistic direction of Lars Øyno. In 2002, the theater company received support from the Norwegian Arts Council to launch its own performing space in Hausmania.

The Theatre of Cruelty is inspired by Antonin Artaud's ideas of a double and physical theater, where the body's musical breathing and expressions are actions meant to generate deconstruction and retheatralisation.

== Performances ==
As of May 2022, the theater has produced 32 performances. Notably, the group produced the world premiere of Henrik Ibsen's incomplete prosaic comedy Svanhild (1860) on 14 March 2014. The group also produced the world premiere of Henrik Ibsen's unfinished opera libretto The Mountain Bird (1859) on 18 April 2009. This performance was threatened by the theater space flooding with water.

The company's productions are, as of May 2022:

- Red Emma (2021)
- The Raven (2020)
- A Streetcar Named Desire (2019)
- Who's Afraid of Virginia Woolf? (2018)
- LAMENT II (2018)
- VENUS & MARS (2017)
- “I IS ANOTHER”- Rimbaud in Africa (2017)
- PROUD CLOUD (2016)
- LAMENT (2015)
- Svanhild (2014)
- Revolutionary Messages (2013)
- Amazonas (2011)
- What a Glorious Day! (2011)
- Last Song (2009)
- The Mountain Bird (2009)
- Theatre and Science (2007)
- The Ugly Duckling (2006)
- The Spurt of Blood (2005)
- The Gospel according to Thomas (2004)
- The Dollhouse (2003)
- Peer Gynt (2002)
- Alaska (2001)
- Poetries (2000)
- Black Sun (1999)
- The Philosopher's Stone (1997)
- Woyzeck (1996)
- Storyteller (1995)
- The Road to Heaven (1995)
- The World of Jotner (1994)
- To Have Dealt With the Judgement of God (1993)
- Peace (1992)
- Elagabal (Trøndelag Teater, 1989)
