= The Mountain Bird =

Libretto written by Henrik Ibsen

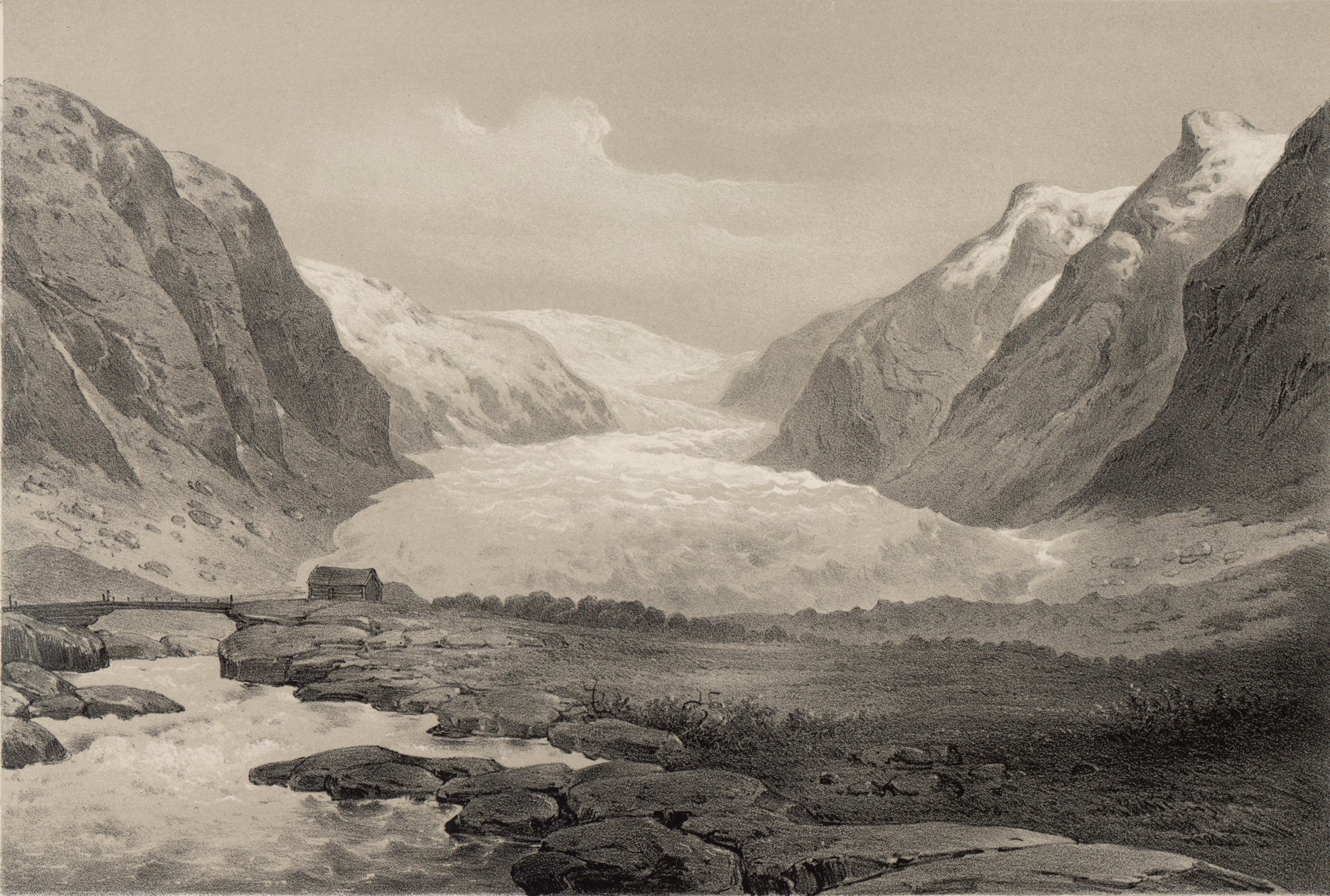
The illustration is included in the book "Norway represented in drawings" by Asbjørnsen, P.Chr. and published by Chr. Tønsberg (1848)

The Mountain Bird (Norwegian: Fjeldfuglen) is an unfinished opera libretto written by Henrik Ibsen in 1859. The opera was to have themes of Norwegian romantic nationalism, but Ibsen eventually lost interest in the associated themes and ceased development of the text. It was not published in his lifetime. The play was first produced and performed by Grusomhetens Teater in Oslo in 2009, 150 years after its inception.
