= Christopher Nielsen =

Norwegian comics artist

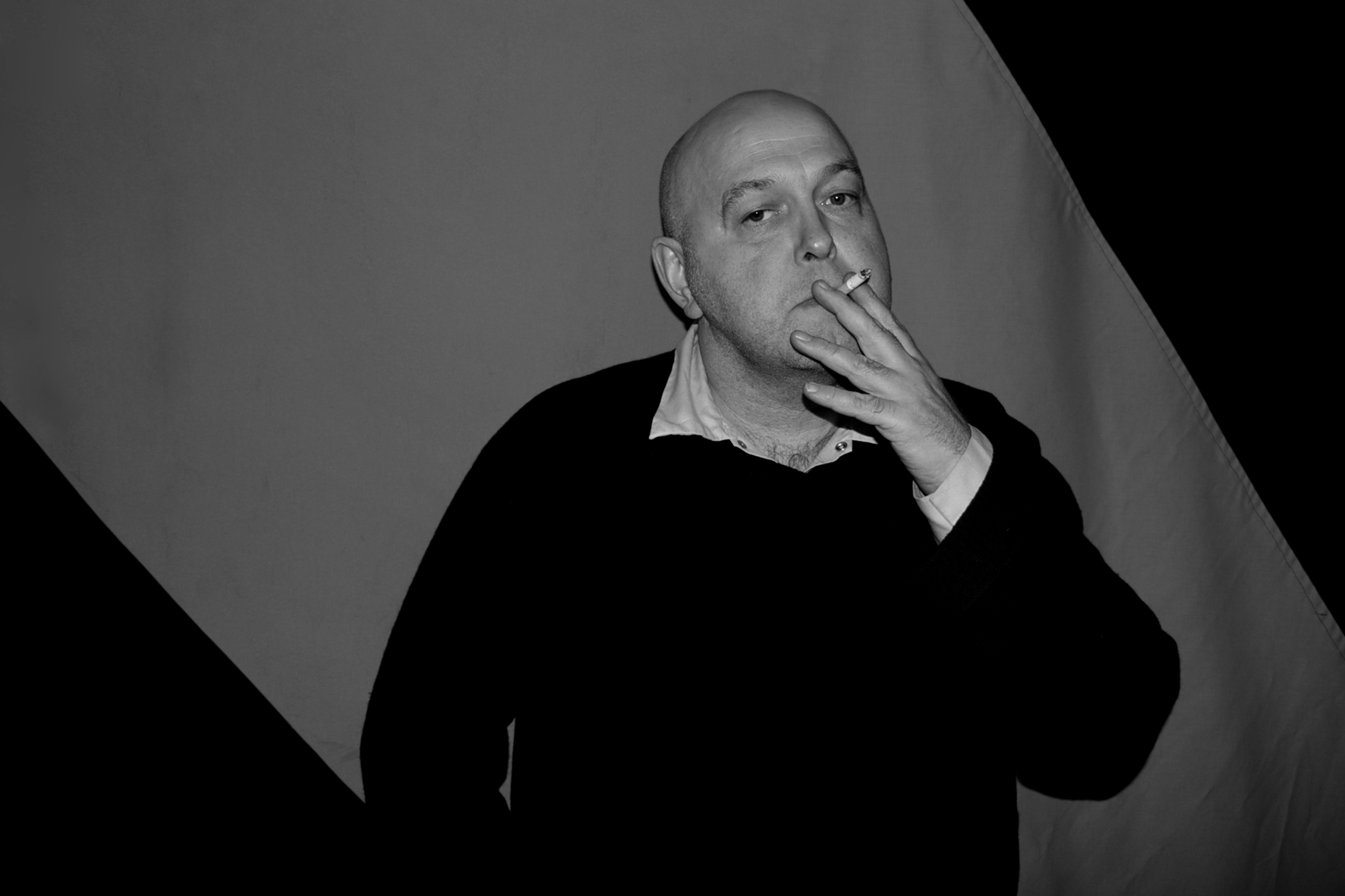
- Born: 20 April 1963 (age 62); Oslo, Norway
- Occupation: Comics artist

Christopher Nielsen (born 20 April 1963 in Oslo) is a Norwegian comics artist. He is especially known for his subcultural depictions. Nielsen got his first comics printed in 1980 after entering a competition in the Norwegian anarchist magazine, Gateavisa. Only three years later he got his first album published. Generally he works in a rough and direct style, inspired by the American underground comix tradition.

His most famous cartoon, To Trøtte Typer (Two Wasted Wankers), depicts the life of the two drug users and petty criminals Odd and Geir living their relatively boring lives in Oslo, Norway. This cartoon has been made into a feature for television, running for 13 episodes plus a Christmas special. They also star in the animated movie Free Jimmy (Slipp Jimmy Fri) along with several others of Nielsen's more famous characters. Another well-known character is the notorious Hold Brillan (Hold My Glasses), a huge "redneck"-like character who terrorizes his so-called mates and always gets into fights. Thus "Hold My Glasses" - he cannot fight with them for fear of breaking them.

Christopher Nielsen is the brother of late musician Joachim Nielsen. He drew all of the album covers for his brothers band, Jokke & Valentinerne, except one due to the artist being in India on holiday.
