= Norwegian Syndicalist Federation =

Norwegian anarcho-syndicalist group

- Norsk Syndikalistisk Forbund
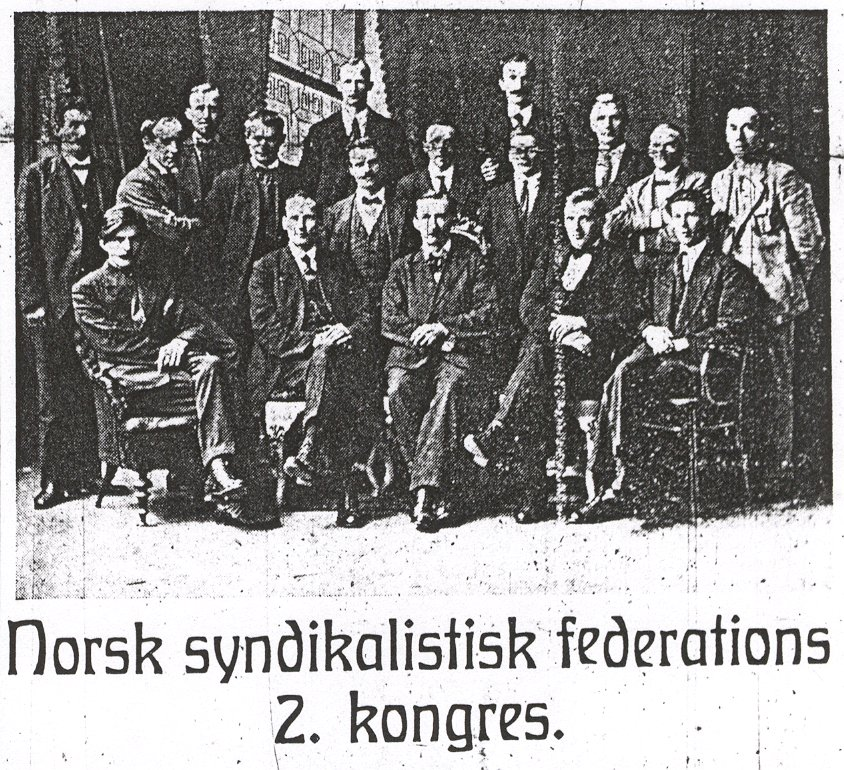
- NSF delegates at the organisation's 2nd Congress (1918)
- Abbreviation: NSF
- Established: 31 December 1916; 109 years ago
- Type: Propaganda group
- Registration no.: 913 702 352
- Purpose: Anarcho-syndicalist activism
- Headquarters: Oslo, Norway
- Members: 16 (2016)
- Publication: Alarm (1919–1940); Solidaritet (c. 1950–1960)
- Affiliations: International Workers' Association
- Website: nsf-iaa.org

The Norwegian Syndicalist Federation (Norwegian: Norsk Syndikalistisk Forbund; (Note: Bokmål: Norsk Syndikalistisk Føderasjon) (Note: Also translated as "Norwegian Syndicalist Union".) NSF) is an anarcho-syndicalist group in Norway. Established in the 1910s, the NSF worked within existing Norwegian trade unions in order to radicalise them towards revolutionary syndicalism. It was a founding member of the International Workers' Association (IWA) and historically maintained close connections with the Central Organisation of Swedish Workers (SAC). The NSF was politically repressed during the German occupation of Norway and, in the wake of World War II, experienced a dramatic decline. In the 1970s, the organisation was reconstituted as a propaganda group and continued its activities into the 21st century, with a much smaller membership.

== Background ==
From 1906, anarchism in Norway was closely linked with the Norwegian labour movement. The anarcho-syndicalist movement was constituted by opponents of the social-democratic leadership within Norway's trade unions. Although opposed to the reformist leadership, the Norwegian syndicalists pursued a strategy of dual unionism, working within existing trade unions with the intention of radicalising them. In the summer of 1911, a wave of lockouts resulted in trade union leaders agreeing to a compromise agreement with business leaders, which caused disillusioned workers to gravitate towards syndicalism. At a conference in Trondheim, syndicalists repudiated agreements with employers and instead endorsed methods of direct action to win workers' demands. In 1912, syndicalists began publishing the newspaper Direkte Aktion.

== Establishment ==
In 1913, syndicalists established the Norwegian Trade Union Opposition (Norwegian: Norske Fagopposition; NFO), which acted as an oppositional force within the Norwegian Confederation of Trade Unions (LO). The Norwegian syndicalists quickly developed close links with the Central Organisation of Swedish Workers (SAC), a relatively powerful anarcho-syndicalist union that counted 32,000 members by the end of the 1910s. Albert Jensen, a delegate for the SAC, represented the Norwegian syndicalists at the First International Syndicalist Congress, which took place in London in late 1913.

Although the NFO was supported by some within the Central Organisation of Swedish Workers (SAC), the SAC's decision to establish its own local organisations in Norway caused friction with the NFO. By 1916, the NFO counted 10,000 members, while the Norwegian branch of the SAC counted 700. In December 1916, the two parties attempted to reach an agreement, but talks broke down. The SAC members in Norway subsequently decided to establish their own independent organisation, the Norwegian Syndicalist Federation (NSF). Albert Jensen, a vocal supporter of the NFO, was fiercely critical of the formation of the NSF, which he considered to be a small sectarian group. By 1920, the NFO had succeeded in taking over the LO; its ideology subsequently shifted from syndicalism to communism. In 1919, the NSF began publishing its journal Alarm.

== International connections ==
After the conclusion of World War I, in February 1919, delegates from the NSF, SAC and the Danish Fagsoppositionens Sammenslutning (FS) met at a conference in Copenhagen to consolidate their international ties. In December 1920, the NSF declared its support for the revolutionary syndicalist conference being held in Berlin, where syndicalist delegates debated whether to join the Bolshevik-aligned Red International of Labour Unions (RILU) or to establish their own trade union international. The NSF ultimately signalled its support for the latter option. In June 1922, the NSF delegated Jensen to represent it at the international syndicalist conference in Berlin, which resolved to create a new trade union international. Finally, in December 1922, the NSF was represented by Gus Smith at the constitutional convention of the International Workers' Association (IWA), which brought together more than 2 million members of anarcho-syndicalist trade unions from throughout Europe and Latin America. An internal referendum by the NSF unanimously approved the creation of the IWA. At the time of the IWA's founding, the NSF counted 20,000 members.

== Repression and decline ==
During the German occupation of Norway, from 1940 to 1945, the NSF was outlawed by the Quisling regime. After World War II ended, although European anarcho-syndicalists had the possibility of returning to illegal activity, the movement entered a sustained decline. While the SAC managed to remain a major force in Swedish labour movement, the NSF effectively dissolved. During the 1950s, Alarm resumed publication under the name Solidaritet, which remained in print until 1960; some short-lived anarcho-syndicalist groups were also established, including the Syndicalist Youth Alliance (Norwegian: Syndikalistiske Ungdomsforbund).

Anarcho-syndicalism only began to experience a revival in Europe after the protests of 1968. Since 1976, the NSF has been reconstituted, continuing on as a relatively small propaganda group. In 1998, it counted roughly 40 members, who have continued to agitate for anarcho-syndicalism within Norway's larger trade unions. The NSF remained affiliated with the IWA into the 21st century.

== Bibliography ==
- Bayer-Arnesen, Harald (1998). "Anarcho-Syndicalism: A Historical Closed Door... or Not?". Libertarian Labor Review (22). ISSN 1069-1995.
- Damier, Vadim (2009) [2000]. Anarcho-syndicalism in the 20th Century. Translated by Archibald, Malcolm. Edmonton: Black Cat Press. ISBN 978-0-9737827-6-9.
- Kuhn, Gabriel (2009). "Anarchism, Norway". In Ness, Immanuel (ed.). International Encyclopedia of Revolution and Protest. pp. 1–2. doi:10.1002/9781405198073.wbierp0067. ISBN 9781405198073.
- Kuhn, Gabriel (2012). "The Nordic Countries: Denmark, Finland, Iceland, Norway, Sweden". In Kinna, Ruth (ed.). The Continuum Companion to Anarchism. Continuum International Publishing Group. pp. 420–428. ISBN 978-1-4411-4270-2.
- Marshall, Peter H. (2008) [1992]. "Northern Europe". Demanding the Impossible: A History of Anarchism. London: Harper Perennial. pp. 479–495. ISBN 978-0-00-686245-1. OCLC 218212571.
- Persson, Lennart K. (1990). "Revolutionary Syndicalism in Sweden before the Second World War". In van der Linden, Marcel; Thorpe, Wayne (eds.). Revolutionary Syndicalism: An International Perspective. Gower Publishing. pp. 81–99. ISBN 0-85967-815-6.
- Thorpe, Wayne (1989). The Workers Themselves. Kluwer Academic Publishers. ISBN 0-7923-0276-1. LCCN 89-8205.
