= Libertære Socialister =

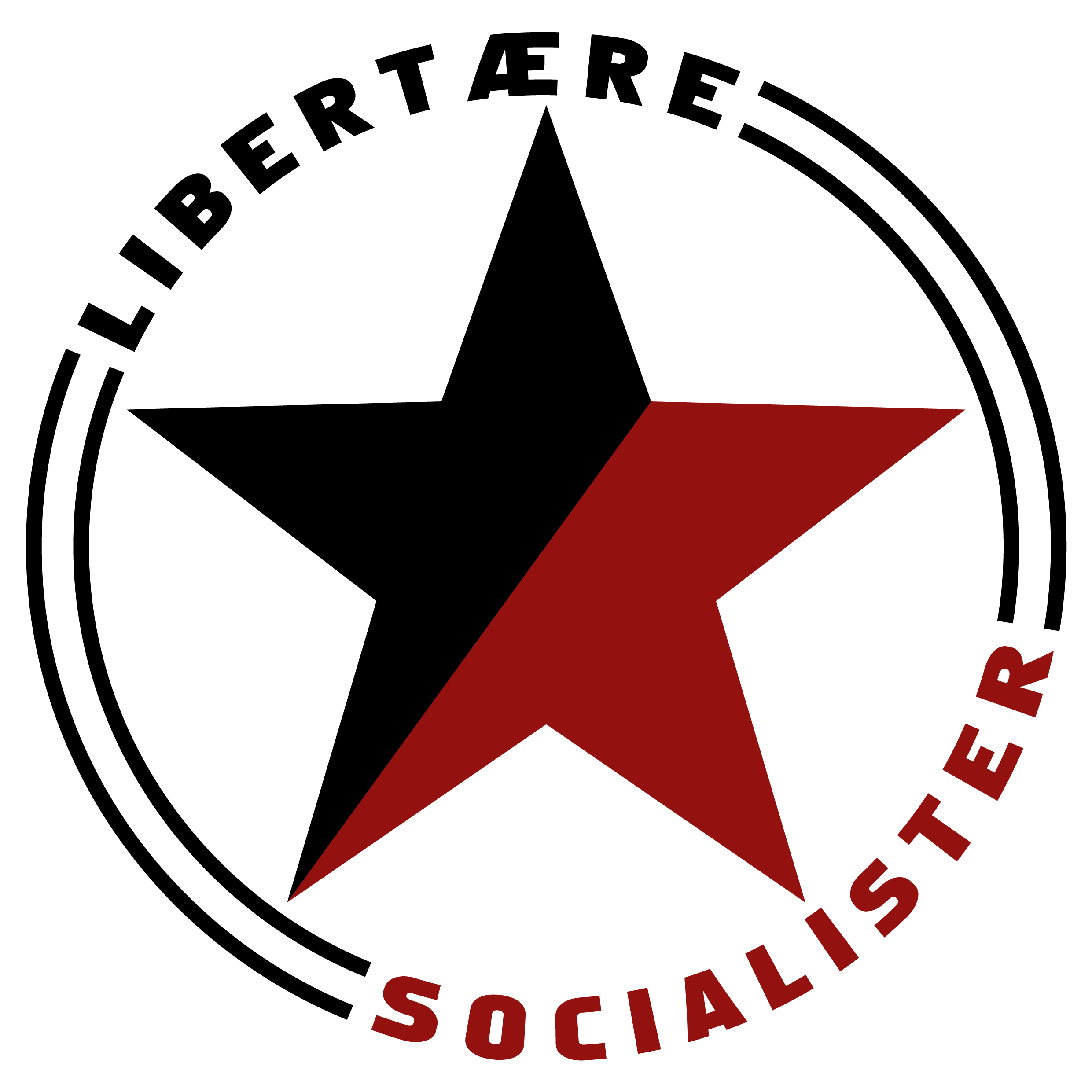
- The logo of Libertære Socialister (Denmark)
- Founded: 8 November 2009
- Dissolved: 2017
- Ideology: Libertarian socialism
- International affiliation: Anarkismo Network

Libertære Socialister (LS) was a Danish libertarian socialist political organization which was founded in Horsens on 8 November 2009. It was described by research Chris Holmsted Larsen as "the most important and most visible representative of the anarchist trend in Denmark".

== Activities ==
The local LS-groups arranged lectures and discussion meetings and get involved in political struggles and movements relating to environment and climate, industrial and social conflicts, anti-racism, anti-militarism, gender politics etc. The organisation had in several cases defended the use of political militancy under certain circumstances. During the protests at the UN Climate Change Conference (COP15) in 2009, 913 were arrested in a mass arrest and as part of this maneuver all involved in the LS block in the demonstration were arrested. Many of those arrested sued the police for wrongful arrest and at the end of the case the arrests were found to be illegal, and the police were ordered to pay damages. At the labor movements May Day meetings in 2013 LS participated in protests against the Social Democrats and the Socialist People's Party and the policy they have led after the change of government in 2011 (In Copenhagen LS played a leading role in these protests). During the protests there were claims by both sides of aggressive behaviour from the other side, some of which were later retracted. The protests had the effect that speakers from the Social Democrats and SF had to interrupt their speeches ahead of time at the meetings in Copenhagen, Aalborg, Aarhus and other cities.

== See also ==
- Anarchism in Denmark
- Platformism
- Libertarian socialism
- Social insertion
- Black Flame

== Bibliography ==
- Holmsted Larsen, Chris (2012). Political extremism in Denmark: a pre-investigation for mapping of right-wing and left-wing extremism (Report). Roskilde University. ISBN 978-87-995330-0-8.
- Jämte, Jan; Lundstedt, Måns; Wennerhag, Magnus (2023). "Radical Left Movements in Scandinavia, 1980–2020: Straddling Militant Counterculture and Popular Movements". In Zúquete, José Pedro (ed.). The Palgrave Handbook of Left-Wing Extremism. Vol. 1. Palgrave Macmillan. pp. 281–304. doi:10.1007/978-3-031-30897-0_16. ISBN 978-3-031-30897-0.
- Kuhn, Gabriel (2012). "The Nordic Countries: Denmark, Finland, Iceland, Norway, Sweden". In Kinna, Ruth (ed.). The Continuum Companion to Anarchism (2012). pp. 420–428. ISBN 978-1-4411-4270-2.
