= Liv Heløe =

Norwegian actress and writer

Liv Heløe (born 3 February 1963) is a Norwegian actress and writer. Working as a professional actor from the age of 11, playing several significant parts on film and in the theatre in both classical and contemporary drama, she made her debut as a writer in 1994 with Negressen, performed at Det Norske Teatret and on Norwegian national television. In 2006 she received the Ibsen Prize, a prize for Norwegian playwrights, for her plays Lise L and I dag og i morgen.

== Selected filmography ==
- Bat Wings (1992)
