= Storm on the Stock Exchange =

Civil conflict in Copenhagen, Denmark, on 11 February 1918

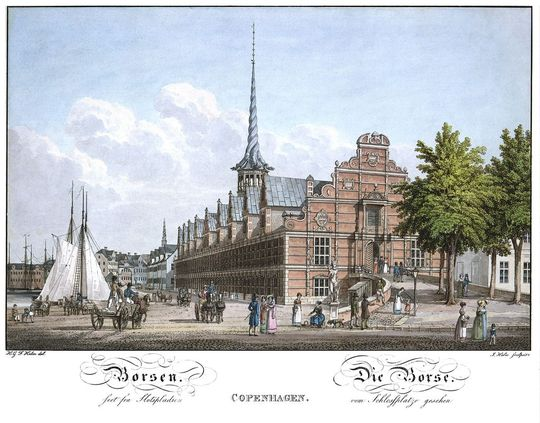
- Date: 11 February 1918
- Location: Børsen, Copenhagen, Denmark
- Caused by: Social inequality and high unemployment
- Methods: Direct action
- Result: Leaders fined, some prison sentences received

Parties
Syndicalists: Trade Union Opposition Association; Young Socialist Association	Government of Denmark: Police

Lead figures
Andreas Fritzner; Poul Gissemann; Jørgen Mortensen; Alfred Mogensen; Christian Christensen	Carl Theodor Zahle

Number
35,000-40,000	

The Storm on the Stock Exchange (Danish: Stormen på Børsen) was a violent attack on the Børsen (Denmark's stock exchange) in Copenhagen on 11 February 1918. The attack was organized by unemployed syndicalists.

== Background ==
Social inequality in Danish society intensified during World War I. There was high unemployment, rationing, housing shortages and lack of fuel, and the unemployed received little support. At the same time, speculators could make huge sums of money. Denmark was neutral and exported food to the German Empire at substantial profits. During 1918, Danish syndicalists were behind a series of unemployment demonstrations. The first unemployment demonstration led by the syndicalists took place on January 29, 1918, and went from Grønttorvet in Valby to the Riksdag in Fredericiagade. According to Solidaritet, 35,000-40,000 took part in this demonstration, while others believe this number to be exaggerated.

== Storming ==
The storming took place on Shrove Monday 1918 and started from two meetings, one in Folkets Hus (The People's House) at Jagtvej 69 and one in The Workers' Assembly Hall on Rømersgade. Only the leaders knew where the demonstration procession was going, and to fool the police they falsely leaked that the target was the Pork Hall, which was to be looted. The demonstration was led by the syndicalists Andreas Fritzner, Poul Gissemann and Alfred Mogensen, and it ended with a spontaneous attack on the Stock Exchange. The participants armed with clubs walked into the Stock Exchange and attacked the stockbrokers. Later, they attacked the police with rubble from the construction site of the third Christiansborg.

The attack was organized by, among others:

- Andreas Fritzner, from the Trade Union Opposition Association and Young Socialist Association (USF).
- Poul Gissemann from the Trade Union Opposition Association
- Jørgen Mortensen from the Young Socialist Association
- Christian Christensen from Trade Union Opposition Association

The leaders were punished with fines of 500 Danish kroner, which Andreas Fritzner called "a ridiculously small punishment". Five others received sentences ranging from 120 days to two years in prison.

== Reactions and aftermath ==
The storming of the stock exchange made a great impression on the contemporaries, especially politicians and media who distanced themselves from the syndicalists. Illustreret Tidende compared the storming with the ravages of the Red Army and looting in the Finnish Civil War, which was at its height, and added: "On the 259th anniversary of the assault on Copenhagen, we experienced the Danish storm on the stock exchange. It is truly time that the bourgeoisie again awakens."

After the storming, the syndicalists formed the Organization of the Unemployed (D.A.O.) which received great support. The syndicalists' struggle for the conditions and rights of the unemployed culminated in November 1918. The syndicalists convened a protest meeting on 10 November at Grønttorvet, which gathered 50,000 participants, and again on 13 November, where 30,000-40,000 participated.
