= Anarchism in Norway =

Anarchism in Norway first emerged in the 1870s. Some of the first to call themselves anarchists in Norway were Arne Garborg and Ivar Mortensson-Egnund. They ran the radical target magazine Fedraheimen which came out 1877–91. Gradually the magazine became more and more anarchist-oriented, and towards the end of its life it had the subtitle Anarchist-Communist Body. The anarchist author Hans Jæger published the book "The Bible of Anarchy" in 1906, and in recent times Jens Bjørneboe has been a spokesman for anarchism – among other things in the book "Police and anarchy".

== History ==
The history of anarchism in Norway can be traced back to the beginning of the labor movement in 1848, when Marcus Thrane started the country's first workers' union in Drammen. The following year he founded the "Arbeider-Foreningernes Blad". The magazine brought extensive excerpts from the writings of the French anarchist Pierre-Joseph Proudhon, the utopian socialism of the tailor Wilhelm Weitling, the communist creed of Etienne Cabet, references to Henri de Saint-Simon, Louis Blanc, and the works of other early socialists. Thrane was an admirer of Proudhon, whom he characterized as "arguably the greatest genius of our time", but he did not perceive himself as an anarchist. He is considered Norway's first socialist, and the father of the cooperative movement. At the end of June 1850, the workers' unions had 20,854 members in 273 unions. In 1851, Thrane was arrested and eventually imprisoned. The workers' unions were closed down or their grades changed. Thrane was released in 1859, and emigrated to the United States in 1863. He distanced himself from the assassinations of some anarchists after the Haymarket riots in Chicago in May 1884. Thrane personally knew one of those hanged.

Søren Jaabæk founded the first peasant friends' association in 1865, in Mandal. The peasant friends stood for a communist or localist tendency, with emphasis on decentralization and local self-government. The co-operative movement was an important element in the peasant-friend policy.

Arne Garborg, Ivar Mortensson-Egnund and Hans Jæger were some of the first to refer to themselves as anarchists. They ran the magazine Fedraheimen which was published in 1877–91. Garborg's interest in anarchism is based on Døleringen, which arose in the environment around Aasmund Olavsson Vinje and Ernst Sars and was a counterpart to the political and cultural nationalism that prevailed in Norway in the 1860s.

The student and newspaper man Rasmus Steinsvik was one of Garborg's apprentices, and in 1887 he established the radical target magazine Vestmannen in his hometown of Volda. Steinsvik tried to merge anarchism with unity and cooperation in the rural community. He advocated that smaller regional and local units should govern themselves through a fully developed local democracy. He called this freedom of government. In 1889, Steinsvik believed that Norway had to leave the union, the sooner the better. The anarchists in Norway were convinced that behind the shaky contemporaries there was a separate Norwegian form of society with an underlying message of equality, justice and the right to self-determination. At the same time, the anarchists were extremely international in their basic attitude, but they established themselves completely when their views were to be linked at the same time with national identity and self-assertion. The Norwegian anarchist movement "died out" after this, although there were traces of it in the Liberal Party's national democratic project.

The Federation of Anarchist Youth (FAU) started up in Kristiansund in 1966/67, but it was only after the student uprising in Paris in 1968 that interest in anarchism was really revived. Jens Bjørneboe wrote the essay "Anarchism as a future" in 1969. In 1971 he gave an introduction to the Student Society in Oslo on the topic "Anarchism… today?". Bjørneboe had a great influence on the new budding anarchist movement.

=== 21st century ===
The following projects are related to anarchism or anarchists:

- Hausmania – Many anarchists are involved in Kulturhuset Hausmania in Oslo. The book café Humla and the film collective Spis de Rike are located here, and Indymedia also used to have meetings there. In addition, the autonomous housing associations Vestbredden and H42 are located in the same quarter as Hausmania. These are inhabited by anarchists and governed by direct democracy. The punk scene Barrikaden is located in the basement on the West Bank.
- Blitz – Blitz is a self-managed youth center in Oslo. It is largely an anarchist project.
- Anti-fascist action (AFA) was the most active anarchist milieu in Norway in the 1990s.
- Gateavisa – Norway's oldest anarchist newspaper. Gateavisa has an office at Hjelmsgate 3. Here, the Liberty Forum also meets relatively regularly. Liberty Forum is a small group of anarchists and libertarian socialists who meet to discuss theory. There is also the anarchist book café in Hjelmsgate called Jaap Van Huysmanns Minde.
- Youth For Free Activity (UFFA) is a self-managed youth center in Trondheim that was started in 1981, six months before Blitz in Oslo. The activists in the house are mostly anarchists and the house is governed by anarchist principles. It contains, among other things, a vegetarian café, book café, a punk fanzine (Dønk Zine) and the film collective Spis De Rike.
- Svartlamon – Svartlamon is a small district in Trondheim with approximately 200 inhabitants. Demolition was threatened by the municipality in the 1990s, but it was finally protected after a long battle.
- Norwegian Syndicalist Federation (NSF-IAA) – The Norwegian Syndicalist Federation is an anarcho-syndicalist group in Norway. Established in the 1910s, the NSF worked within existing Norwegian trade unions in order to radicalise them towards revolutionary syndicalism.
- Motmakt – Motmakt is a Norwegian libertarian socialist organization that, through direct action, fights for a stateless, classless society. The organization is affiliated with the international Anarkismo.net project.

== See also ==
- Category:Norwegian anarchists
- List of anarchist movements by region
- Society Party (Norway)
- Anarchism in Denmark
- Anarchism in Finland
- Anarchism in Iceland
- Anarchism in Sweden
