= Fagoppositionens Sammenslutning =

Danish syndicalist organisation

Trade Union Opposition Federation
- Fagoppositionens Sammenslutning
- Abbreviation: FS
- Predecessor: Danish Syndicalist Federation
- Merged into: Communist Party of Denmark
- Formation: 1910; 116 years ago
- Dissolved: 1921; 105 years ago
- Type: Trade union federation
- Location: Copenhagen, Denmark
- Members: 3,000 (1918)
- Leader: Christian Christensen
- Publication: Solidaritet

The Trade Union Opposition Federation (Danish: Fagoppositionens Sammenslutning; (Note: Also translated as the Trade Union Opposition Coalition or the Trade Union Opposition Association.) FS) was a Danish trade union federation. Established in 1910 by syndicalist opponents of the social-democratic dominance over trade unions, the FS pursued a strategy of dual unionism and worked within existing trade unions with the intention of radicalising them. The membership of the FS consisted largely of industrial workers in Copenhagen, where they carried out a series of strike actions, including wildcat strikes, to improve working conditions.

The FS experienced a surge in growth during World War I as the social-democratic unions failed to keep up with the rising cost of living while the syndicalists secured reductions in working hours and wage increases. By the end of the war, the FS had reached its peak with 3,000 members; its members participated in the storming of the Stock Exchange, secured the eight-hour working day and the weekend, and contributed to a reduction in unemployment. Around the time of the Easter Crisis of 1920, the syndicalist movement experienced a series of defeats and splits that led to its decline. Divides between the anarcho-syndicalists and communists resulted in the FS splitting, with the former establishing their own small federation, while the latter merged into the Communist Party of Denmark (DKP).

== Establishment ==
The growth of syndicalism in Denmark was slower than in Norway and Sweden, as Danish trade union leaders had been able to establish collective bargaining rights much earlier than in the other Scandinavian countries. But following a wave of lockouts, when the social-democratic leadership of Danish trade unions agreed to a compromise deal with business owners, disillusionment among the rank-and-file began to increase. By the end of the 1900s, revolutionary syndicalist ideas had begun to gain traction within the Danish labour movement.

In December 1908, the country's first syndicalist organisation, the Danish Syndicalist Federation (Danish: Syndikalistisk Forbund; SF), was established. Christian Christensen, the editor of the SF's magazine, soon became the leader of the Danish syndicalist movement. In 1910, he established the Trade Union Opposition Federation (Danish: Fagoppositionens Sammenslutning; FS), which became the country's main syndicalist organisation during the 1910s. In December 1911, the FS began publishing its weekly journal Solidaritet (Solidarity), which was edited by Christensen. The ideological platform of the FS was closely influenced by the industrial unionism of the British syndicalist Tom Mann, who was invited to speak before the FS in Denmark.

== Early activities ==
Although they had relatively few active members, the syndicalists were effective at securing wage increases and cultivating social unrest within the labour movement. The Danish syndicalists pursued a strategy of dual unionism, organising within existing unions in order to influence their direction towards syndicalist practices. During its early years, the FS had only 30-40 members, largely drawn from Copenhagen's soil and concrete industries. When 1,200 soil and concrete workers went on strike in the winter of 1911, their social-democratic union leaders resigned, leaving the inexperienced syndicalists in charge of directing the strike. The social democrats attempted to delegitimise the strike by alleging that the workers had been manipulated by the syndicalists, a claim which Christensen rejected.

In the spring of 1911, in response to a series of lockouts in Copenhagen, members of the FS called sympathy strikes in support of the affected workers. Over the subsequent years, the FS increased its trade union presence, gaining the adhesion of blacksmiths, mechanics, dockworkers and construction workers in the Danish capital. But workers' support for collective bargaining procedures, which had benefited both skilled and unskilled workers, caused difficulties for the growth of the FS. Attempts were made to gain a foothold in provincial towns, but the FS mainly gained members in Copenhagen.

The social democrats came to see syndicalists as the main threat to their political party's leadership over the trade unions. Social democrats infiltrated syndicalist meetings to disrupt their proceedings and report on their activities to the party leadership, with one interrupting a speech by Christensen on syndicalism in France to defend the social-democratic unions in Denmark and Germany. In 1912, Carl Madsen, the general secretary of the Danish Confederation of Trade Unions, published a critique of the syndicalists' program of direct action, industrial unionism and decentralisation, claiming it would cause the "breaking up of the economic community".

The FS was closely connected to the Central Organisation of Swedish Workers (SAC), a relatively powerful syndicalist union with 32,000 members in several industries. At the First International Syndicalist Congress in 1913, the FS was represented by Albert Jensen, a delegate from the SAC. In 1915, Albert Jensen moved to Denmark, where he became a leading writer for Solidaritet, penning a number of articles that were critical of the Norwegian Syndicalist Federation (NSF).

== War and growth ==
By the outbreak of World War I, the FS had grown ten-fold, counting between 300 and 400 members. The material conditions brought on by the war caused a substantial growth in the syndicalist movement, as the Danish working classes were radicalised by the perceived failure of the social democrats. The Social Democrats party had aligned itself with the Danish government, which established state control over price and supply regulations. As the war continued, wages declined and prices rose dramatically. Social-democratic trade unions found it difficult to keep up with rising costs, as their negotiations for allowances were outpaced by the constantly increasing cost of living. During the course of the war, the FS grew ten times larger; by 1918, it counted 3,000 members, and its newspaper circulated 18,000 copies.

By 1918, the FS was actively campaigning against the war and the rising cost of living and was organising the growing ranks of unemployed workers. Throughout the last year of the war, mass public meetings and demonstrations were regularly held in Copenhagen, with one demonstration in February 1918 culminating with the storming of the Stock Exchange. Demonstrations often ended in clashes with the police; in the summer, four syndicalist leaders, including Christensen, were arrested following a protest. In November 1918, mounting protests against their imprisonment developed into a general strike. The general strike ultimately failed, but gave way to broader industrial unrest the following year, as workers began a campaign of wildcat strikes for the eight-hour working day and the weekend. In February 1919, lockouts shut down the capital's construction sites, while syndicalist-led strikes halted the functioning of the shipyards. Within a few years, strike actions and lockouts had increased by six times, unemployment had fallen from 18.1% to 6.1%, and the eight-hour working day had been achieved, causing a real wage increase of 28%.

== Decline and dissolution ==
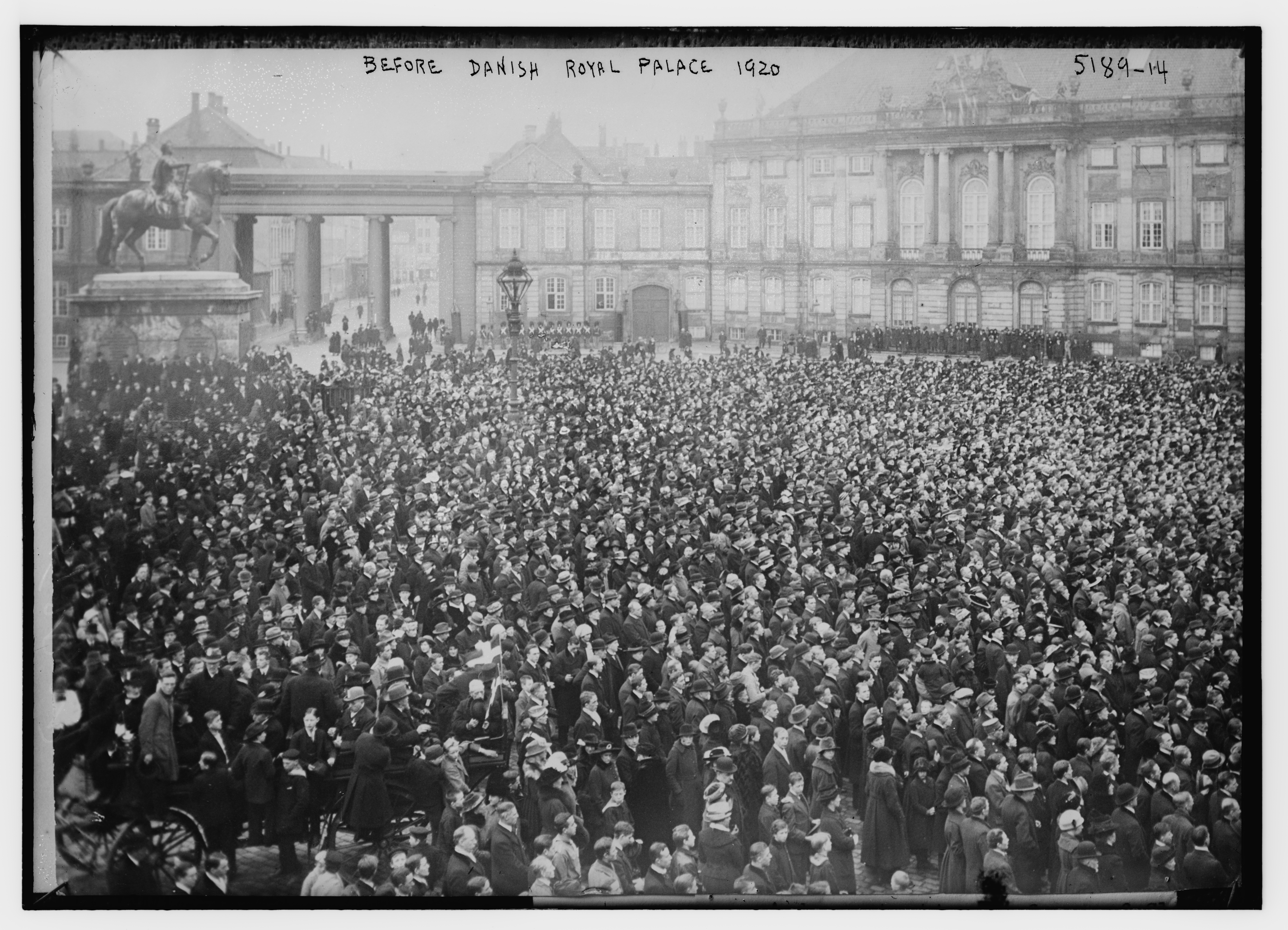
Political demonstration against the monarchy of Denmark, during the Easter Crisis

In March 1920, King Christian X dismissed the social liberal government of Carl Theodor Zahle, causing the Easter Crisis. The Social Democrats issued an ultimatum to the king: reinstate the government or they would call a general strike. The syndicalists initially rejected participation in the social-democratic strike, but eventually decided to participate on the condition that a new government release syndicalist political prisoners. However, the general strike was ultimately cancelled as negotiations for a compromise were carried out. Syndicalist dockworkers pressed ahead with their own strike actions but they were defeated after three months, contributing to the decline of the Danish syndicalist movement.

By this time, the FS had begun closely cooperating with the nascent Communist Party of Denmark (DKP). According to Christensen, while he had been imprisoned, anarchists had taken over the FS and had attempted to separate the syndicalist movement from existing trade unions. By working with the communists, he intended to "rescue" syndicalism from the anti-political influence of the anarchists. This move caused many syndicalists to break away from the FS. In September 1919, anarcho-syndicalists established a new trade union centre, the Danish Federalist Association (Danish: Dansk Féderalistisk Sammenslutning; (Note: Also translated as Danish Federalist Organisation.) DFS), although it was unable to gain much support. Meanwhile, the FS continued collaborating with the DKP, with the two organisations coming together to provide humanitarian aid to people affected by the Russian famine of 1921–1922.

Within a year, the Danish syndicalist movement had declined from a height of mass strike actions and trade union organising to effectively disappearing. In the spring of 1921, the FS merged into the DKP. The merger caused an internal fracture within the DKP, culminating in a split in January 1922. For the subsequent year and a half, there were two Danish Communist Parties, one which took a reformist line and the other a revolutionary syndicalist position. The parties re-merged in 1923, but internal conflicts persisted until the 1940s.

== Aftermath ==
In the wake of World War I, the Scandinavian syndicalist unions held a regional conference in Copenhagen, where they resolved to hold an international congress to establish a syndicalist international, but their plans were quickly halted, as the Dutch, Danish and Swedish governments all refused to allow such a congress to be held in their countries. After months of failed attempts, the international conference was finally scheduled to be held in Berlin in December 1920. At the time, the FS had expressed their support for the Berlin international syndicalist conference, which discussed whether syndicalist unions would affiliate to the Bolshevik-aligned Red International of Labour Unions (RILU).

After the founding congress of the RILU in July 1921, revolutionary syndicalist delegates, including those from Denmark, decided to instead establish their own trade union international. In December 1922, a delegate for the Union for Syndicalist Propaganda (Danish: Syndikalistik Propagandaforbund; SPF) participated in the founding congress of the International Workers' Association (IWA). The Danish organisation, which counted only 600 members, was the smallest section of the IWA. Danish syndicalists were affiliated with the IWA throughout the 1920s and 1930s.

Following the Nazi invasion and occupation of Denmark during World War II, Denmark's remaining syndicalist unions were banned by the Nazi authorities.

== Bibliography ==
- Damier, Vadim (2009) [2000]. Anarcho-syndicalism in the 20th Century. Translated by Archibald, Malcolm. Edmonton: Black Cat Press. ISBN 978-0-9737827-6-9.
- Frederichsen, Kim; Soimetsä, Ville (2022). "Danish friends of the Soviet Union: the history of interwar Danish–Soviet organizations". Scandinavian Journal of History. 48 (1): 48–70. doi:10.1080/03468755.2022.2043933.
- Greasley, David (2006). "A Tale of Two Peripheries: Real Wages in Denmark and New Zealand 1875–1939". Scandinavian Economic History Review. 54 (2): 116–136. doi:10.1080/03585520600759470.
- Knudsen, Knud (2023). "Syndicalism and Strikes in Denmark, 1917–1920: The Syndicalist Challenge to Social Democratic Trade Union Leadership". In Jørgensen, Jesper; Mikkelsen, Flemming (eds.). Trade Union Activism in the Nordic Countries since 1900. Palgrave Studies in the History of Social Movements. Palgrave Macmillan. pp. 69–91. doi:10.1007/978-3-031-08987-9_4. ISBN 978-3-031-08987-9.
- Persson, Lennart K. (1990). "Revolutionary Syndicalism in Sweden before the Second World War". In van der Linden, Marcel; Thorpe, Wayne (eds.). Revolutionary Syndicalism: An International Perspective. Gower Publishing. pp. 81–99. ISBN 0-85967-815-6.
- Thing, Morten (1998). "The Communist Party of Denmark and Comintern 1919-1943" (PDF). In Rojahn, Jürgen (ed.). The Communist International and its National Sections 1919-1943. Bern: Peter Lang. pp. 1–13. ISBN 9783906755861. OCLC 771022397.
- Thorpe, Wayne (1989). The Workers Themselves. Kluwer Academic Publishers. ISBN 0-7923-0276-1. LCCN 89-8205.
