= Hausmania =

Norwegian alternative culture project

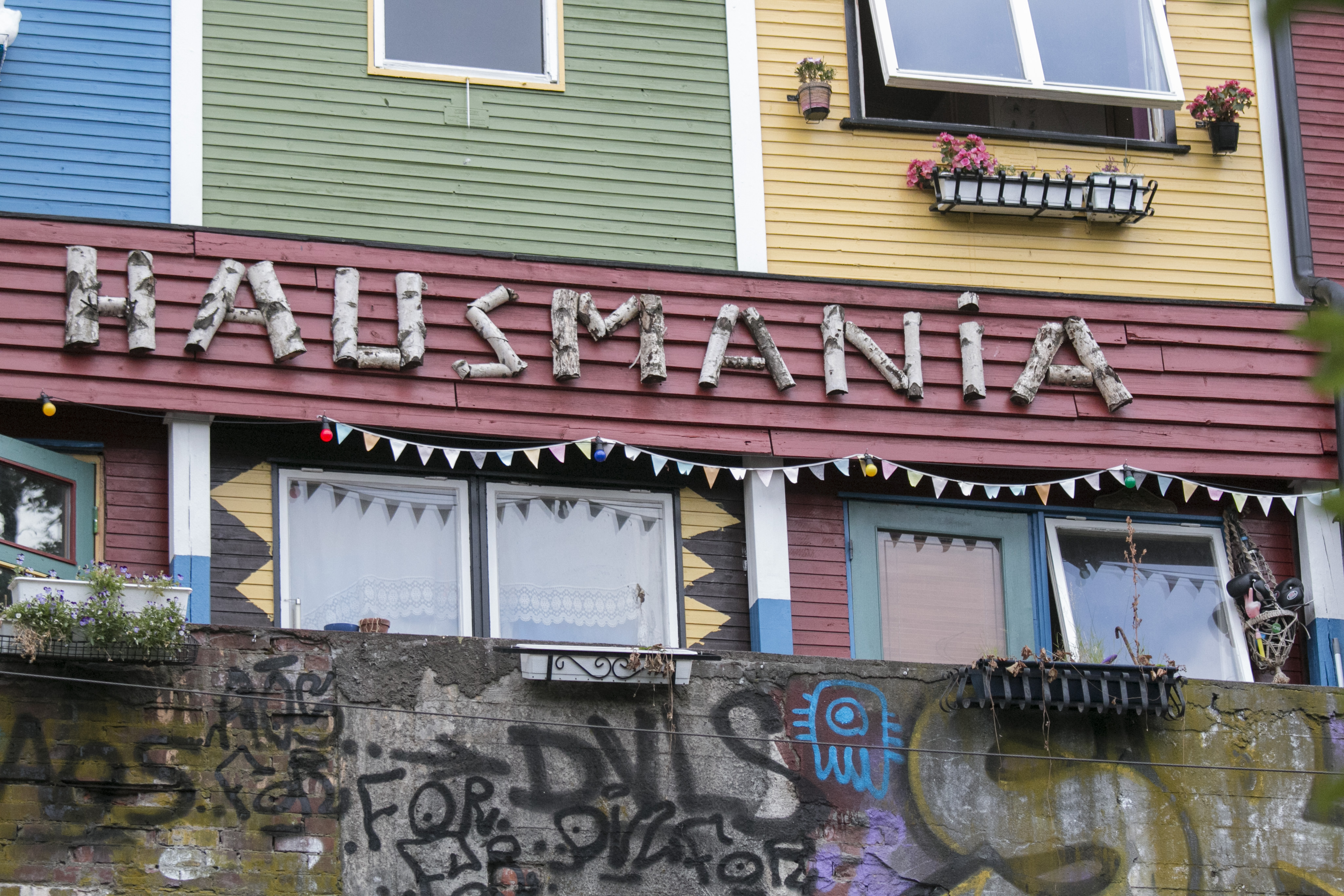
- Building in 2017
- Interactive map of Hausmania
- Address: Hausmannsgate 34; Oslo
- Coordinates: 59.9191°N 10.7521°E

Construction
- Years active: 1999–

Website
- www.hausmania.org

Hausmania is a self-managed social centre and cultural house (Norwegian: Kulturhus) in Oslo, Norway. It was squatted in 1999 by a group of artists and run based on collectivist ideology. It is located alongside other squats at Hausmannsgate 34, in a zone designated as a cultural quarter. Hausmannsgate 42 was evicted in 2016. The centre hosts artist ateliers, a theatre, galleries, an internet space, a vegan café and a legal graffiti wall. Nearby are Kafe Hærverk and Vega Scene.

== History ==
From 1999 onwards, several buildings in the area were squatted. A group of artists began to use the Hausmannsgate 34 in winter 2000, and it was later rented from the state property owner Statsbygg in 2003. After some problems with the municipality in 2004, the centre became established as a cultural centre and made plans alongside the Vestbredden squat (at Hausmannsgate 40) to be a "pilot project in inner city ecology, local governance, housing and culture". Around 30 people live at the project.

In 2010, Hausmannsgate 42 was ordered to be closed by fire regulations. It was evicted in 2016, along with Brenneriveien 1. The city council, which had bought the complex from Statsbygg in 2004, then decided to sell the buildings in the complex. The squatters presented a plan to develop Hausmannsgate 40 in line with the designation of the area as a cultural quarter, after working on a plan for two years with the property developers Anthon B. Nilsen Eiendom. In 2016, the development corporation Urbanium bought Hausmannsgate 40 as part of a package of plots costing NOK 30 million. At first, it demanded the eviction of the housing cooperative and then decided to offer to sell the nine apartments back to the people living there for NOK 10 million. Construction began in 2017 on Vega Scene, a new culture house for film and theatre at Hausmannsgate 28, next to Hausmania.

== Activities ==
The 5000 m^{2} centre provides space for artists' ateliers, practice rooms, exhibitions and other events. There are three galleries, a cinema, a skate hall and an internet café. There is a non-commercial vegan café called Blackeyedbean which serves mainly organic and fair trade products, and the Grusomhetens Teater (Theatre of Cruelty) is managed by Lars Øyno.

Outside, there is a legal graffiti wall. In 2017, Kafé Hærverk opened as a venue for experimental and independent music. It won the Oslo Prize that year. Alongside Blitz in Oslo and UFFA in Trondheim, Hausmania is a centre for anarchism in Norway.

== See also ==
- Squatting in Norway
- Anarchism in Norway
