= Blitz House =

Norwegian self-managed social centre

- Blitzhuset
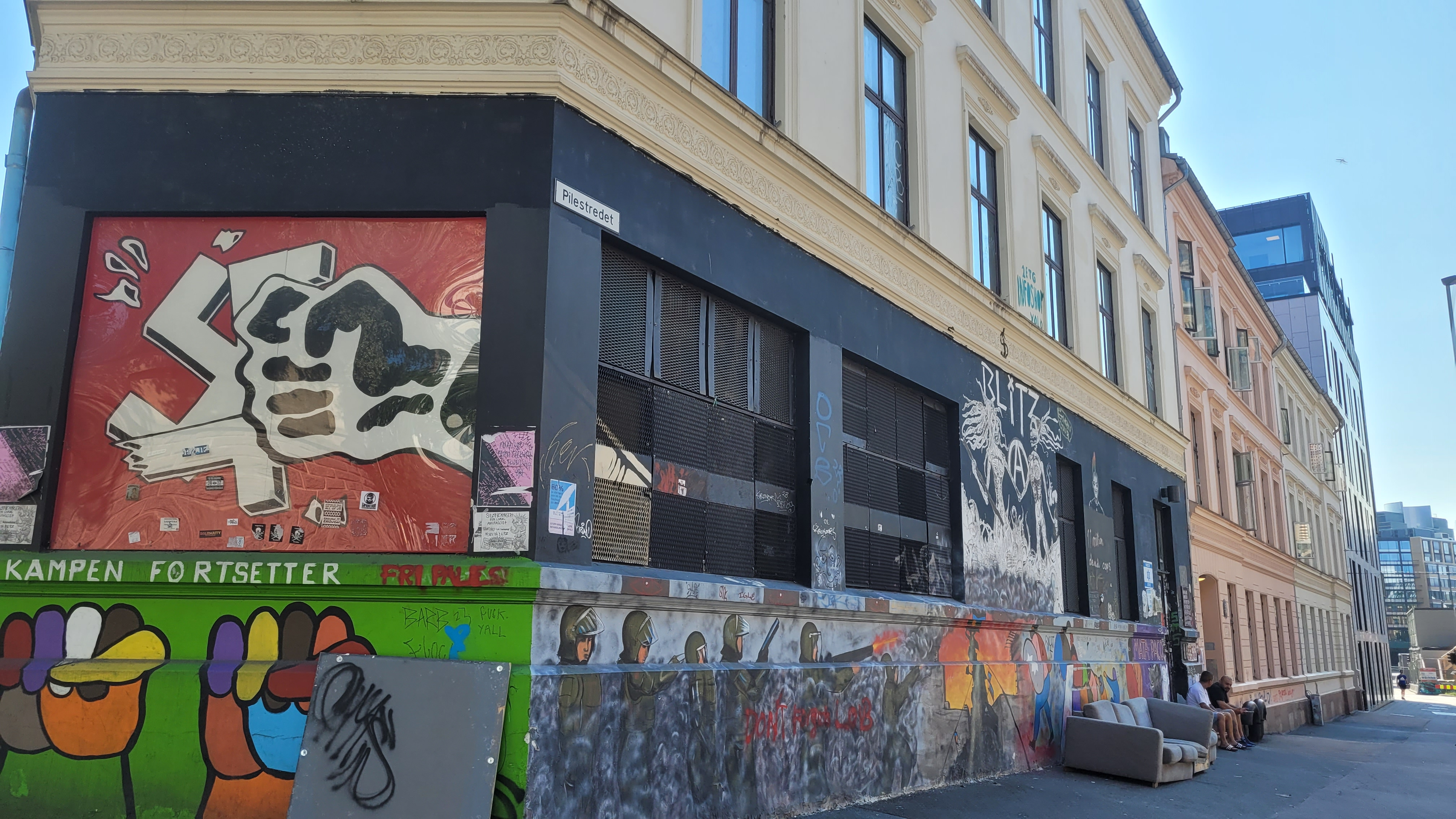
- Blitz House in Pilestredet Oslo
- Interactive map of the Blitz House area

General information
- Status: Legal
- Classification: Self-managed social centre
- Location: Oslo, Norway
- Coordinates: 59°55′06″N 10°44′16″E
- Opened: 1982
- Affiliation: Left-wing anarchism; feminism

Website
- www.blitz.no

The Blitz House (Norwegian: Blitzhuset) is a self-managed social centre hosting left-wing anarchists in Oslo, the capital city of Norway. Founded in 1982 as a squat, it is now legalized and based in Pilestredet. It hosts activities such as political meetings, the feminist radio station radiOrakel, a vegan café, and musician practice rooms. The Blitz movement has been involved in a number of protests and riots (such as the 2008–2009 Oslo riots), and has been attacked by right-wing extremists on numerous occasions.

== Facilities ==
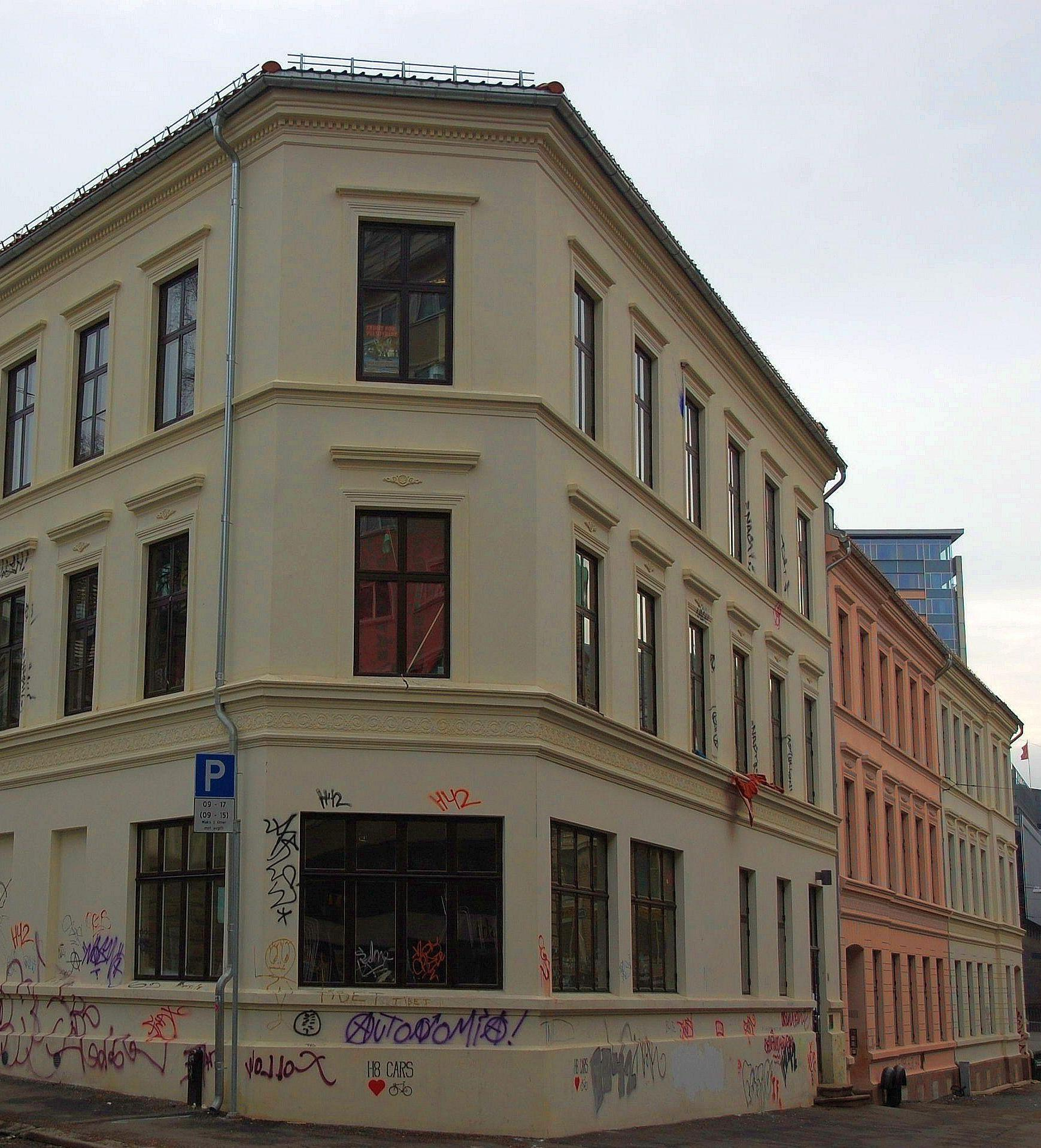
The Blitz House after renovation in 2010

The Blitz House is a self-managed social centre in Oslo, Norway. It started out as a squatted building in Skippergata 6 in downtown Oslo in 1982 and has since been a centre of anarchist activism.

In 1982, Skippergata was evicted and the squatters moved into Pilestredet 30c in central Oslo, where an agreement was made with the city. They were allowed to rent the house for a symbolic rent, and in return they would maintain the building. In 2002, the city council, led by the Conservative Party, put the Blitz house on sale. The activists responded with protests and battered the entrance of the Oslo City Hall, and the sale was stopped. The Christian Democratic Party (KrF) criticized the group and attempted to stop the lease.

Among the activities of the house are a feminist radio station (radiOrakel), a vegan café, a concert hall, practice rooms for musicians and bookshop and infoshop. Alongside Hausmania in Oslo and UFFA in Trondheim, Blitz is a centre for anarchism in Norway.

== Incidents ==
During the 1980s, the people around Blitz were involved in many protests for example during the visits of the British prime minister Margaret Thatcher in 1986 and US Secretary of Defense Caspar Weinberger in 1987. The demonstrations turned into street battles between Blitz sympathisers and the police. From the 1990s onwards, Blitz has often obstructed legal meetings of right-wing political parties such as the Progress Party, the minor Fatherland Party and the Democrats.

The house was bombed by neo-Nazis in 1990 and 1994. Mayhem bassist Varg Vikernes allegedly planned to blow up the Blitz House and had stockpiled 150 kg of explosives and 3,000 rounds of ammunition at the time of his arrest for the murder of bandmate Euronymous in 1993. Blitz openly supported and took part in the 2008–09 Oslo riots.

== See also ==
- Anarchism in Norway
- Squatting in Norway
- Ungdomshuset, a similar project in Denmark
