= Hjelmsgate 3 =

Self-managed social centre in Oslo, Norway

- Norwegian Cultural Heritage Site
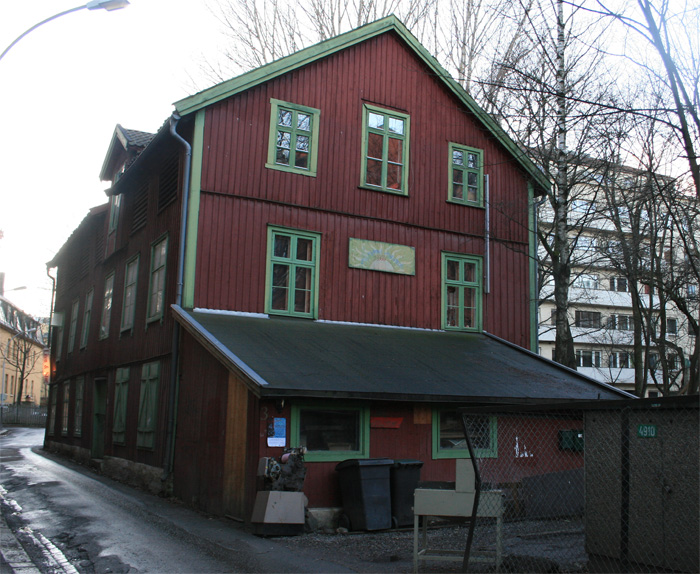
- Hjelmsgate 3 in 2008
- Type: Self-managed social centre
- Status: Protected
- County: Oslo
- Municipality: Oslo
- Coordinates: 59°55′30″N 10°43′20″E
- Year built: 1858
- ID: 167687

Hjelmsgate 3 is a self-managed social centre in Oslo, Norway. The wooden house was constructed in 1858 and from the late 1960s onwards it has been a central node in the Norwegian counterculture.

== History ==
Hjelmsgate 3 was built in 1858 to be used as a tannery and alternative businesses have used Hjelmsgate 3 since the late 1960s. In 1969 it became derelict and was squatted, before being legalized by the city council. The council gave it heritage status in 1979 and handed over the ownership in 1981 to an umbrella group (Stiftelsen Arbeidskollektivet) which represents the organizations using the building. It became an important node in the Norwegian counterculture and a meeting place for anarchists, squatters, gays and lesbians.

The anarchist magazine Gateavisa has been published out of Hjelmsgate 3 from 1970 onwards. Jens Bjørneboe gave a contribution of NOK 2000 to the editorial collective to help with repairs to the building. Spisestedet, the vegetarian café, first opened in 1972 and there are also a bicycle workshop and a radical bookshop and infoshop.

== Fire ==
On 26 June 2014, Hjelmsgate was severely damaged by a fire after being struck by lightning. The offices of Gateavisa were destroyed but the bicycle workshop on the ground floor survived and could carry on its operations. Spisestedet was forced to close.

== See also ==
- Squatting in Norway
- Anarchism in Norway
