= Gateavisa =

Norwegian magazine

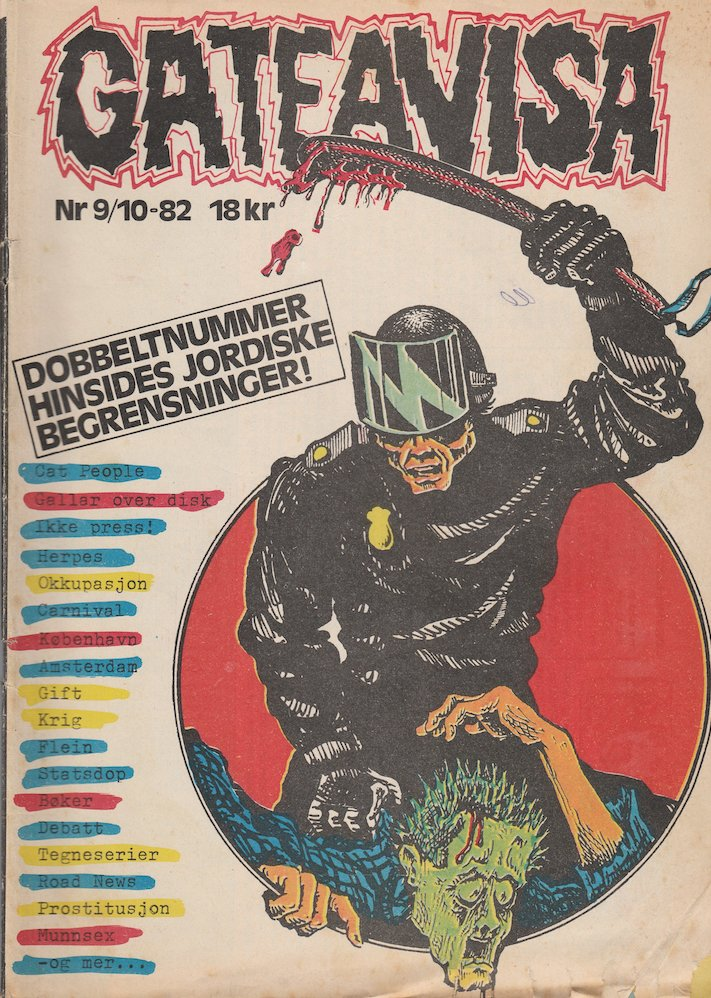
- A cover from 1982
- First issue: 1970
- Language: Norwegian
- Website: www.gateavisa.no

Gateavisa (Norwegian: Street Newspaper) is a countercultural magazine. It was first produced by an anarchist collective in 1970 at Hjelmsgate 3 in Oslo and focuses on anti-authoritarian topics. In it heyday in the early 1980s, an issue examining the stolen rubbish of two prime ministerial candidates sold over 20,000 copies. In 2020, a book celebrated 50 years of the magazine.

== History ==
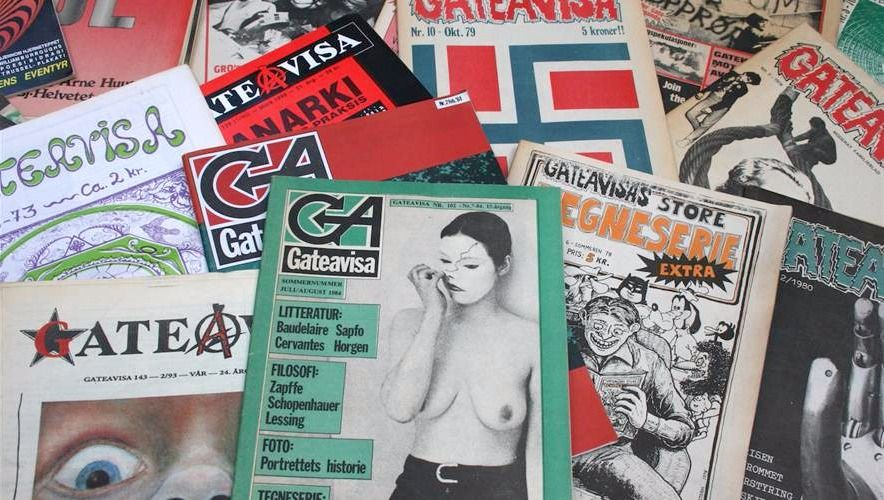
Assorted Gateavisa covers

Gateavisa was first produced at Hjelmsgate 3 in 1970, as an anarchist magazine, released monthly. The editorial collective included anthropologist Thomas Hylland Eriksen. The anti-authoritarian magazine at first covered occultism and mysticism then changed its focus.

Inspired by Kristiania Bohemians, surrealism, Dadaism and existentialism, at its peak in the late 1970s and early 1980s, the magazine had a greater circulation than Klassekampen and Ny Tid. It had between 4,000 and 5,000 subscribers and sent copies to prisoners for free. There were 50 street vendors across the country. All editors worked as volunteers and the magazine was early in its support of issues such as gay rights and the legalization of cannabis.

Gateavisa published work from Christopher Nielsen, Stig Sæterbakken and Merethe Lindstrøm. The magazine achieved notoriety in 1981, when it published an article about the stolen rubbish of the two prime ministerial candidates Gro Harlem Brundtland and Kåre Willoch. The issue sold over 20,000 copies.

Between 1987 and 1988, the magazine was known as Glasnost. The book Alt mulig fra Gateavisa, 1970–1986 (Everything possible from Gateavisa, 1970–1986) was published in 2020 to mark 50 years of the magazine.
