= Gerson Trier =

Danish socialist (1851–1918)

Gerson Georg Trier
- Born: 23 April 1851; Copenhagen, Denmark
- Died: 22 December 1918 (aged 67); Copenhagen, Denmark
- Political party: Social Democrats
- Spouse: Christiane Hansine Theodora Hansen
- Parents: Ludvig Meyer Trier (father); Celilie Trier née Melchior (mother)

Gerson Georg Trier (23 April 1851 - 22 December 1918) was a Danish social democrat, journalist, language teacher and translator.

== Biography ==
Gerson Trier was the son of the manufactured goods wholesaler Ludvig Meyer Trier (1815–1884) and of Celilie Trier née Melchior (1819–1890). In 1869 he graduated from the "Det von Westenske Institute" and then studied Romance languages at the University of Copenhagen. In 1876, he went to France, where he continued his studies and graduated. For the next three years he taught languages in Denmark, trained in a wallpaper factory and began studying chemistry. In 1879, he moved to Paris and continued his chemical studies, finding a job in a sugar factory. Later he became an authorized notary in Paris and in 1883 he headed a department of the Paris trading house in London. He lived in London until 1888, where he made contact with Friedrich Engels, with whom he entered into correspondence.

At the end of January 1885, Gerson Trier asked Engels for permission to translate The Origin of the Family, Private Property and the State. Engels also wrote a foreword for the Danish translation: “Note til danske læser.” In 1888 the translation was published as Volume 7 of the “Socialistisk Bibliotek”, which was edited by Emil Wiinblad.

In 1888 he returned to Copenhagen and joined a Marxist discussion club, which consisted of members of the Social Democratic Party, together with the Danish wood turner Nikolaj Lorents Petersen, whom Trier had already met in Paris and London. In 1889, the pair tried to send revolutionary representatives of the Danish labor movement to the founding congress of the Second International (14-20 July 1889 in Paris). For this they wrote various articles in their newspaper Arbejderen, Socialistisk Ugeblad. On 7 November 1890 Trier and Petersen were expelled from the Social Democratic Party because of their non-reformist positions at the request of party chairman Peter Christian Knudsen. The weekly Arbejderen, Socialistisk Ugeblad, founded in April 1889, then became the organ of the Revolutionary Socialist Workers' Party, which also published several works by Friedrich Engels for the first time in Danish.

On 20 November 1891 Trier married Christiane Hansine Theodora Hansen, who was born on 23 March 1870 in Tårnby on the island of Amager.

In 1901 Gerson Trier and Nikolaj Lorents Petersen were re-accepted into the Social Democratic Party and Trier worked there as a "member of the main board and the program commission". During World War I, the Danish Social Democrats entered the bourgeois government under Thorvald Stauning. Gerson Trier took a position against this in 1916, by declaring that he no longer wanted to be a member of a "bourgeois party". He died on 22 December 1918 as a result of a serious illness.
