= Christian Christensen (author) =

Danish writer (1882–1960)

Christian Eli Christensen
- Born: 12 January 1882; Bandholm, Denmark
- Died: 1 June 1960 (aged 78); Blovstrød
- Resting place: Blovstrød Cemetery
- Occupations: Author, editor, trade unionist
- Political party: Social Democrats (1900–1906); Communist Party (1921–1936)

Christian Eli Christensen (12 January 1882 – 10 June 1960) was a Danish author and revolutionary syndicalist.

== Biography ==
He was born on Lolland, but at 5-years old he moved with his parents to Copenhagen, where he grew up. Christensen joined the Social Democratic Youth League at the age of 18, but resigned in 1906. Two years later he joined the newly formed Syndicalist League, and in 1910 he became a member of the revolutionary trade union movement, the Trade Union Opposition Association. He became editor of the movement's member magazine Solidaritet (1911–1921), however, his tenure was interrupted by a prison stay after World War I (1918–1920). The reason for his imprisonment was that he had called for the overthrow of the state, in connection with the fact that he was one of the main men behind Stormen på Børsen. In 1921 Christensen joined the Communist Party of Denmark and was editor of the party organ Arbejderbladet (1921–1922). However, he did not like the leadership of the party. He moved to Silkeborg in 1923, where he met the young Asger Jorn, on whom he made a lifelong impression. His break with the Communist Party came in 1936, when he left in protest against the first of the Moscow Trials. Later he tried to revive the syndicalist movement, but he never succeeded.

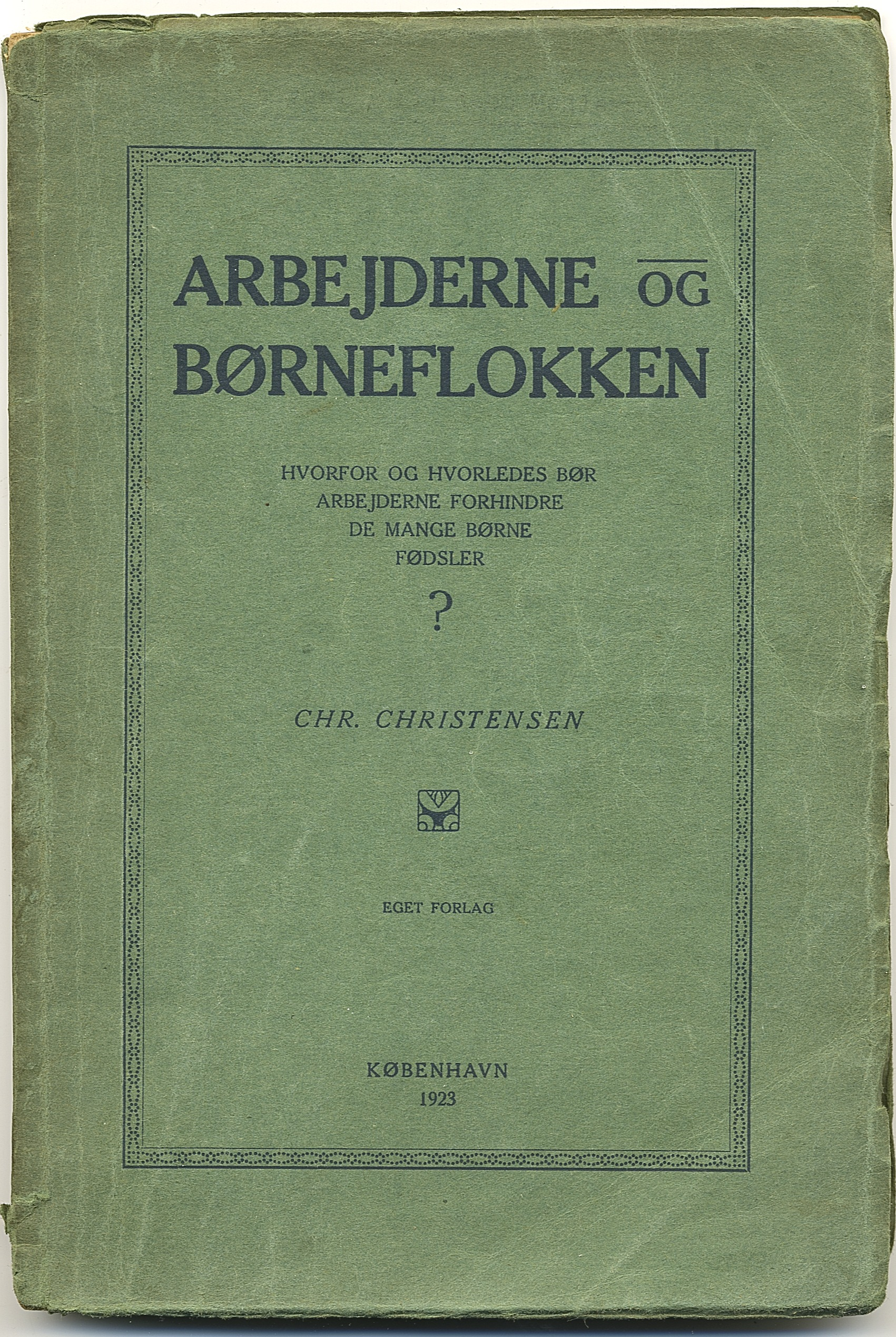
Christian Christensen's book Arbejderne og Børneflokken (1910).

His authorship began in 1910 with the book Arbejderne og børneflokken, which was a battle script for sexual liberation and pregnancy prevention, which was one of the first publications about the subject in Denmark. Christian Christensen's memoirs were written shortly before his death, they were published and edited by his colleague from the syndicalist movement Halfdan Rasmussen. The books describe growing up in the Rhubarb Quarter near the current Rantzausgade in Nørrebro.

In 1960, Asger Jorn dedicated "Critique de la politique économique" from the series of "Reports presented to the Situationist International" to Christian Christensen.

A memorial stone for Christian Christensen, erected by Asger Jorn at "De små fisk" at Sejs, was laid in 1963. He is buried in Blovstrød Cemetery.
