= Trade unions in Norway =

- National organization(s): LO-Norway, Unio, YS, Akademikerne
- Total union membership: 1.9 million (2019)
- Density: 49.2% (2018)
- CBA coverage: 72.5% (2014)

Global Rights Index
- 1 Sporadic violations of rights

International Labour Organization
- Norway is a member of the ILO

Convention ratification
- Freedom of Association: 4 July 1949
- Right to Organise: 17 February 1955

Trade unions in Norway first emerged with the efforts of Marcus Thrane and the formation of the Drammen Labour Union in 1848 which organised agricultural workers and crofters. However, with Thrane's imprisonment and the suppression of the union in 1855, it was not until 1872 before a union was founded again, by print workers. In 1899 the first national federation, the LO, was founded. During this period interactions with trade unions in Denmark and Sweden played a great influence over the development of trade unions in Norway.

In Norway today around half of all workers are trade union members and almost three-quarters of all workers are covered by collective agreements. There are four confederations with affiliated members: Confederation of Unions for Professionals, Confederation of Vocational Unions, Federation of Norwegian Professional Associations, Norwegian Confederation of Trade Unions.

Trade union membership in Norway, 2019
	Number of unions	Share of union membership	Total membership	Change 2018-19
Confederation of Unions for Professionals (Unio)	8	19.7%	375,181	▲2.0%
Confederation of Vocational Unions (YS)	13	11.8%	225,794	▲1.5%
Federation of Norwegian Professional Associations (Akademikerne)	11	11.6%	220,005	▲5.2%
Norwegian Confederation of Trade Unions (LO)	20	50.0%	952,394	▲1.7%
Unaffiliated	15	6.9%	130,991	▲7.3%
Totals	67	100%	1,904,365	▲2.5%
Source: Statistics Norway

== See also ==
- Economy of Norway
- Norsk Syndikalistisk Forbund – Norwegian anarcho-syndicalist group
