= Helmut Kirschey =

German anarchist (1913–2003)

- Born: 22 January 1913; Elberfeld, Wuppertal, Rhine, German Empire
- Died: 23 August 2003 (aged 90); Gothenburg, Sweden
- Citizenship: German (1913–1933); Swedish (1955–2003)
- Movement: Anarcho-syndicalism, Communism

Helmut Kirschey (22 January 1913 – 23 August 2003) was a German anarchist and resistance fighter.

== Biography ==
When Helmut Kirschey was four years old, his father, who was a member of the SPD, died as a soldier in World War I. His mother was left with six children, four boys and two girls. She became a member of the USPD and, at the end of 1920, joined the KPD. She also acted as an advisor to the International Federation of Victims of War and Labor, which looked after the pension and pension claims of war victims and widows. In May 1924 she was elected as a city councilor of the KPD in Elberfeld. On 23 August 1924, she died of an appendix operation at the age of 40.

All sons followed their mother's political commitment and joined communist organizations. Helmut Kirschey, however, left the Young Communist League of Germany (KJVD) in 1931 and became a member of the Syndicalist-Anarchist Youth of Germany (SAJD) and the Free Workers' Union of Germany (FAUD), as the anti-authoritarian style there contrasted with the authoritarian spirit in the communist movement. In response to the Nazi movement, which was particularly violent in Wuppertal, the anarcho-syndicalists founded their own combat group, the Black Squad. The group bought some weapons, but after the police found one of the weapons in a raid near Kirschey, he was sentenced to several months in prison in 1932.

In March 1933, after the "seizure of power" by the Nazi Party, Kirschey was imprisoned again for several months and then emigrated to the Netherlands in November 1933. In August 1936 he went to Spain and initially worked in the service of the German anarcho-syndicalists in Barcelona, which had been given the task of organizing all German-speaking foreigners. In February 1937 he joined the International Company of the Durruti Column. Together with other German anarcho-syndicalists, he was arrested after armed clashes between Stalinists and anarchists in June 1937 and imprisoned in communist secret prisons in Barcelona and Valencia, and later a state prison in Segorbe until April 1938. He then stayed in France and the Netherlands until he managed to enter Sweden at the beginning of 1939, where he joined the Central Organisation of the Workers of Sweden (SAC). Nevertheless, he continued the fight against Nazism in cooperation with the International Transport Workers' Federation (ITF). In 1940 he met his future wife in Gothenburg.

In the 1950s, Kirschey separated from the syndicalist movement for political reasons and because of personal disappointments. In 1968 he joined the Communist Party of Sweden after taking a position against the invasion of Czechoslovakia by Warsaw Pact troops.

In the last years of his life, Kirschey became a public figure in Sweden and enjoyed great respect. He was a sought-after contemporary witness in schools, universities and in political youth organizations. In 1998 he published his memoirs, written by the journalist Richard Jändel, for which he received the culture award of the Swedish Workers' Education Association.

In 2006 a one-hour documentary A las barricadas about the life of Helmut Kirschey was released.

== See also ==
- Anarchism in Germany

== Literature ==
- Kirschey, Helmut; Jändel, Richard (2000). Andreas G. Graf and Dieter Nelles (ed.). "A las Barricadas". Erinnerungen und Einsichten eines Antifaschisten (in German). Bocholt und Bredevoort. ISBN 978-3980849845.
