= Raphael Friedeberg =

German physician and anarchist (1863–1940)

- Born: 14 March 1863; Tilsit, East Prussia
- Died: 16 August 1940 (aged 77); Ascona, Switzerland
- Occupation: Physician
- Political party: SPD

Raphael Friedeberg (14 March 1863 – 16 August 1940) was a German physician, socialist and anarchist.

== Early life ==
Friedeberg was born in Tilsit, East Prussia, today Sovetsk, Russia, to Salomon (a rabbi) and Rebekka Friedeberg (née Levy). He studied medicine and political economy at the University of Königsberg, but was expelled in 1887 for "abetting social democratic endeavors". Friedeberg moved to Berlin, where he worked as a private teacher and continued his studies at the University of Berlin after the sunset of the Anti-Socialist Laws in 1890, graduating in 1895.

== Social democracy ==
He worked as a general practitioner and a specialist for pulmonary disease in Berlin from 1895 to 1911. Friedeberg contributed to Sozialistischer Akademiker from early 1895 to the end of 1896, and from 1897 on, he was a member of the press commission of Sozialistische Monatshefte. Both of them were periodicals which attempted to draw intellectuals to socialism and the Social Democratic Party of Germany (SPD). Friedeberg was active in the establishment of health insurance for the working class in Berlin. The German socialist movement was just discovering the health insurance movement and starting to be active within it, both to win access to medical treatment for the working class and as a means of disseminating socialist ideas. In 1899, Friedeberg helped establish Berlin's Central Commission of Health Insurance Boards, which then organized the first Congress of German Health Insurance Boards. Additionally, he served as a member of the city council of Berlin from 1901 (or 1902 according to some sources) to 1904, making him a top SPD leader in Germany's capital.

== Anarcho-socialism ==
Soon after, however, Friedeberg started becoming increasingly disillusioned with the SPD, and particularly with the Free Trade Unions (the unions allied with that party). He became frustrated with the SPD's focus on parliamentary (rather than revolutionary action) and by the unions' political neutrality. He blamed the socialist movement's inability to gain influence (rather than just votes) after the end of the Anti-Socialist-Laws on these two policies. Friedeberg came into contact with the Free Association of German Trade Unions (FVdG), a federation, more radical than the Free Trade Unions, founded in 1897. The FVdG criticized the separation of political and labour action and opposed centralist control over the unions. Becoming increasingly influential in the FVdG, Friedeberg gave the central lecture at the federation's 1904 congress in Berlin, intervening in the mass strike debate, which was taking place in the SPD at the time, and advocating the general strike as a means of class struggle. In 1907, all members of the FVdG faced the choice of either leaving this federation and joining the centralized unions or losing their SPD membership. Friedeberg opted for the latter.

During this period, he conceived what he called "anarcho-socialism". Despite the socialist movement's growing number of supporters, he claimed little had been done to improve the conditions under which the German working class lived. One problem, said Friedeberg, was to be found in the SPD's political theory. The SPD adhered to a dogmatic interpretation of Karl Marx's writings, particularly the view that the course of history can be deduced from the state of the relations of production, that "social being determines consciousness". Though correct at the time Marx set historical materialism down, Friedeberg stated, technological development had made this view obsolete. He conceived the term historical psychism, holding that the "spiritual relations [...] have the greatest power over the material relations". The socialist movement's theoretical errors had then led to mistakes in its political strategies, according to him. The working-class opposition had become focused on gaining influence in the German parliament, the Reichstag. This had led to the "flattening out of the revolutionary movement" from a "great, all-encompassing cultural movement" to a "purely economic, even a pure stomach question". From this, he saw the need to replace political methods of class struggle with economic and psychological means. Above all, he advocated for the general strike as a means of revolutionizing society, seeing such a strike as encompassing the proletariat fighting for their own interests rather than having representatives do it for them. However, in order to be capable of doing this, proletarians must first liberate themselves from the constraining ideologies of capitalist society: namely religion, belief in laws and the state, nationalism and militarism. Friedeberg's synthesis of anarchism and socialism was criticized by anarchists and socialists alike. Erich Mühsam (1878-1934), a prominent German anarchist, dismissed historical psychism as no more than a new version of historical materialism, the "replacement of one fabricated regularity by a very similar one". Karl Kautsky (1854-1938), a leader in the SPD, on the other hand, accused Friedeberg of "theoretical confusion, which does not comprehend the necessity of the connection between politics and economy".

== Anarchism ==
He first set foot in Ascona, Switzerland in 1904 to recover from a blood infection, which led to a heart dilatation, following a carbuncle operation. Ascona had probably been recommended to him by Erich Mühsam. Not long after leaving the SPD, Friedeberg started to become disillusioned even with the FVdG. He told Fritz Kater, a leader in the FVdG, that he had drifted "further to the left". He no longer believed that radical views and tactics could be introduced to the labor movement. He started collaborating with the non-syndicalist anarchist movement, especially with the Anarchist Federation of Germany, which had been founded in 1903. He also came into contact with Swiss radicals, lecturing about the First Russian Revolution in Zurich in 1906. He started visiting Ascona frequently and also moved out of Berlin to the suburb of Friedrichshagen. In August 1907, he attended the International Anarchist Congress of Amsterdam. In 1908, he visited Peter Kropotkin in London. In 1909, he held his last large public lecture, titled "Anarchism, its Ideas and Tactics", at the Anarchist Federation of Germany's conference in Leipzig. He started turning his back on organized anarchism, moving to a more individualist understanding of anarchism. Moreover, he was by now both in poor health and deeply resigned as to the possibility of a socialist revolution. He still followed German and European politics, but felt no need to participate.

He remained the attending physician of August Bebel and Karl Kautsky.

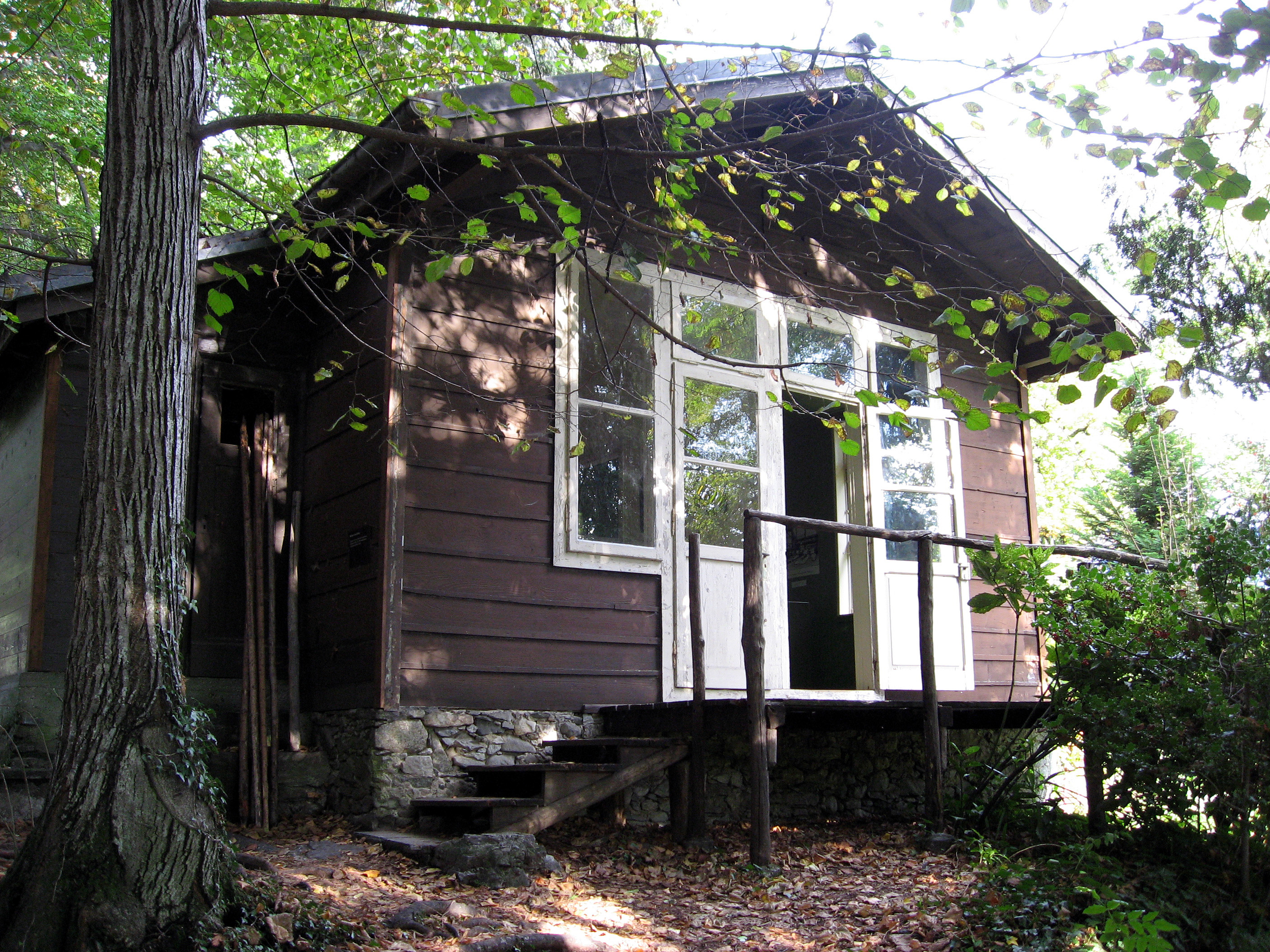
Casa Selma, a light-and-air bathing hut on Sanatorium Monte Verità

From 1911 to 1931, Friedeberg worked as a physician in the spa town of Bad Kudowa (Silesia) throughout the summer and at the natural healing Sanatorium Monte Verità in Ascona, Switzerland, in the winter. Friedeberg turned Ascona into "a center for itinerant anarchists" like Erich Mühsam (who called Monte Verità a "Saladorium") and Johannes Nohl. He introduced a "fresh air and nature therapy" and built "air huts" for his patients' recreation. The mixture of vegetarianism and anarchism attracted such visitors as Mikhail Bakunin, Peter Kropotkin, Lenin and Leo Trotsky.

In 1931, he permanently settled in Ascona. Otto Braun, former Prime Minister of Prussia, lived in his house after he escaped from Nazi Germany.

Friedeberg died in Ascona in 1940.

== See also ==
- Anarchism in Germany

== Bibliography ==
- Bock, Hans Manfred; Tennstedt, Florian (1978). "Raphael Friedeberg: Arzt und Anarchist in Ascona" [Raphael Friedeberg: Doctor and Anarchist in Ascona]. Monte Verità: Berg der Wahrheit [Monte Verità: Mountain of Truth] (in German). Milan: Electra Editrice. pp. 38–53. OCLC 5236552.
- Pierson, Stanley (1993). Marxist intellectuals and the working-class mentality in Germany. Cambridge, Massachusetts: Harvard University Press. p. 188. ISBN 0-674-55123-0.
