= Paul Czakon =

Silesian anarchist

- Paweł Czakon
- Born: 14 July 1897; Hajduki Wielkie, German Empire
- Died: 1952 (aged 54–55); Salzgitter, West Germany
- Other name: Maximo Mas
- Occupation: Locksmith
- Era: 20th century
- Organization: FAUD
- Known for: Founder of Silesian Czarne Szeregi
- Movement: Anarchism
- International Brigades
- Allegiance: CNT; FLA
- Branch: Confederal militias; Mechanized infantry
- Units: Land and Freedom Column; La Nueve
- Battles: Siege of Madrid; Battle of Teruel; Liberation of France

Paul Czakon (14 July 1897 – 1952) was a Silesian anarchist. He was a leader of the Black Band, member of the Land and Freedom Column, and participant in the French Resistance.

== Early life ==
Little is known about Czakon's early years other than that he was born on 14 July 1897 in Hajduki Wielkie. It is known that in his early twenties he was active as an anarchist and by 1919 had become the chairman of the local Beuthen organisation of the Free Workers' Union of Germany (FAUD) in the Province of Upper Silesia. As a consequence of the founding of the IWA, Czakon built up contacts with anarcho-syndicalists from Poland during the 1920s.

In 1930 Czakon founded the anti-fascist Black Band in Silesia, the activities of which would lead to his exile. In 1932 the police uncovered a secret weapons depot belonging to the Black Band, implicated in their discovery Czakon fled Silesia with two of his accomplices. With the help of a contact in the Silesian town of Kravaře, on the Czechoslovak side of the border, he obtained forged documents and was able to reach Spain. The following year he received a 15 year prison sentence in absentia.

== Spanish Civil War ==
In Spain, Czakon became one of a number of activists from across Polish, German and Czech administered Silesia who came to the defence of the Republican cause during the Spanish Civil War. Along with fellow Silesian anarchists, including Alfons Malina and Augustin Souchy, he joined the Confederación Nacional del Trabajo, becoming a commander of the Sacco-Vanzetti Battalion. He was a combatant in the Battle of Madrid and the Battle of Teruel.

== Exile and death ==
Following the defeat of the Republicans, Czakon was held in the Gurs internment camp, before joining the French Resistance. At the end of WWII he briefly returned to Silesia to find his wife who had been interned in a concentration camp. However, in order to escape further persecution under the communist regime he settled in the West German town of Salzgitter, where he died in 1952.
