= Carl Windhoff =

German syndicalist trade unionist

Carl Windhoff (1882–1940) was a German syndicalist trade unionist.

He joined the Social Democratic Party of Germany (SPD) in 1890. He was one of the most important SPD leaders Düsseldorf until he left the party in 1901. He then joined the Free Association of German Trade Unions (FVdG) and became one of its most prominent members in the Rhineland. In 1913, Fritz Kater, Karl Roche, and he were the FVdG's delegates at the First International Syndicalist Congress in London. After World War I, he was one of the leaders of the FVdG in the Ruhr region and helped re-build the organization. He became the head of the agitation committee of the Free Workers' Union of Germany (FAUD), the follow-up organization of the FVdG, in 1922. After the Nazi Machtergreifung in 1933, he was arrested in 1937 and sentenced to three years in prison. He died three years later.
