= Karl Roche =

Karl Roche (1862–1931) was a German syndicalist and left communist trade unionist. Roche joined the Free Association of German Trade Unions (FVdG) around 1900 as a seaman. He became a prominent member of the organization.

In 1913, Carl Windhoff, Fritz Kater, and he were the FVdG delegates at the First International Syndicalist Congress in London. In 1919, he wrote the FVdG's first post-World War I platform Was wollen die Syndikalisten? Programm, Ziele und Wege der "Freien Vereinigung deutscher Gewerkschaften" (What do the Syndicalists want? Program, Goals, and Means of the "Free Association of German Trade Unions"). The program summarized the FVdG's theory: a reaffirmation of the importance of strikes as a vehicle for emancipation and a rejection of the centralized mainstream labor unions. Roche was also a resolute proponent of collaboration with left communists.

In late 1918, Rudolf Rocker returned to Germany, in March 1919 he joined the FVdG and started gaining influence. An avowed communist anarchist and follower of Kropotkin, Rocker rejected such close collaboration with Marxists. His growing influence led Roche to leave the Free Workers' Union of Germany, as the FVdG was now known, in 1920 and join the General Workers' Union of Germany (AAUD). He became the leader of the AAUD in Hamburg. In the mid-1920s he left the AAUD for the Federation of Communist Anarchists of Germany and then re-joined the FAUD.
