= Fritz Köster =

German anarcho-syndicalist (1855–1934)

Fritz Köster (1855–1934) was a German anarcho-syndicalist and trade unionist.

== Biography ==
Born in 1855 in Rodenberg, Hesse (now in Lower Saxony), Köster was active in the Social Democratic Party of Germany (SPD) starting in the early 1880s. He participated in the socialist movement in Groß Ottersleben, near Magdeburg, which the Anti-Socialist Laws made illegal at the time. He was a leader in the town's trade union and was sentenced to prison multiple times, including in 1886 for three months for libel and in 1887 for eighteen months for distributing literature.

After the Anti-Socialist Laws ended in 1890, Köster joined the Jungen opposition in the Magdeburg SPD and served as Wanzleben delegate at the SPD convention. He became editor of the Magdeburger Volkstimme and was sentenced to prison again for its articles but fled in 1891 instead of serving. In Zurich, Switzerland, throughout the 1890s, he was active in various unions and the Swiss anarchist movement. Police reports called him the "leader of the Zurich anarchists".

When the German statute of limitations expired on his prior charges, Köster returned to Groß Ottersleben in January 1910 and re-joined the SPD and Gustav Landauer. Köster rallied rural workers to join the anarchist movement and led a farm workers' strike. In June 1910, the SPD moved to expel their anarchists but Köster left the party first.

In 1911, he moved to Berlin, where he started working for the weekly newspaper Die Tribüne and founded Der Pionier for the anarcho-syndicalist Free Association of German Trade Unions (FVdG). He was repeatedly sentenced and imprisoned for three months before resigning the role in late 1912 and moving to Dresden, where he became a leader in the syndicalist construction workers' union and lectured across Germany for FVdG. He also served the FVdG successor organization, the Free Workers' Union of Germany (FAUD) and continued to write for syndicalist newspapers in the 1920s, as did his wife, Aimée. He died in 1934.

== See also ==
- Anarchism in Germany
