= Black Band (resistance group) =

Anti-fascist organisation in the late Weimar Republic

- Schwarze Scharen; Czarne Szeregi
- Dates active: 1929–1933
- Country: Weimar Republic
- Ideology: Anarcho-syndicalism, insurrectionary anarchism
- Political position: Far-left
- Part of: Free Workers' Union of Germany (FAUD)

The Black Band (German: Schwarze Scharen, Polish: Czarne Szeregi) were resistance groups of anarchist and anarcho-syndicalist youth and young adults in the last years of the Weimar Republic.

== History ==
In many German cities there were small groups of the youth organization Syndicalist-Anarchist Youth of Germany (SAJD) and of the Free Workers' Union of Germany (FAUD) in the 1920s and 1930s. As a protection force against the growing National Socialist movement and disruptive communist activities, local clandestine anti-fascist organizations, known as black bands, were founded from 1929 onwards, mostly equipped with limited weapons and explosives. They dressed in a black uniform and were therefore controversial in the syndicalist and anarchist movements in which uniformity was mostly rejected. The anti-fascist formations were criticized among older comrades because black clothing represented militarization, whilst the street fighting could herald a relapse into the forms of political terrorism of the 19th century that had been overcome.

The black band became particularly strong in the Province of Upper Silesia where cadres were organised from 1929 in Beuthen, Bobrek, Gleiwitz, Katscher, Ratibor and Rosenberg. The Silesian formations were known to be able to call upon several hundred militants, although in 1932 some of their leading members, including Paul Czakon, were forced into exile after the authorities discovered their arms dump. For a number of years the black band were able to prevent attacks by the National Socialists on assemblies and in working-class areas. "Everywhere the Black Band is not only stronger than the FAUD, but also stronger than the communist workers' armed forces" reported the Upper Silesian FAUD in 1930, which wanted to promote this. The black bands were able to mobilize an average of 300–400, at most 1500, participants for their meetings. Further centers of the black bands were the Rhineland, Central Germany and the Berlin area. The founders included Theodor Bennek, Czakon, Alfons Pilarski (Upper Silesia), Walter Kaps (Berlin), Willi Paul (Kassel) and Gustav Doster (Darmstadt).

With the Machtergreifung (seizure of power) in 1933, the anarchist and anarcho-syndicalist youth organizations such as the SAJD disbanded themselves to avoid a ban and further arrests of their members, some of whom had been sent to the concentration camps. Those who had been spared either went into exile or formed an underground resistance together with older comrades. Funds were raised for imprisoned comrades, meetings were organized with other cities, courier trips were carried out and assistance was given to escape. Together with other left youth groups, slogans were painted on walls and pamphlets were printed. In the Rhineland the Gestapo uncovered the anarcho-syndicalist resistance around the turn of the year 1937 and arrested over 100 people. The young adults were taken into "protective custody", tortured and most of them convicted in 1937 for "preparing for high treason". Some were released in 1938, arrested again in 1939, sent to concentration camps and abused. Some of them died in custody. Some survivors were forced into SS special formations in 1944. Others had already gone into exile in Spain from 1936 to fight against the Nationalist faction in the Spanish Civil War.

== See also ==
- Anarchism in Germany

== Bibliography ==
- Bernardini, David (2021). "A different antifascism. An analysis of the Rise of Nazism as seen by anarchists during the Weimar period". History of European Ideas. 48 (4): 454–471. doi:10.1080/01916599.2021.1963629.
- Döhring, Helge; Kuhn, Gabriel (2018). "Schwarze Scharen: Anarcho-Syndicalist Militias in Germany, 1929-1933". Setting Sights: Histories and Reflections on Community Armed Self-Defense. PM Press. ISBN 9781629634449.
- Döhring, Helge (2012) [2004]. "The "Schwarzen Scharen"". Syndicalism and Anarcho-Syndicalism in Germany: An Introduction. Translated by Carroll, John. Bremen: Institut für Syndikalismusforschung. p. 14.
