= Der Pionier =

German socialist newspaper

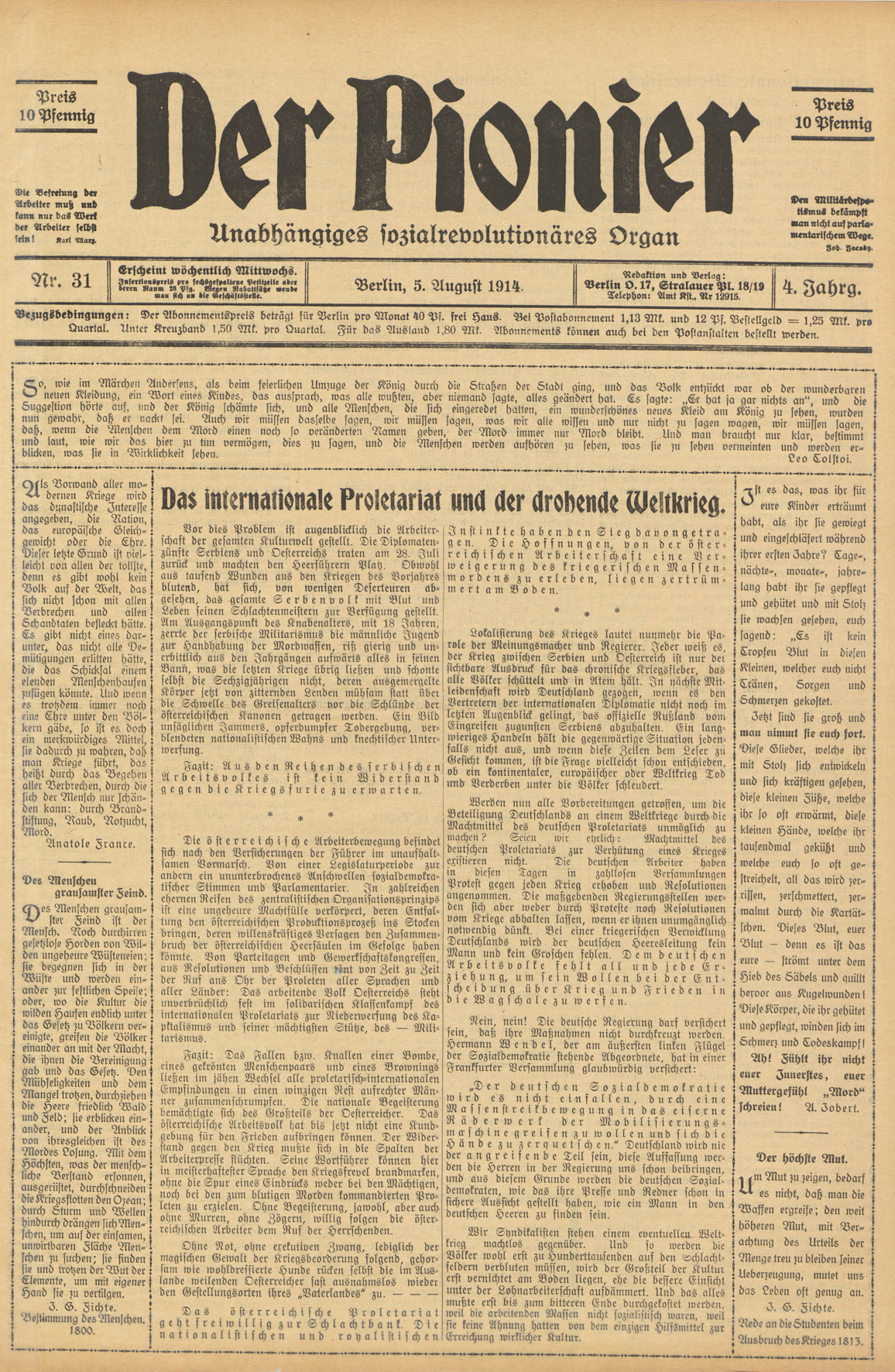
The last issue of Der Pionier

Der Pionier (English: The Pioneer) was one of two official organs of the radical socialist Free Association of German Trade Unions (FVdG).

With its founding in 1897, the FVdG also started the newspaper Einigkeit (Unity) as its official organ. As the FVdG, came into conflict with the Social Democratic Party of Germany (SPD) more and more from 1903 on, anarchists, especially Fritz Köster and Andreas Kleinlein gained influence in the union federation. After the SPD and the FVdG completely severed relations in 1908, the founding of another organ directed against the press of the SPD to convince workers to leave the party and join the FVdG was considered. The question was discussed at the FVdG congresses in 1908 and 1910 and the unionists decided to start Der Pionier.

The first issue appeared in the fall of 1911 and the newspaper was published on a weekly basis from there on. As it was edited by the anarchist Fritz Köster, Der Pionier used a much more aggressive tone than Einigkeit. By 1912, it had a circulation of 4,500 copies.

During World War I, which the FVdG rejected, both Einigkeit and Der Pionier were suppressed. On 5 August 1914, Der Pionier published article written by Max Winkler and Fritz Kater, the head of the FVdG. This article reaffirmed the FVdG's antimilitarism in the face of the SPD-affiliated unions' collaboration with the German state. This became Der Pionier's last issue.

== Bibliography ==
- Bock, Hans-Manfred (1993) [1967]. Syndikalismus und Linkskommunismus von 1918 bis 1923: Ein Beitrag zur Sozial- und Ideengeschichte der frühen Weimarer Republik (in German). Darmstadt: Wissenschaftlich Buchgesellschaft. ISBN 3-534-12005-1.
- Fricke, Dieter (1976). Die deutsche Arbeiterbewegung 1869-1914: Ein Handbuch über ihre Organisation und Tätigkeit im Klassenkampf (in German). Berlin: Dietz Verlag.
- Rübner, Hartmut (1994). Freiheit und Brot: Die Freie Arbeiter-Union Deutschlands: Eine Studie zur Geschichte des Anarchosyndikalismus (in German). Berlin/Cologne: Libertad Verlag. ISBN 3-922226-21-3.
- Thorpe, Wayne (June 2000). "Keeping the Faith: The German Syndicalists in the First World War". Central European History. 33 (2): 195–216. doi:10.1163/156916100746301. S2CID 143836877.
