= Sonia Antinori =

Italian playwright, actress and theatre director (1963–2026)

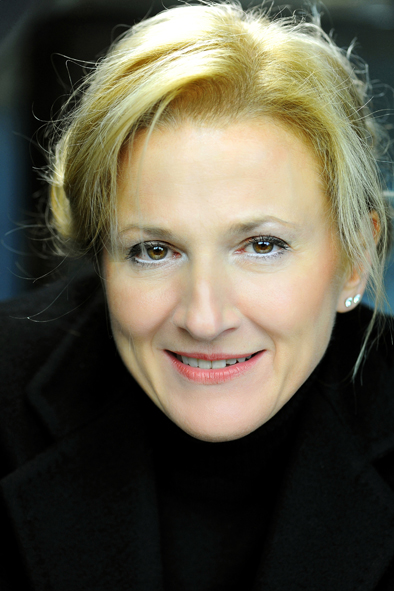
Sonia Antinori

Sonia Antinori (23 April 1963 – 28 June 2026) was an Italian playwright, stage actress, theatre director and translator.

== Early life and education ==
Born in Viareggio, she studied visual arts, theatre and ballet, graduating from the University of Florence. From 1990 on, she worked in Italy and in other countries abroad. Her plays have been presented at several festivals and theaters, broadcast and translated into, among others, German, English, French, Spanish, Polish, Bosnian, and Turkish.

== Career ==
In 1998 she took part in The Colours of the Chameleon, a residential project at the Traverse Theatre in Edinburgh with her one act play Black (directed by Nick Bone). In 1999, she was invited by the International Playwriting Festival at the Warehouse in East Croydon, where Brennan Street directed her Castle of Mud.

Antinori was also invited to take part in various international workshops and presentations (Kulturforum Graz 1996, Festival Theaterformen Braunschweig 2000, University of Mainz 2001).

She translated several plays from German and English into Italian (Arthur Schnitzler, Frank Wedekind, Ödön von Horváth, de:Kerstin Specht, Werner Schwab, Thornton Wilder, Rona Munro, Georg Büchner, Matthieu Bertholet, Gareth Armstrong, Fritz Kater, Eugene O’Neill, Dylan Thomas, Dea Loher). In 2007 her Italian version of the play Volksvernichtung by Austrian playwright Werner Schwab was awarded in Milan the it:Premio Ubu, the most prestigious Italian Theatre Prize.

Antinori taught playwriting and acting at the Scuola Holden in Turin, at the University of Venice, the University of Urbino, and the Scuola Teatri Possibili of Milan and the School of Teatro Stabile delle Marche, among many others. She also taught in several workshops in Europe, South America and Africa.

From 2006 she was developing in association with Malte on various projects and events mostly focused on site specific research in the Marche Region.

Antinori died on 28 June 2026, at the age of 63.

== Works ==
Her plays include: L'Ospite (1993), Maria Maddalena, Il sole dorme (1995), Il contagio, Berlinbabylon, Il castello di fango (Castle of Mud) (1997), Nel tempo insolito (Unusual time) (1998), Nietzsche. La danza sull’abisso (2000), Trebus o il fenomeno dell’ombra (2002), Rosa la Rossa (2003), La Controra, Matakiterangi (Occhi che guardano il cielo), La Global Comedia (2005), Terra di Mezzanotte (2006), L’astratto principio della speranza (2007), Werther Project, Buio (2010).

Her works also include novels and short stories. Her works have been printed by several publishers.

In 2013 she initiated WISE (Workshop Identity: a Story about Europe), a European Project of Testimonial Theatre about Politics and Democracy, developing a collective modular dramaturgy (Politics taught to my grandchildren – a European Bildungsroman) which has been presented in the project's four partner countries (Italy, Germany, UK, Poland).

== Books ==
- In 2012, Titivillus published her first collection of plays: 4. Trame agli angoli della Storia. Corazzano (Pisa) : Titivillus, 2012. ISBN 9788872183328
