= Anarchism in Germany =

German individualist philosopher Max Stirner became an important early influence in anarchism (German: anarchismus). Afterwards Johann Most became an important anarchist propagandist in both Germany and in the United States. In the late 19th century and early 20th century there appeared individualist anarchists influenced by Stirner such as John Henry Mackay, Adolf Brand and Anselm Ruest (Ernst Samuel) and Mynona (Salomo Friedlaender).

The anarchists Gustav Landauer, Silvio Gesell and Erich Mühsam had important leadership positions within the revolutionary councilist structures during the uprising at the late 1910s known as Bavarian Soviet Republic. During the rise of Nazi Germany, Erich Mühsam was assassinated in a Nazi concentration camp both for his anarchist positions and for his Jewish background. The anarcho-syndicalist activist and writer Rudolf Rocker became an influential personality in the establishment of the international federation of anarcho-syndicalist organizations called International Workers' Association as well as the Free Workers' Union of Germany.

Contemporary German anarchist organizations include the anarcho-syndicalist Free Workers' Union and the Federation of German speaking Anarchists (Föderation Deutschsprachiger AnarchistInnen).

== History ==
=== Precursors ===
Historians often trace the roots of German anarchism back to the 16th century German Peasants' War, though historians of anarchism James Joll and George Woodcock hold that this link is exaggerated. The liberal thinking of Friedrich Schiller, Johann Wolfgang von Goethe, Gotthold Ephraim Lessing, and Heinrich Heine is also held as a precursor to German anarchism, as well as the anarchist tendencies of several German socialists of this period. The young Wilhelm Weitling, influenced by both Proudhon and Louis Auguste Blanqui, once wrote that "a perfect society has no government, but only an administration, no laws, but only obligations, no punishment, but means of correction." Moses Hess was also an anarchist until around 1844, disseminating Proudhon's theories in Germany, but would go on to write the anti-anarchist pamphlet Die letzte Philosophie. Karl Grün, well known for his role in the disputes between Marx and Proudhon, held a view historian Max Nettlau would liken to communist anarchism while still living in Cologne and then left for Paris, where he became a disciple of Proudhon. Wilhelm Marr, born in Hamburg but primarily active in the Young Germany clubs in Switzerland, edited several antiauthoritarian periodicals. In his book on anarchism Anarchie oder Autorität, he comes to the conclusion that liberty is found only in anarchy.

German anarchists such as Nettlau and Gustav Landauer credited Edgar Bauer with founding the anarchist tradition in Germany.

=== Johann Most ===
As the 1860s drew to a close, Johann Most was won over to the ideas of the emerging international socialism movement. Most saw in the doctrines of Karl Marx and Ferdinand Lassalle a blueprint for a new egalitarian society and became a fervent supporter of the Social Democracy, as the Marxist movement was known in the day.

After advocating violent action, including the use of explosive bombs, as a mechanism to bring about revolutionary change, Most was forced into exile by the government. He went to France but was forced to leave at the end of 1878, settling in London. There he founded his own newspaper, Freiheit (Freedom), in 1879. Convinced by his own experience of the futility of parliamentary action, Most began to espouse the doctrine of anarchism, which led to his expulsion from the German Social Democratic Party in 1880.

=== German individualist anarchism ===
The philosophy of Max Stirner, a German, is usually called "egoism" and rejects political systems in favor of living without regard to others. Stirner held that the only limitation on the rights of the individual is his power to obtain what he desires without regard for God, state, or morality. He proposes that most commonly accepted social institutions—including the notion of State, property as a right, natural rights in general, and the very notion of society—were figments (spooks) in the mind. Stirner wanted to abolish both state and societal responsibility for its people. Stirner's egoism and The Ego and Its Own (1844) were foundational to the development of individualist anarchism.

The philosophy of Friedrich Nietzsche, A German individualist held many Anarchist ideas and was in favor of more radical ways to personal liberation.

The Scottish-born John Henry Mackay became Germany's most important individualist anarchist propagandist. He fused Stirnerist egoism with the positions of Benjamin Tucker and translated Tucker into German. Two semi-fictional writings of his own Die Anarchisten and Der Freiheitsucher contributed to individualist theory, updating egoist themes with respect to the anarchist movement. His writing were translated into English as well.

The German Stirnerite and pioneer campaigner for male bisexuality and homosexuality, Adolf Brand, published the world's first ongoing homosexual publication, Der Eigene, in 1896.

=== 20th century ===
In the German uprising known as the Bavarian Soviet Republic the anarchists Gustav Landauer, Silvio Gesell and Erich Mühsam had important leadership positions within the revolutionary councilist structures.

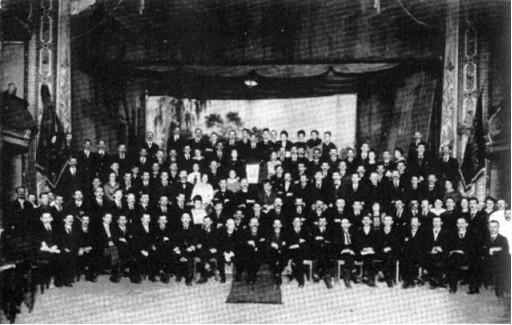
Congress of 1922 of the Free Workers' Union of Germany

Rudolf Rocker returned to Germany in November 1918 upon an invitation from Fritz Kater to re-build the Free Association of German Trade Unions (FVdG). The FVdG was a radical labor federation that quit the SPD in 1908 and became increasingly syndicalist and anarchist. During World War I, it had been unable to continue its activities for fear of government repression, but remained in existence as an underground organization. Rocker was opposed to the FVdG's alliance with the communists during and immediately after the November Revolution, as he rejected Marxism, especially the concept of the dictatorship of the proletariat. The FVdG grew rapidly and the coalition with the communists soon began to crumble. Syndicalist members of the Communist Party were expelled. The organization became the Free Workers' Union of Germany (FAUD) in 1919 under a new platform written by Rocker—the Prinzipienerklärung des Syndikalismus (Declaration of Syndicalist Principles)—that rejected political parties, nationalization, the dictatorship of the proletariat, and the communist state. The program only recognized de-centralized, purely economic organizations.

On Gustav Landauer's death during the Munich Soviet Republic uprising, Rocker took over the work of editing the German publications of Kropotkin's writings. In 1920, the social democratic Defense Minister Gustav Noske started the suppression of the revolutionary left, which led to the imprisonment of Rocker and Fritz Kater. During their mutual detainment, Rocker convinced Kater, who had still held some social democratic ideals, completely of anarchism. In the following years, Rocker became one of the most regular writers in the FAUD organ Der Syndikalist. The FAUD hosted an international syndicalist conference in 1920 that led to the founding of the International Workers' Association (IWA) in December 1922. Augustin Souchy, Alexander Schapiro, and Rocker became the organization's secretaries and Rocker wrote its platform.

Germany's syndicalist movement declined in the mid-1920s. The FAUD reached its peak of around 150,000 members in 1921 before losing members to both the Communist and the Social Democratic Party. In the 1930 elections, the Nazi Party received 18.3% of all votes, a total of 6 million. Rocker was worried: "Once the Nazis get to power, we'll all go the way of Landauer and Eisner" (who were killed by reactionaries in the course of the Munich Soviet Republic uprising). Rocker left Germany after the Reichstag fire, receiving news of Erich Mühsam's arrest as they left.

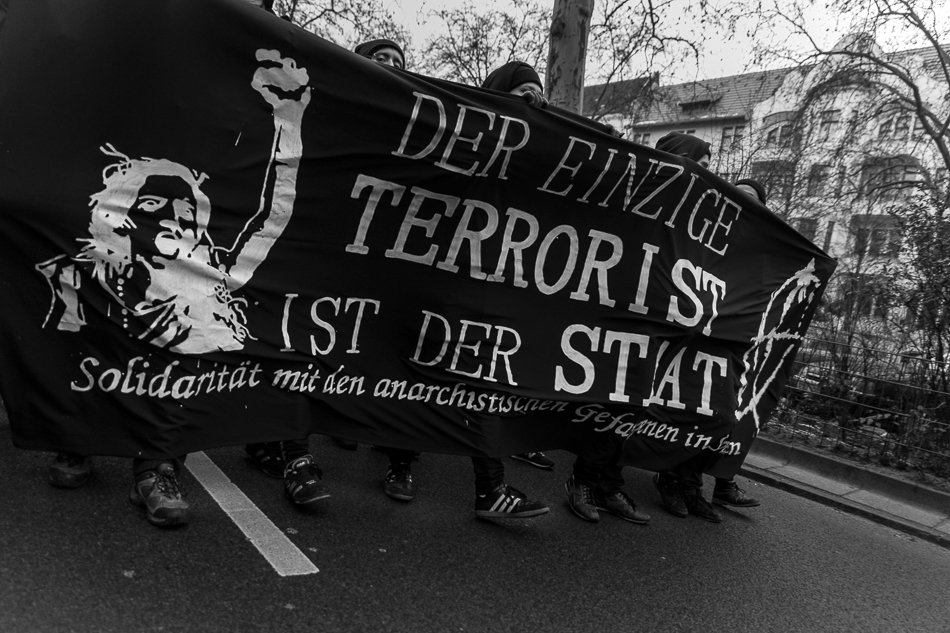
Anarchists in Germany marching in support of Catalan anarchists

After World War II, an appeal in the Fraye Arbeter Shtime detailed the plight of German anarchists and called for Americans to support them. By February 1946, the sending of aid parcels to anarchists in Germany was a large-scale operation. In 1947, Rocker published Zur Betrachting der Lage in Deutschland (Regarding the Portrayal of the Situation in Germany) about the impossibility of another anarchist movement in Germany. It became the first post-World War II anarchist writing to be distributed in Germany. Rocker thought young Germans were all either totally cynical or inclined to fascism and awaited a new generation to grow up before anarchism could bloom once again in the country. Nevertheless, the Federation of Libertarian Socialists (FFS) was founded in 1947 by former FAUD members. Rocker wrote for its organ, Die Freie Gesellschaft, which survived until 1953.

East Germany carried out hundreds of arrests against anarcho-syndicalists in 1948–49, the leader Wilhelm Jelinek was murdered in prison in 1952.

== Contemporary ==
German authorities have tried to evict anarchist communities and squats that are the base of anarchist support. During the 2020 pandemic German authorities forcefully evicted Liebig 34, an anarchist autonomous zone. This resulted in clashes with police and riots, as well as large demonstrations in support of Liebig 34. Residents of Liebig 34 were later forcefully removed by German police.

== See also ==
- Category:German anarchists
- List of anarchist movements by region
- Anarchism in Austria
- Anarchism in the Netherlands

== Bibliography ==
- Bartsch, Günter (1972). Anarchismus in Deutschland: 1945–1965 (in German). Hanover: Fackelträger-Verlag. ISBN 3-7716-1331-0.
- Bartsch, Günter (1973). Anarchismus in Deutschland: 1965–1973 (in German). Hanover: Fackelträger-Verlag. ISBN 3-7716-1351-5.
- Bartsch, Günter (1978). "Entwicklung und Organisationen des deutschen Anarchismus von 1945 bis zur Gegenwart: Ein Überblick". In Funke, Manfred (ed.). Extremismus im demokratischen Rechtsstaat: ausgewählte Texte und Materialien zur aktuellen Diskussion. Schriftenreihe der Bundeszentrale für Politische Bildung. Vol. 122. London: Bundeszentrale für politische Bildung. pp. 147–163. ISBN 3-921352-23-1.
- Bock, Hans-Manfred (1993) [1967]. Syndikalismus und Linkskommunismus von 1918 bis 1923: Ein Beitrag zur Sozial- und Ideengeschichte der frühen Weimarer Republik (in German). Darmstadt: Wissenschaftliche Buchgesellschaft. ISBN 3-534-12005-1.
- Bock, Hans-Manfred (1973). "Bibliographischer Versuch zur Geschichte des Anarchismus und Anarcho-Syndikalismus in Deutschland". In Funke, Manfred (ed.). Über Karl Korsch. Jahrbuch der Arbeiterbewegung (in German). Vol. 1. Frankfurt am Main: Fischer-Taschenbuch-Verlag. pp. 294–334. ISBN 3-436-01793-0.
- Bock, Hans-Manfred (1976). Geschichte des "linken Radikalismus" in Deutschland: ein Versuch (in German). Frankfurt am Main: Suhrkamp. ISBN 3-518-00645-2.
- Botz, Gerhard; Brandstetter, Gerfried; Pollak, Michael (1977). Im Schatten der Arbeiterbewegung: zur Geschichte des Anarchismus in Österreich und Deutschland (in German). Vienna: Europaverlag. ISBN 3-203-50628-9.
- Carlson, Andrew R. (1972). Anarchism in Germany: the early movement. Metuchen, NJ: Scarecrow Press. ISBN 0-8108-0484-0.
- Carlson, Andrew (1982). "Anarchism and individual terror in the German Empire, 1870–90". In Mommsen, Wolfgang J (ed.). Social protest, violence and terror in nineteenth- and twentieth-century Europe. London: Macmillan. pp. 175–200. ISBN 0-312-73471-9.
- Cohn, Jesse (2009). "Anarchism, Germany". In Ness, Immanuel (ed.). The International Encyclopedia of Revolution and Protest. Malden, Ma: Wiley-Blackwell. ISBN 978-1-4051-8464-9.
- Degen, Hans Jürgen (2002). Anarchismus in Deutschland 1945–1960: die Föderation Freiheitlicher Sozialisten (in German). Ulm: Klemm und Oelschläger. ISBN 3-932577-37-X.
- Drücke, Bernd (1998). Zwischen Schreibtisch und Straßenschlacht? Anarchismus und libertäre Presse in Ost- und Westdeutschland (in German). Ulm: Klemm & Oelschläger. ISBN 3-932577-05-1.
- Fähnders, Walter (1987). Anarchismus und Literatur: Ein vergessenes Kapitel deutscher Literaturgeschichte zwischen 1890 und 1910 (in German). Stuttgart: Metzler. ISBN 3-476-00622-0.
- Gabriel, Elun (2003). Anarchism and the political culture of imperial Germany, 1870–1914 (PhD thesis). University of California, Davis. OCLC 53980701.
- Gabriel, Elun (2010). "The Left Liberal Critique of Anarchism in Imperial Germany". German Studies Review. 33 (2). Tempe: Arizona State University: 331–350. ISSN 0149-7952.
- Gabriel, Elun (2011). "Anarchism's Appeal to German Workers, 1878–1914". Journal for the Study of Radicalism. 5 (1). East Lansing: Michigan State University Press: 33–65. doi:10.1353/jsr.2011.0000. ISSN 1930-1189. S2CID 144388229.
- Graf, Andreas G. (2001). Anarchisten gegen Hitler : Anarchisten, Anarcho-Syndikalisten, Rätekommunisten in Widerstand und Exil (in German). Berlin: Lukas-Verlag.
- Jenrich, Holger (1988). Anarchistische Presse in Deutschland 1945 – 1985 (in German). Grafenau-Döffingen: Trotzdem-Verlag. ISBN 3-922209-75-0.
- Kley, Martin Michael (2008). All work and no play?: Labor, literature, and industrial modernity on the Weimar left (PhD thesis). University of Texas, Austin. OCLC 243797442.
- Linse, Ulrich (1969a). Organisierter Anarchismus im Deutschen Kaiserreich von 1871 (in German). Berlin: Duncker Humblot.
- Linse, Ulrich (1969b). "Der deutsche Anarchismus 1870–1918". Geschichte in Wissenschaft und Unterricht (in German) (20). Stuttgart: Friedrich Verlag: 513–519. ISSN 0016-9056. OCLC 473322316.
- Linse, Ulrich (1989). "Die "Schwarzen Scharen": Eine antifaschistische Kampforganisation deutscher Anarchisten". Archiv für die Geschichte des Widerstandes und der Arbeit (in German). 12. Fernwald: Germinal Verlag: 47–67. ISBN 978-3-88663-412-5.
- Neubert, Ehrhart (1998). Geschichte der Opposition in der DDR: 1949–1989 (in German). Berlin: Links-Verlag. ISBN 3-86153-163-1.
- Riley, Thomas A. (1945). "New England Anarchism in Germany". New England Quarterly. 18 (1). Cambridge, Ma: MIT Press: 25–38. doi:10.2307/361389. ISSN 0028-4866. JSTOR 361389. S2CID 147274338.
- Rothfels, Hans (July 1951). "Review: Die Entscheidung des Abendlandes by Rudolf Rocker". American Historical Review. 56 (4). Washington: American Historical Association: 839–841. doi:10.2307/1851988. ISSN 0002-8762. JSTOR 1851988. OCLC 1830326.
- Rübner, Hartmut (2007). "Rocker, Rudolf". Datenbank des deutschsprachigen Anarchismus (in German).
- Schmück, Jochen (1992). "Der deutschsprachige Anarchismus und seine Presse". Archiv für die Geschichte des Widerstandes und der Arbeit (in German). 12. Fernwald: Germinal Verlag: 177–190. ISBN 978-3-88663-412-5.
- Vallance, Margaret (July 1973). "Rudolf Rocker – a biographical sketch". Journal of Contemporary History. 8 (3). London/Beverly Hills: Sage Publications: 75–95. doi:10.1177/002200947300800304. ISSN 0022-0094. OCLC 49976309. S2CID 159569041.
- Vogel, Angela (1977). Der deutsche Anarcho-Syndikalismus: Genese und Theorie einer vergessenen Bewegung (in German). Berlin: Karin Kramer Verlag. ISBN 3-87956-070-6.
- Woodcock, George (1962). Anarchism: a history of libertarian ideas and movements. New York: New American Library.
