= Chorzów Batory =

- Chorzów District
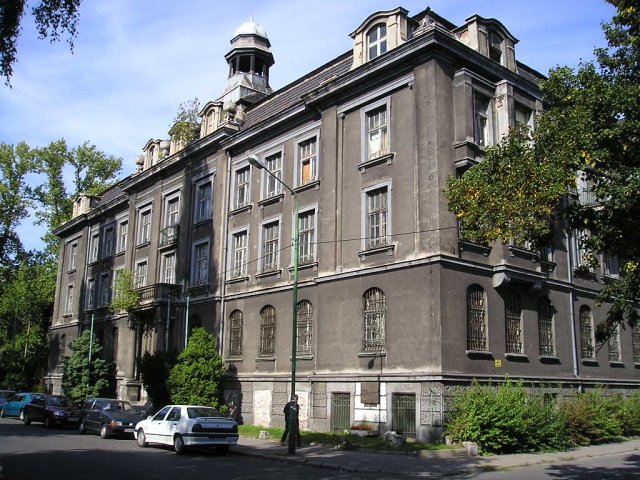
- Town hall of the former independent municipality of Hajduki Wielkie, now unused.

- Location of Chorzów Batory within Chorzów
- Coordinates: 50.2833333°N 18.95°E
- Country: Poland
- Voivodeship: Silesian
- County/City: Chorzów
- Time zone: UTC+1 (CET)
  - Summer (DST): UTC+2 (CEST)
- Area code: (+48) 032

Chorzów Batory (formerly Bismarckhütte, Hajduki Wielkie, 1941–1945 Königshütte-Bismarck) is a district of the Polish city of Chorzów, in Silesian Voivodeship. Until early 1939, it was a separate municipality. One of the most renowned football clubs in Poland, Ruch Chorzów, is based there.

== History ==
The settlement Hajduki was established in the late 16th or early 17th century when the local area belonged to the Habsburg monarchy. In the War of the Austrian Succession most of Silesia was conquered by the Kingdom of Prussia, including the village. In 1873 the steel mill „Bismarckhütte” was opened (in 1933 renamed to „Huta Batory”) and other industrial establishment, as well as the population growth, followed. In the years 1898-1901 the Roman Catholic Saint Mary's church was built, a seat of a separate parish since 1908. In 1903 the two municipalities Hajduki Dolne (Nieder-Heiduk) i Hajduki Górne (Ober-Heiduk) were joined to form the municipality of Bismarckhütte. After World War I the territory became disputed between Germany and Poland and witnessed the three Silesian Uprisings and the plebiscite after which the settlement became part of Poland. The official change of the name from Bismarckhütte to Hajduki Wielkie took place on 19 June 1922. The municipality was merged with the town of Chorzów on 1 April 1939.

== Notable people ==
- Paul Czakon (1897–1952), a Silesian anarchist.
- Leo Gburek (1910 in Bismarckhütte – 1941 in Fair Isle, Shetland), a German geophysicist and a member of the German Antarctic Expedition (1938–1939), buried at Cannock Chase German Military Cemetery.
- Joseph Kotalla (1908-1979), a German war criminal

== Gallery ==
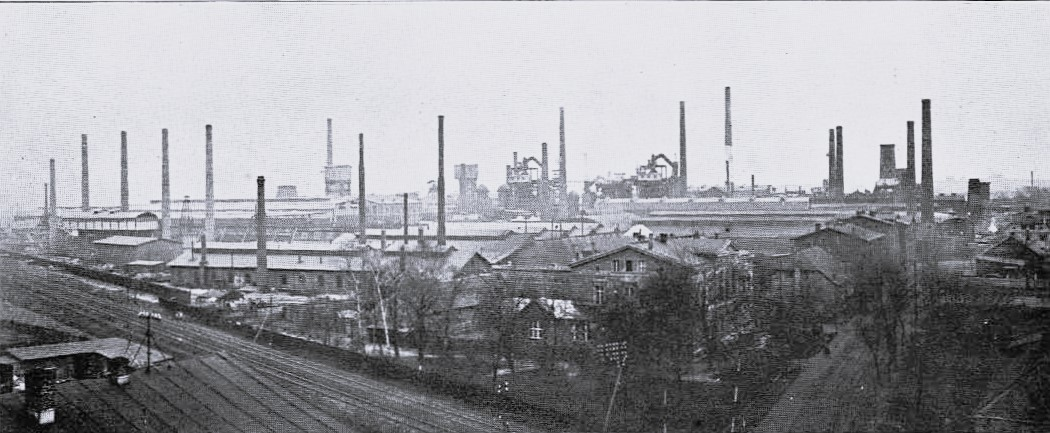
Bismarckhütte Steel mill in 1908

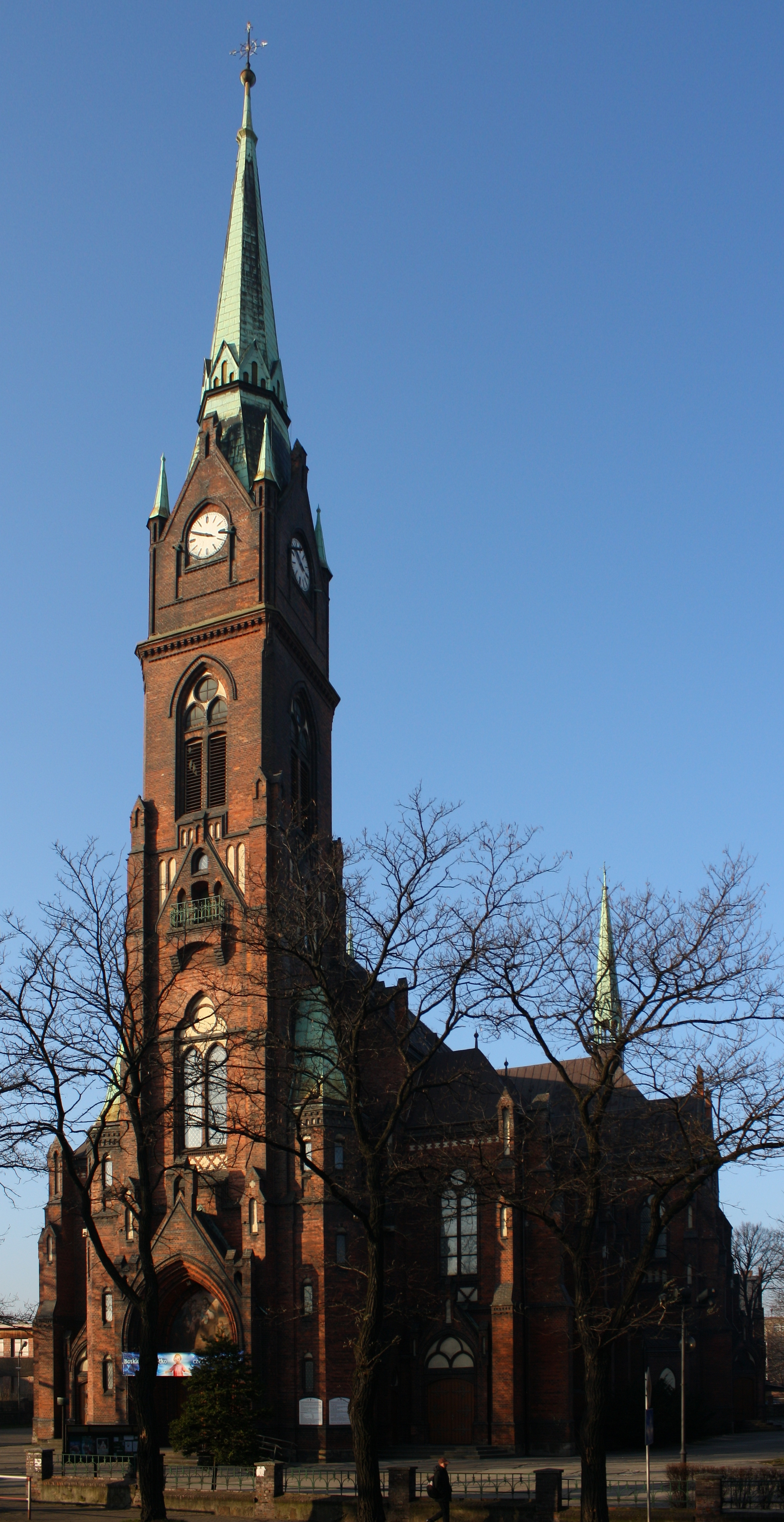
Saint Mary's church

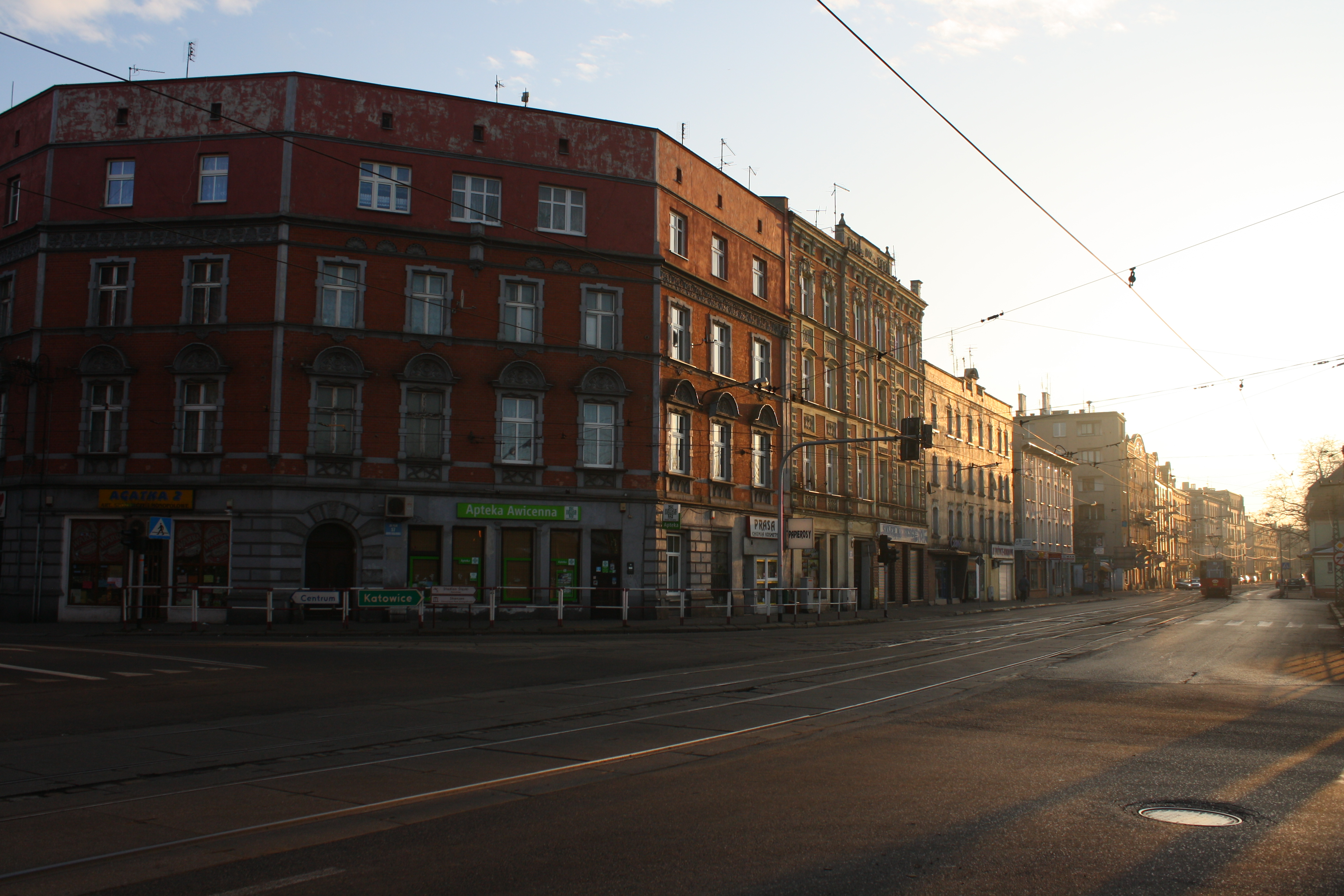
Armia Krajowa's Street

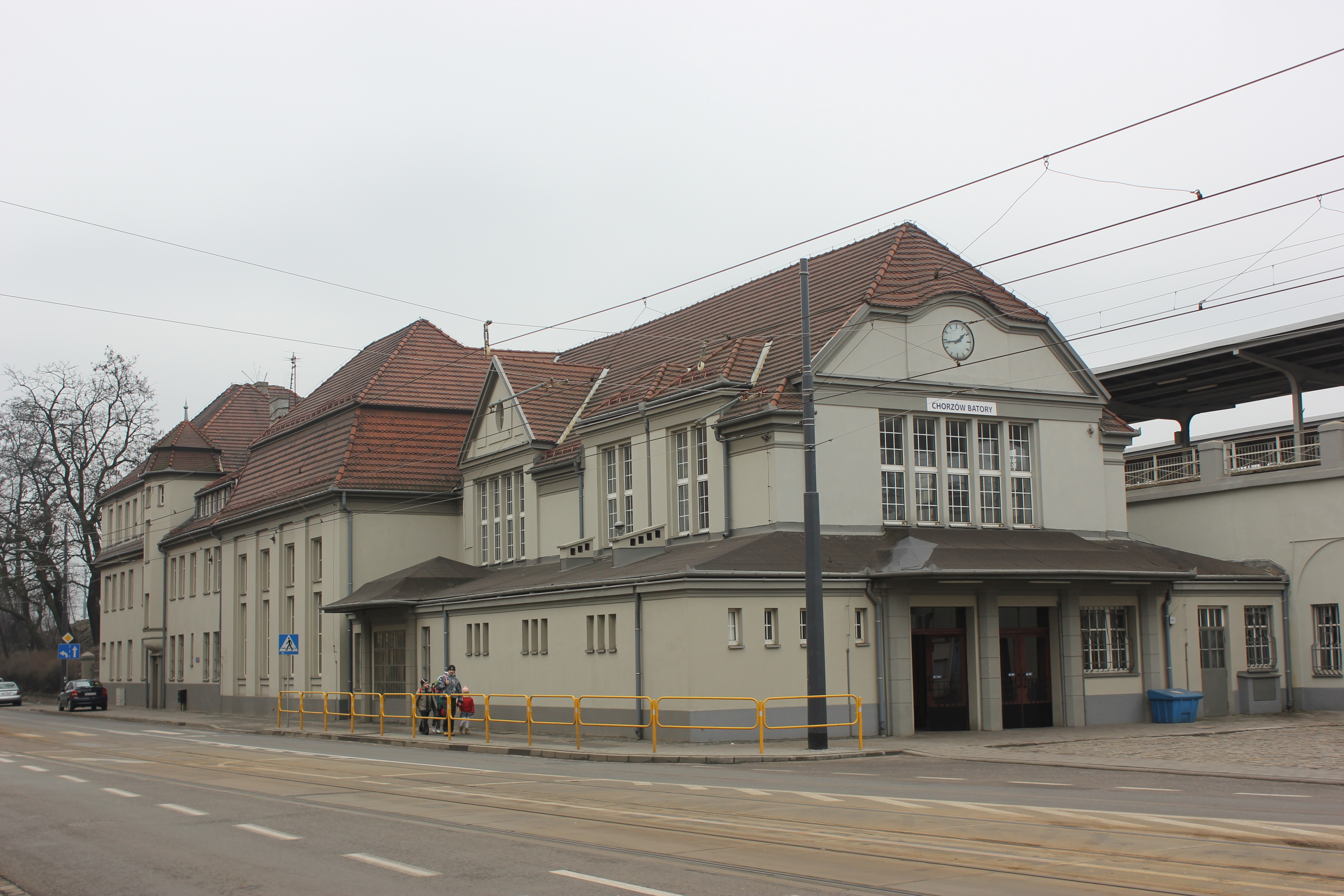
Train Station

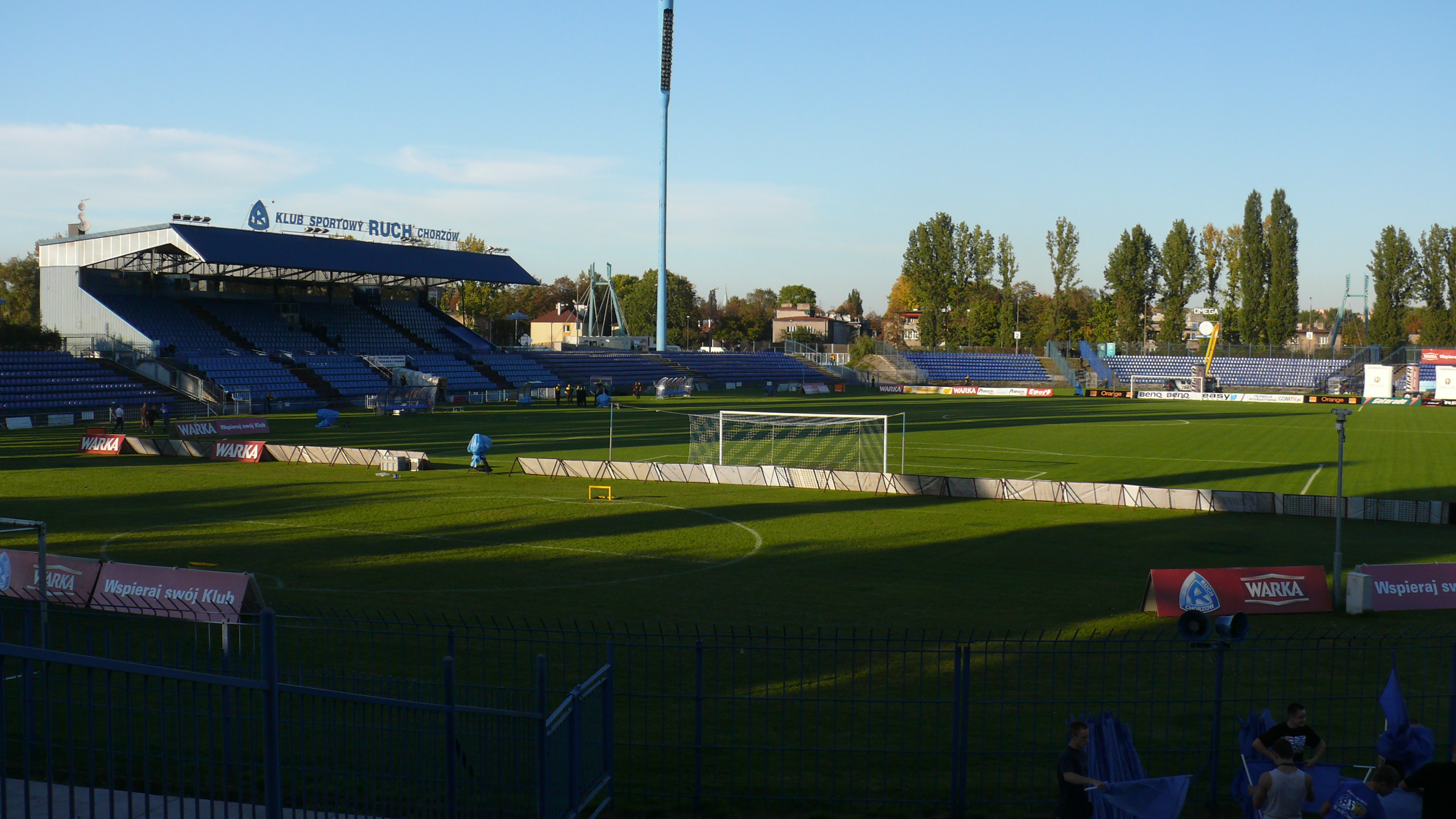
Stadion Miejski
