= Die Einigkeit =

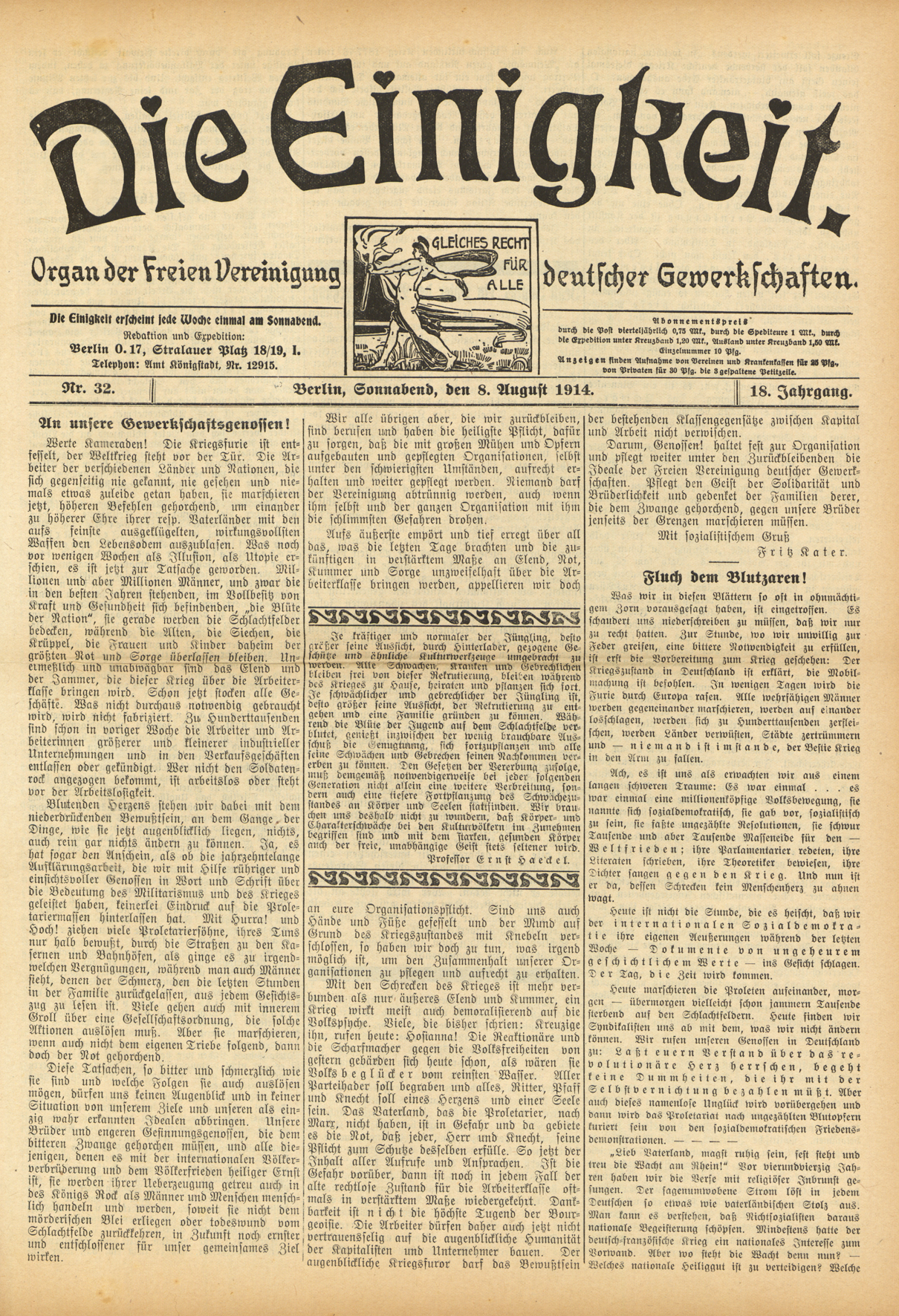
The final issue of Die Einigkeit, 8 August 1914

Die Einigkeit (German for The Unity) was a German newspaper, which appeared from 19 June 1897 to 8 August 1914. It was the organ of the radical socialist Free Association of German Trade Unions (FVdG). Its original editor was Gustav Kessler, but he was replaced by Fritz Kater after his death in 1904.

The FVdG's founding congress in Halle in 1897 decided to publish a newspaper fortnightly under the name Solidarität (Solidarity). Some trade unions in the federation required their members to subscribe to Einigkeit, while most did not. A year later, the title was changed to Die Einigkeit. Organ der lokalorganisierten und durch Vertrauensmänner zentralisierten Gewerkschaften Deutschlands, which was changed to Einigkeit. Organ der Freien Vereinigung deutscher Gewerkschaften in 1901, the year the federation was renamed to Free Association of German Trade Unions. On 1 April 1898 the newspaper started being published on a weekly basis. In 1897, the newspaper had a circulation of 2,650, a number, which steadily increased, reaching over 10,000 in 1900, and a peak circulation of over 13,500 in 1906. A loss of members of the FVdG decreased Die Einigkeit's popularity after that.

In 1911, the FVdG started publishing a second weekly newspaper, Der Pionier, which had a circulation of 4,500 in 1912.

During World War I, both Die Einigkeit and Der Pionier were banned by the German authorities.
