= Anarchism in Germany (book) =

1972 book by Raymond R. Carlson

- Title page for Anarchism in Germany (1972)
- Author: Raymond R. Carlson
- Subject: History of anarchism, anarchism in Germany
- Publisher: Scarecrow Press
- Publication date: 1972
- Pages: 448
- ISBN: 9780810804845

Anarchism in Germany, volume 1, The Early Movement is a 1972 book by Raymond R. Carlson on the history of anarchism in Germany.

== Bibliography ==
- Droz, Jacques (1974). "Review of Organisierter Anarchismus im Deutschen Kaiserreich von 1871 (Beiträge zu einer historischen Strukturanalyse Bayerns im Industriezeitalter, Bd. 3); Anarchism in Germany, vol. I : The Early Movement". Revue Historique. 251 (2 (510)): 492–494. ISSN 0035-3264. JSTOR 40953053.
- Joll, James (1974). "Review of Anarchism in Germany. Vol. I: The Early Movement; Anarchismus in Deutschland. Band 1: 1945-1965". Historische Zeitschrift. 218 (1): 157–159. ISSN 0018-2613. JSTOR 27618278.
- Landauer, Carl (1973). "Review of Anarchism in Germany. Volume 1, The Early Movement". The American Historical Review. 78 (2): 461–462. doi:10.2307/1861243. ISSN 0002-8762. JSTOR 1861243.
- Sheehan, James J. (1973). "Review of Anarchism in Germany". The Journal of Modern History. 45 (3): 525. ISSN 0022-2801. JSTOR 1879181.
- Wozniak, John Stanley (1973). "Review of Anarchism in Germany, Vol. 1, The Early Movement". The Annals of the American Academy of Political and Social Science. 405: 188. ISSN 0002-7162. JSTOR 1040251.
