= Free Association of German Trade Unions =

Trade union federation in Imperial and early Weimar Germany

FVdG
- Free Association of German Trade Unions
- Freie Vereinigung deutscher Gewerkschaften
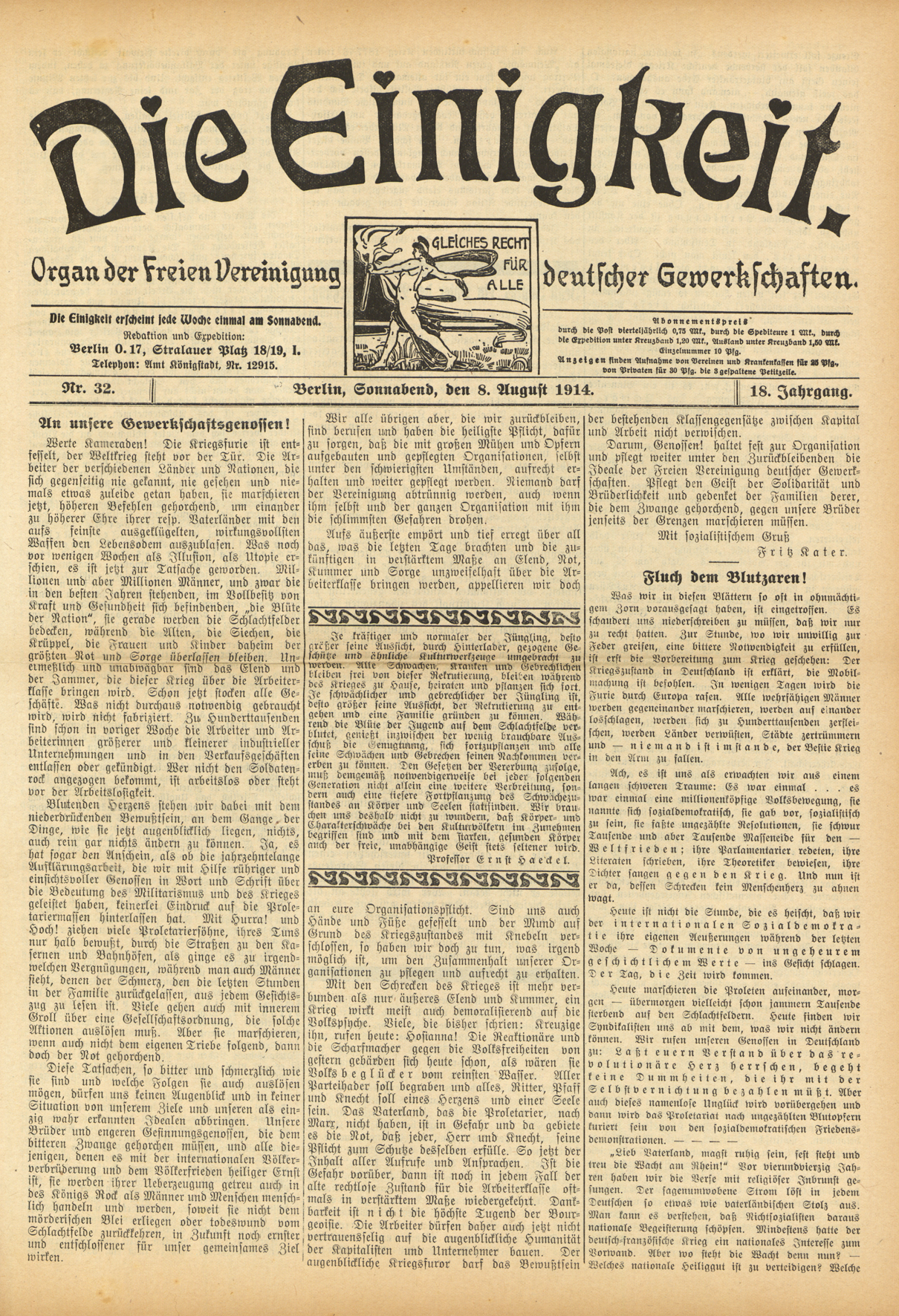
- Re-founded as: Free Workers' Union of Germany
- Founded: 1897; 129 years ago
- Dissolved: 1919; 107 years ago
- Headquarters: Berlin
- Location: Germany
- Members: 1897: 6,803; 1900: 19,752; 1903: 17,061; 1906: 16,662; 1910: 6,454; 1914: 6,000; August 1919: 60,000; December 1919: 111,675
- Key people: Raphael Friedeberg; Fritz Kater; Gustav Keßler; Fritz Köster; Rudolf Rocker

The Free Association of German Trade Unions (German: Freie Vereinigung deutscher Gewerkschaften; abbreviated FVdG; sometimes also translated as Free Association of German Unions or Free Alliance of German Trade Unions) was a trade union federation in Imperial and early Weimar Germany. It was founded in 1897 in Halle under the name Representatives' Centralization of Germany as the national umbrella organization of the localist current of the German labor movement. The localists rejected the centralization in the labor movement following the sunset of the Anti-Socialist Laws in 1890 and preferred grassroots democratic structures. The lack of a strike code soon led to conflict within the organization. Various ways of providing financial support for strikes were tested before a system of voluntary solidarity was agreed upon in 1903, the same year that the name Free Association of German Trade Unions was adopted.

During the years following its formation, the FVdG began to adopt increasingly radical positions. During the German socialist movement's debate over the use of mass strikes, the FVdG advanced the view that the general strike must be a weapon in the hands of the working class. The federation believed the mass strike was the last step before a socialist revolution and became increasingly critical of parliamentary action. Disputes with the mainstream labor movement finally led to the expulsion of FVdG members from the Social Democratic Party of Germany (SPD) in 1908 and the complete severing of relations between the two organizations. Anarchist and especially syndicalist positions became increasingly popular within the FVdG. During World War I, the FVdG rejected the SPD's and mainstream labor movement's cooperation with the German state—known as the Burgfrieden—but was unable to organize any significant resistance to or continue its regular activities during the war. Immediately after the November Revolution, the FVdG very quickly became a mass organization. It was particularly attractive to miners from the Ruhr area opposed to the mainstream unions' reformist policies. In December 1919, the federation merged with several minor left communist unions to become the Free Workers' Union of Germany (FAUD).

== Background ==
According to Angela Vogel and Hartmut Rübner, Carl Hillmann, a typesetter and prominent trade unionist in the 1870s, was the "intellectual father" of the localist and anarcho-syndicalist movement. Vogel's and Rübner's claim is based on the fact that Hillmann was the first in Germany to consider unions' primary role to be the creation of the conditions for a socialist revolution, not simply to improve workers' living conditions. He also advocated a de-centralized trade union federation structure. Many of the later anarcho-syndicalists including Rudolf Rocker agree with this notion. Hans Manfred Bock, on the other hand, sees no evidence for Hillmann's influence on the FVdG.

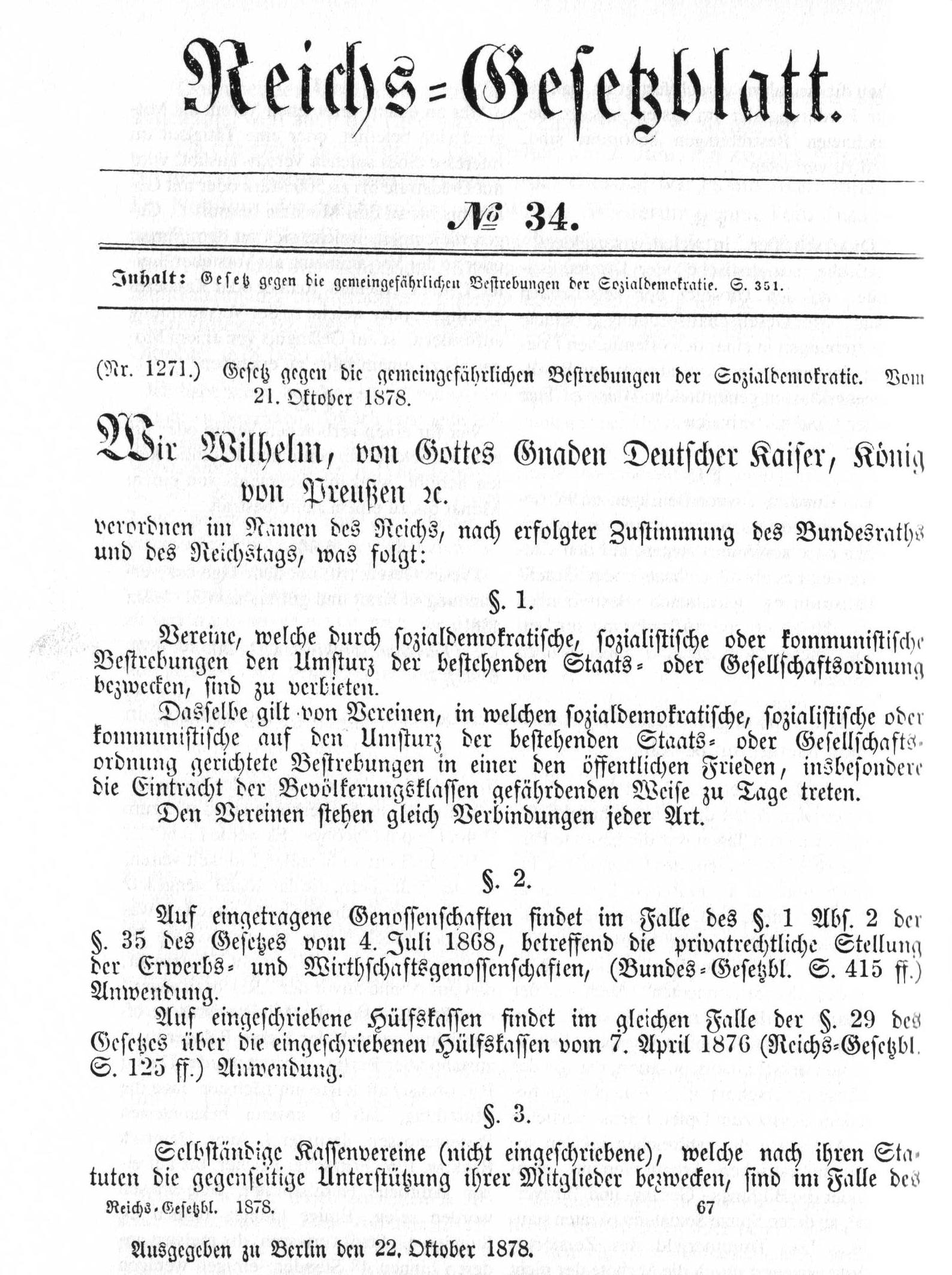
Official publication of the first Anti-Socialist Law, 1878

From 1878 to 1890, the Anti-Socialist Laws forbade all socialist trade unions. Only small local organizations, which communicated via intermediaries such as stewards, who worked illegally or semi-legally, survived. This form of organization was easier to protect against state repression. After the laws were sunset in 1890, the General Commission of the Trade Unions of Germany was founded on November 17 at a conference in Berlin to centralize the socialist labor movement. In 1892, the Trade Union Congress of Halberstadt was held to organize the many local unions under the committee. The localists, 31,000 of whom were represented at the congress, wanted to retain many of the changes that had been adopted during the repressive period. For example, they opposed separate organizations for political and economic matters, such as the party and the trade union. They especially wanted to keep their grassroots democratic structures. They also advocated local trade unions being networked by delegates rather than ruled centrally, and were wary of bureaucratic structures. The localists' proposals were rejected at the Halberstadt congress, so they refused to join the centralized trade unions, which became known as the Free Trade Unions. They did not renounce social democracy, but rather considered themselves to be an avant-garde within the social democratic movement in Germany.

The localists' main stronghold was in Berlin, although localist unions existed in the rest of the Empire as well. Masons, carpenters, and some metal-working professions—especially those requiring a higher degree of qualification like coppersmiths or gold and silver workers—were represented in large numbers. By 1891, there were at least 20,000 metal workers in localist trade unions, just as many as in the centralized German Metal Workers' Union.

== Founding ==
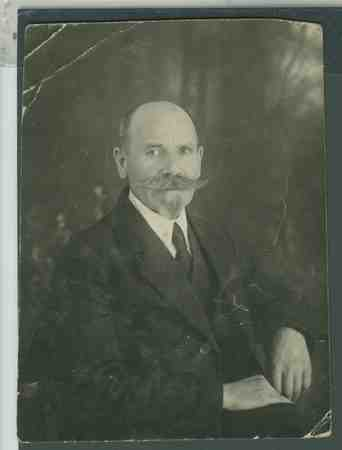
Fritz Kater

At a congress in 1897 in Halle, the localists founded a national organization of their own, the Representatives' Centralization of Germany (Vertrauensmänner-Zentralisation Deutschlands). The congress was originally supposed to take place a year earlier, but a lack of interest forced it to be postponed. There were 37 delegates at the congress representing 6,803 union members. Nearly two-thirds of the delegates came from Berlin or Halle. Almost half the delegates worked in the construction industry, while 14 delegates came from highly specialized professions. The congress decided to establish a five-person Business Commission seated in Berlin to organize political actions, aid in communication between local organizations, and raise financial support for strikes. Fritz Kater became the chairman of the commission. A newspaper, Solidarität (Solidarity), was founded, but the name was changed to Die Einigkeit (Unity) the following year. It initially appeared fortnightly, but was published on a weekly basis beginning in 1898.

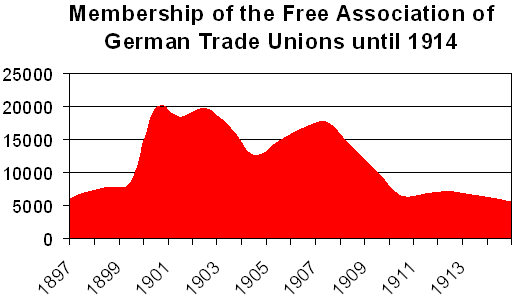
Number of members in the FVdG before WWI

The decision to found a national organization was likely the result of several factors. First, the mainstream trade unions were increasingly reformist and centralized. Second, the localists gained confidence from their involvement in the dock workers' strike in Hamburg in late 1896 and early 1897. Third, loss of membership (for example, the Berlin metal workers rejoined the DMV in 1897) convinced the localists of the need for action.

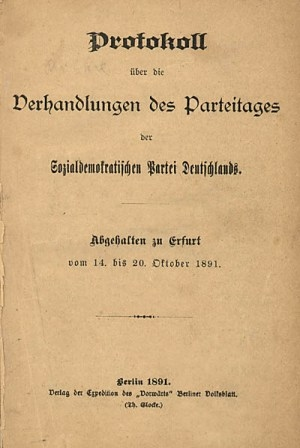
Cover of the Erfurt Program

The Representatives' Centralization's relationship to the SPD was ambivalent. The organization was allied with the SPD and supported the Erfurt Program. At the same time, the party mostly opposed the founding of the Representatives' Centralization and called upon its members to rejoin the centralized trade unions. The FVdG remained affiliated with the SPD, which in turn tolerated it because the SPD was afraid a split would lead to a large loss of members. The FVdG stated it would rejoin the centralized trade unions like the SPD leadership desired only if the centralized unions accepted the FVdG's organizational principles.

== Early years ==
The early years of the Representatives' Centralization of Germany were dominated by a discussion on how to finance strikes by individual local trade unions. The issue was how local unions could retain their autonomy when receiving financial assistance. Originally, all support between local organizations had been voluntary. But this system became more and more impractical, especially after the turn of the 20th century saw numerous large strikes in which employers reacted more aggressively — often by locking out workers. In 1899, the Business Committee felt it had to support a strike in Braunschweig. It took out a loan, which was paid off with dues income and from donations by Berlin unions. The following year, the Business Committee incurred 8,000 Marks in debt by supporting strikes. Part of the debt was paid off by the SPD, while the rest was apportioned among the local unions.

This practice was replaced in 1900 by a far more complex system of assessments and donations designed to raise the money to support strikes. This system was replaced in 1901 because it was impractical. The 1901 system required every local union and the central committee to create strike funds. Local unions would receive support for strikes from Berlin under certain circumstances, and the central Business Committee's fund would be replenished by all member organizations in amounts proportional to their membership and the average wage of their members. This system, too, proved problematic because it penalized the larger, wealthier unions — especially the construction workers in Berlin who had higher wages but also higher costs of living. From 1901 to 1903, many small organizations joined the federation, yet the FVdG's membership fell as the punitive strike support system drove some larger unions out. In 1903, the federation not only changed its name to the Free Association of German Trade Unions but also decided to return to the old system of voluntary contributions. This system remained in place until 1914. The Business Committee worked to ensure that unions contributed as much as they could. Often the committee resorted to threatening unions with expulsion in order to raise funds for a strike. Fritz Kater called this a dictatorship necessary for the movement, but local organizations still had far more autonomy than their counterparts in other German labor federations.

== Radicalization and expulsion from the SPD ==
During the first decade of the 20th century, the FVdG was transformed from a localist union federation into a syndicalist labor organization with anarchist tendencies. The process was initiated by the death of Gustav Keßler, the most important ideologue in the FVdG, in 1903. His role was largely assumed by the physician Raphael Friedeberg.

In 1903, a dispute between the FVdG and the Free Trade Unions in Berlin led the party commission to intervene and to sponsor talks aimed at re-unification of the two wings of the German labor movement. At the meeting, the FVdG made a number of compromises, which led to member protests. Soon, over one-third of the members left the union. The 1903 FVdG congress elected a panel to continue negotiations with the Free Trade Unions. This panel demanded that the Free Trade Unions adopt localist organizational principles as a prerequisite for re-unification. The FVdG panel realized this demand was unrealistic, but hoped the expulsion of revisionists from the SPD during the debate on Eduard Bernstein's theses would strengthen their position. The impossibility of a reconciliation between the two became obvious by March 1904, since the re-unification envisioned by both the leadership of the SPD and the Free Trade Unions was more along the lines of an integration of the FVdG into the Free Trade Unions.

The FVdG's disillusionment with the social democratic movement deepened during the mass strike debate. The role of the general strike for the socialist movement was first discussed within the FVdG in 1901. At the SPD's 1903 congress in Dresden, Raphael Friedeberg proposed discussing the topic, but his proposal was rejected by the congress. The following year, a proposal by Wilhelm Liebknecht and Eduard Bernstein to initiate debate on the topic was accepted, since they had distanced themselves from Friedeberg's positions.

Liebknecht and Bernstein, like the left wing of the party, felt the general strike should not be used to provoke the state but rather to defend political rights (especially the right to vote) should the state seek to abolish them. The more conservative faction in the party was opposed to this concept. In 1904, Friedeberg, speaking for the FVdG, advanced the view that the general strike must be a weapon in the hands of the proletariat and would be the last step before the socialist revolution. In 1905, his speech on the topic was even more radical. He claimed that historical materialism, a pillar of Marxism, was to blame for social democracy's alleged powerlessness, and introduced the alternative concept of historical psychism—which held that human psychology was more significant for social development than material conditions. He also recommended the anarchist literature especially Kropotkin's writings rather than Marx's works, which were most influential in the SPD.

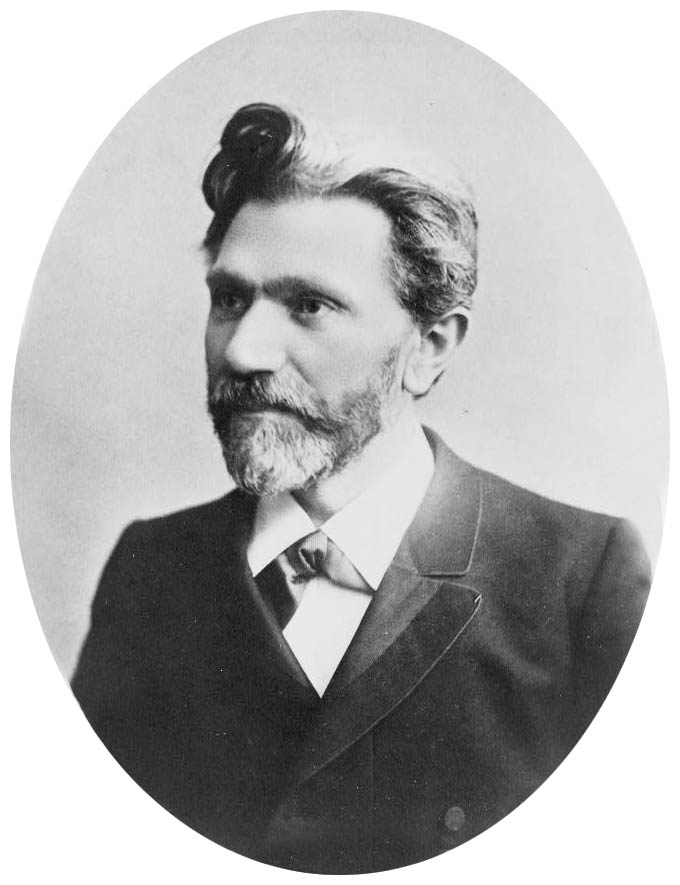
August Bebel, proposed the resolution to expel FVdG members from the SPD

The position that the general strike could be used, but only as a last resort, became dominant in the party during the mass strike debate. This caused much concern among the conservatives in the party, especially among many trade unionists. At a meeting in February 1906, the trade unionists were placated by party leaders, who said they would attempt to prevent a general strike at all costs. The FVdG reacted by publishing the secret protocols from the meeting in Die Einigkeit, greatly angering the party leadership.

At the 1905 party convention, August Bebel, who had always favored a stronger role for the SPD-affiliated unions, proposed a resolution requiring all members of the party to join the centralized trade unions for their respective professions. This would have forced all FVdG members to either leave the party or the trade union. The resolution was adopted, and implemented in 1907. An FVdG survey returned a vote of twenty-two to eight opposing rejoining the centralized unions. This led some of the masons, carpenters, and construction workers in the union to leave the FVdG in 1907 to avoid being expelled from the SPD, saying the organization was "taking a path, which would certainly lead to strife with the SPD and to syndicalism and anarchism." In 1908, the SPD's Nuremberg congress finally voted to make SPD and FVdG membership incompatible.

In addition to causing about two-thirds of its members to quit between 1906 and 1910, the radicalization of the FVdG also correlates to a slight change in the milieu, industries, and regions from which the organization drew its members. Many metal and construction workers, who had a localist tradition, left as a result of the syndicalist and anarchist tendencies in the FVdG. Miners, who worked mostly in the Ruhr area, did not have this tradition but developed a certain skepticism of bureaucratic structures. About 450 of them joined the FVdG before World War I, a sign of what was to come after the war.

== Pre-war period ==
Following the split from the SPD, the FVdG was increasingly influenced by French syndicalism and anarchism. In 1908, Kater called the Charter of Amiens, the platform of the French General Confederation of Labor (CGT), the earliest and largest syndicalist union worldwide, "a new revelation". Although there was no contact between German "intellectual anarchists" (like Gustav Landauer and Erich Mühsam) and the FVdG, it did have influential anarchist members, most notably Andreas Kleinlein and Fritz Köster. Kleinlein and Köster increasingly influenced the federation from 1908 on, and this led to the founding of Der Pionier in 1911. This newspaper, which was edited by Köster, had a much more aggressive tone than Die Einigkeit. Despite these developments, the influence of the anarchists in the pre-World War I FVdG remained quantitatively minute, especially as leading members like Kater were at the time very skeptical of the anarchist ideology.

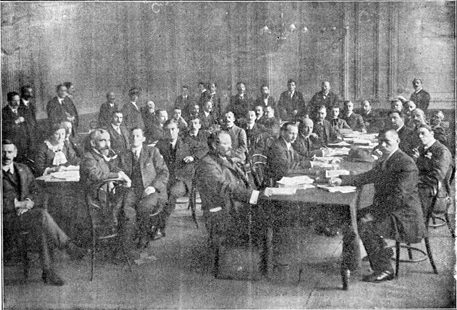
A session of the First International Syndicalist Congress

After both the British Industrial Syndicalist Education League (ISEL), a short-lived syndicalist organization heavily involved in the strike wave in Britain from 1910, and the Dutch syndicalist union National Labor Secretariat (NAS) published proposals for an international syndicalist congress in 1913, the FVdG was the first to express support. There were difficulties in organizing the congress, and the largest syndicalist union worldwide — the CGT — refused to participate because it was already affiliated with the social democratic International Federation of Trade Unions. Despite these challenges, the First International Syndicalist Congress took place at Holborn Town Hall in London from September 27 to October 2. British, Swedish, Danish, Dutch, Belgian, French, Spanish, Italian, Cuban, Brazilian, and Argentine organizations—both labor unions and political groups — had delegates in London in addition to the FVdG, which was represented by Karl Roche, Carl Windhoff, and Fritz Kater. There were also links with Norwegian, Polish, and American groups. Kater was elected co-president of the congress alongside Jack Wills. After Wills was forced to resign, Kater served as co-president with Jack Tanner. The congress had difficulty agreeing on many issues, the main source of conflict being whether further schisms in the European labor movement (as had occurred in Germany and the Netherlands) should be risked. The FVdG generally agreed with their Dutch comrades in calling on other unions to decide between syndicalism and socialism, while their Italian, French, and Spanish counterparts, most notably Alceste De Ambris of the Italian USI, were more intent on preventing further division. Accordingly, the congress was divided on the question of whether its purpose was to simply pave the way for deeper relations between the syndicalist unions or whether a Syndicalist International was to be founded. The opponents of a new organization prevailed, but the congress agreed to establish an Information Bureau. The Information Bureau was based in Amsterdam and published the Bulletin international du mouvement syndicaliste. The congress was considered a success by most who attended, with the notable exception of De Ambris. A second congress was scheduled to take place in two years' time in Amsterdam. Due to the outbreak of World War I, the congress did not take place. The Bulletin only published for eighteen issues before the war caused it to cease publication.

== World War I ==
During the buildup to World War I, the FVdG denounced the SPD's anti-war rhetoric as "complete humbug". With the start of war, the SPD and the mainstream labor movement entered into the Burgfrieden (or civil truce) with the German state. Under this agreement, the unions' structures remained intact and the government did not cut wages during the war. For their part, the unions did not support new strikes, ended current ones, and mobilized support for the war effort. The 1916 Auxiliary War Service Law established further cooperation between employers, unions, and the state by creating workers' committees in the factories and joint management-union arbitration courts.

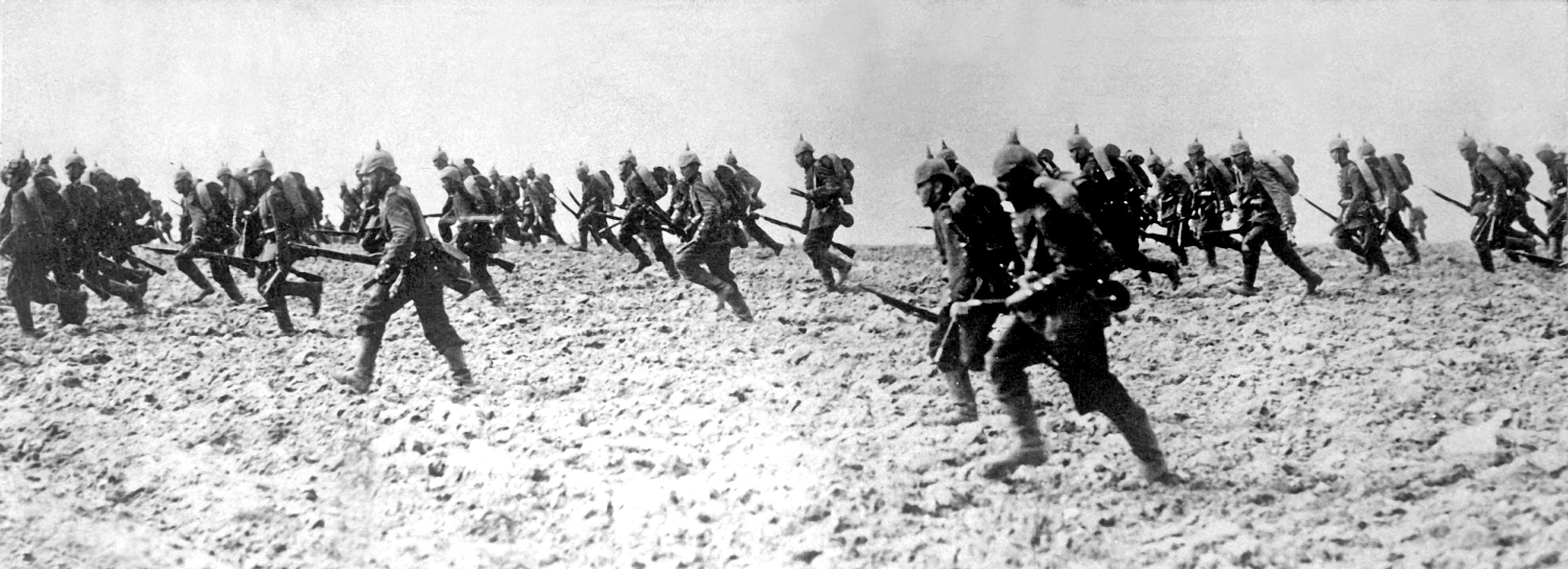
German infantry in 1914; the FVdG was the only German trade union not to support the German effort in World War I.

The FVdG, on the other hand, was the only labor organization in the country which refused to participate in the Burgfrieden. The union held that war-time patriotism was incompatible with proletarian internationalism and that war could only bring greater exploitation of labor. (Indeed, the average real wage fell by 55 percent during the war.) While the mainstream labor movement was quick to agree with the state that Russia and the United Kingdom were to blame for igniting the war, the FVdG held that the cause for the war was imperialism and that no blame could be assigned until after the conflict ended. The federation strongly criticized hostility towards foreigners working in Germany, especially Poles and Italians. It also rejected the concepts of the "nation" and national identity invoked in support of the war, claiming that common language, origin and culture (the foundations of a nation) did not exist in Germany. The FVdG's newspapers also declared that the war refuted historical materialism, since the masses had gone to war against their own material interests.

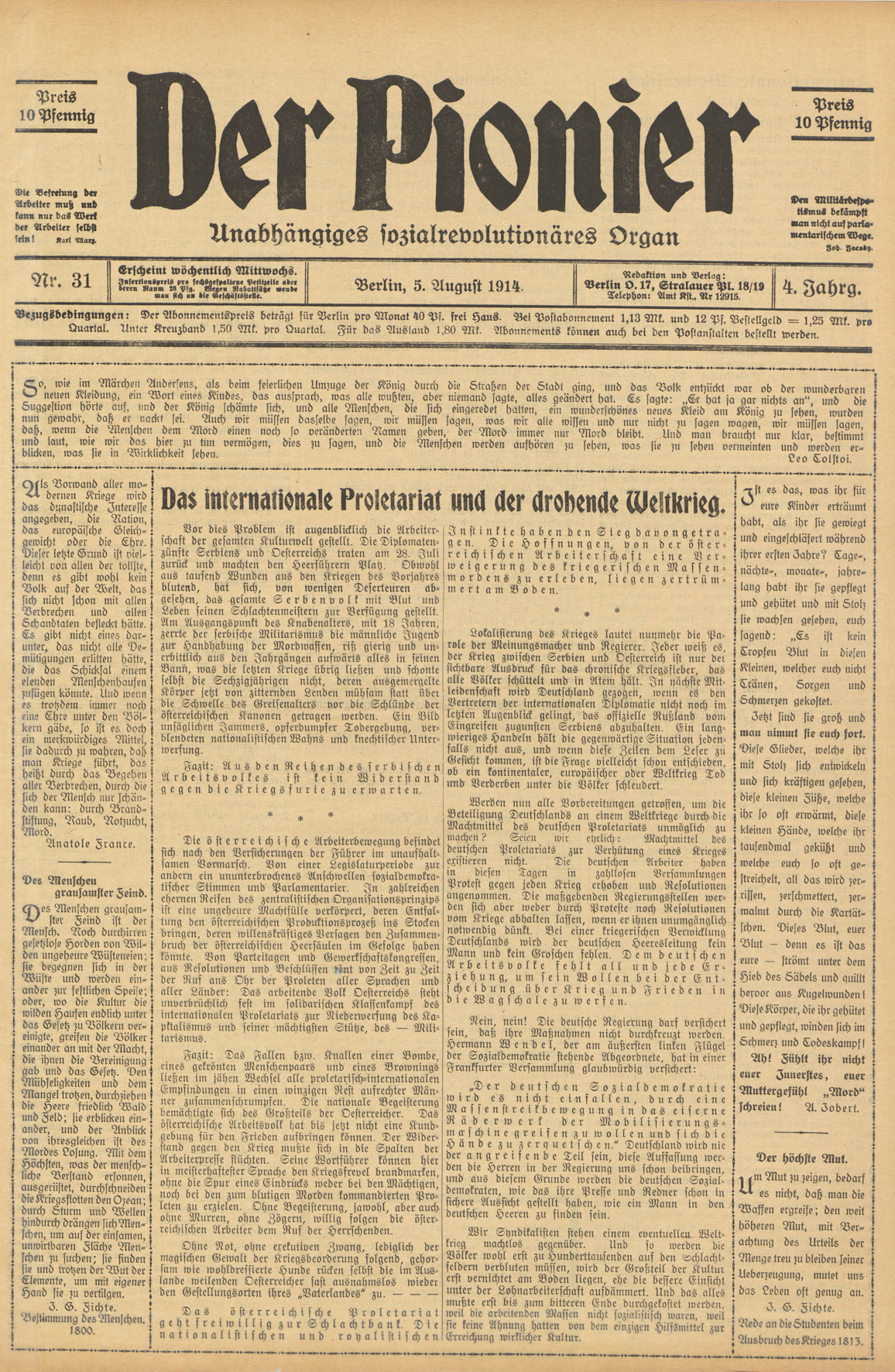
The last issue of Der Pionier

After Fritz Kater and Max Winkler reaffirmed syndicalist antimilitarism in the August 5, 1914 Der Pionier edition, the newspaper was banned. Three days later, Die Einigkeit criticized the SPD's stance on the war. It was then suppressed as well. The FVdG promptly responded by founding the weekly Mitteilungsblatt. After it was banned in June 1915, the federation founded the bi-weekly Rundschreiben, which survived until May 1917. Social Democratic publications on the other hand were allowed by Prussian War Minister Erich von Falkenhayn to be distributed even in the army. In the first days of the war, about 30 FVdG activists in Cologne, Elberfeld, Düsseldorf, Krefeld and other cities were arrested—some remaining under house arrest for two years. The government repression against the FVdG was heavy. While bans were often placed on the union's regular meetings, authorities in Düsseldorf even banned meetings of the syndicalist choir. Another problem for the union was that many of its members were conscripted. Half of the Berlin construction workers, the federation's largest union, were forced to serve in the army. In some places, all FVdG members were called into service.

Although the FVdG insisted that the "goal is everything and ... must be everything" (a play on Bernstein's formula that "the final goal, whatever it may be, is nothing to me: the movement is everything"), it was unable to do much more than keep its own structures alive during World War I. Immediately after the declaration of war, FVdG tried to continue its antiwar demonstrations to no avail. Although it constantly criticized the Burgfrieden and militarism in general, industrial action was not possible except for a few minor cases (most notably resistance by the carpenters' union to Sunday work). The FVdG also received support from abroad. The faction in the Italian USI led by Armando Borghi, an antimilitarist minority in the French CGT, the Dutch NAS, as well as Spanish, Swedish, and Danish syndicalists were all united with the FVdG in their opposition to the war.

As the Great War progressed, war exhaustion in Germany grew. The first strikes in the country since the start of the war broke out in 1915, steadily increasing in frequency and magnitude. The unions' role as troubleshooter between the employers and the workers soon led to conflict between the membership and union officials, and the Free Trade Unions steadily lost members. Correspondingly, the Reichstag faction of the SPD split over continued support for the war. The 1917 February Revolution in Russia was seen by the FVdG as an expression of the people's desire for peace. The syndicalists paid special attention to the role the general strike (which they had been advocating for years) played in the revolution. They were unable to comment on the October Revolution as the Rundschreiben had been banned by the time it broke out.

== November Revolution and re-founding as FAUD ==
Some claim that the FVdG influenced strikes in the arms industry as early as February or March 1918, but the organization was not re-established on a national level until December 1918. On December 14, Fritz Kater started publishing Der Syndikalist (The Syndicalist) in Berlin as a replacement for Die Einigkeit. On December 26 and 27, a conference organized by Kater and attended by 33 delegates from 43 local unions took place in Berlin. The delegates reflected upon the difficult times during the war and proudly noted that the FVdG was the only trade union which did not have to adjust its program to the new political conditions because it had remained loyal to its anti-state and internationalist principles. The delegates reaffirmed their rejection of parliamentarianism and refused to participate in the National Assembly.

In Spring 1919, Karl Roche wrote a new platform for the FVdG entitled "Was wollen die Syndikalisten? Programm, Ziele und Wege der 'Freien Vereinigung deutscher Gewerkschaften'" ("What Do the Syndicalists Want? The Program, Goals, and Means of the 'Free Association of German Trade Unions'"). In addition to reiterating pre-war ideas and slogans, it went further by criticizing participation in electoral democracy, claiming that this handicapped and confused proletarian class struggle. The platform also called for the establishment of the dictatorship of the proletariat, a position which was designed to reach out to the newly formed Communist Party (KPD) and International Communists of Germany. In late 1918 and early 1919, the FVdG became an important player in the strike movement in the Ruhr region (which mostly involved miners). Its organizers, most notably Carl Windhoff, became regular speakers at workers' demonstrations. On April 1, a general strike supported by the FVdG, the KPD and the Independent Social Democratic Party (USPD) began. The strike eventually involved up to 75 percent of the region's miners until it was violently suppressed in late April by the SPD-led government. After the strike and the ensuing collapse of the General Miners' Union, the FVdG expanded its unions rapidly and independently of the aforementioned political parties, especially in the Ruhr region. This led to a massive expansion in FVdG membership. The FVdG's criticism of the bureaucratic centralized trade unions, its advocation of direct action, and its low membership dues were received well by the workers in the Ruhr region. By August 1919, the federation had around 60,000 members throughout Germany. However, its Ruhr miners' unions left the craft unionist scheme the FVdG had traditionally been organized by behind, preferring simpler industrial structures.

The end of cooperation between the FVdG and the political parties in the Ruhr region was part of a nationwide trend after Paul Levi, an anti-syndicalist, became chairman of the KPD in March. Moreover, Rudolf Rocker, a communist anarchist and follower of Kropotkin, joined the FVdG in March 1919. He returned via The Netherlands in November 1918 after living in exile in London, where he had been active in the Jewish anarchist scene. Augustin Souchy, more of a Landauer-esque anarchist, also joined the federation in 1919. Both rapidly gained influence in the organization and—as anti-Marxists—were opposed to close collaboration with communists.

Nevertheless, the FVdG's Rhineland and Westphalia section merged with left communist unions to form the Free Workers' Union (FAU) in September 1919. Syndicalists from the FVdG were the biggest and most dominant faction in the FAU. The FAU's statutes mostly reflected compromises by the federation's member unions, but also reflected the FVdG's significant influence.

Soon it was decided to complete the merger in Rhineland and Westphalia on a national level. The FVdG's 12th congress, held December 27 to 30, became the Free Workers' Union of Germany's (FAUD) founding congress. Most left communists (including the influential veteran member Karl Roche) had already quit or were in the process of leaving the FAU in Rhineland and Westphalia by this point. The majority of them would join the General Workers' Union of Germany (AAUD), which was founded in February 1920. Without the left communists to oppose its adoption, Rocker's thoroughly anarchist "Prinzipienerklärung des Syndikalismus" ("Declaration of Syndicalist Principles"), which the Business Commission had charged him with drafting, became the FAUD's platform without much controversy. The FAUD also rejected the dictatorship of the proletariat and other Marxist terms and ideas. According to the Business Commission, the congress was attended by 109 delegates representing 111,675 workers, twice as many as were claimed just four and a half months earlier.

== Bibliography ==
- Bock, Hans-Manfred (1993) [1969]. Syndikalismus und Linkskommunismus von 1918 bis 1923: Ein Beitrag zur Sozial- und Ideengeschichte der frühen Weimarer Republik (in German). Darmstadt: Wissenschaftliche Buchgesellschaft. ISBN 3-534-12005-1.
- Bock, Hans-Manfred (1989). "Anarchosyndikalismus in Deutschland. Eine Zwischenbilanz". Internationale wissenschaftliche Korrespondenz zur Geschichte der deutschen Arbeiterbewegung (in German). 25: 293–358. ISSN 0046-8428.
- Bock, Hans Manfred (1990). "Anarchosyndicalism in the German Labour Movement: a Rediscovered Minority Tradition". In van der Linden, Marcel; Thorpe, Wayne (eds.). Revolutionary Syndicalism: an International Perspective. Aldershot: Scolar Press. pp. 59–79. ISBN 0-85967-815-6.
- Fricke, Dieter (1976). Die deutsche Arbeiterbewegung 1869-1914: Ein Handbuch über ihre Organisation und Tätigkeit im Klassenkampf (in German). Berlin: Dietz Verlag.
- Müller, Dirk H. (1985a). Gewerkschaftliche Versammlungsdemokratie und Arbeiterdelegierte vor 1918: Ein Beitrag zur Geschichte des Lokalismus, des Syndikalismus und der entstehenden Rätebewegung (in German). Berlin: Colloqium Verlag. ISBN 3-7678-0650-9.
- Müller, Dirk H. (1985b). "Syndicalism and Localism in the German Trade Union Movement". In Mommsen, Wolfgang J.; Husung, Hans-Gerhard (eds.). The Development of Trade Unionism in Great Britain and Germany, 1880–1914. The German Historical Institute. London: George Allen & Unwin. pp. 239–249. ISBN 0-04-940080-0.
- Pierson, Stanley (1993). Marxist intellectuals and the working-class mentality in Germany, 1887–1912. Cambridge, MA: Harvard University Press. ISBN 0-674-55123-0.
- Rübner, Hartmut (1994). Freiheit und Brot: Die Freie Arbeiter-Union Deutschlands: Eine Studie zur Geschichte des Anarchosyndikalismus (in German). Berlin/Cologne: Libertad Verlag. ISBN 3-922226-21-3.
- Schönhoven, Klaus (1985). "Localism—Craft Union—Industrial Union: Organizational Patterns in German Trade Unionism". In Mommsen, Wolfgang J.; Husung, Hans-Gerhard (eds.). The Development of Trade Unionism in Great Britain and Germany, 1880-1914. The German Historical Institute. London: George Allen & Unwin. pp. 219–235. ISBN 0-04-940080-0.
- Schuster, Dieter (2000). "Chronologie der deutschen Gewerkschaftsbewegung von den Anfängen bis 1918" (in German).
- Thorpe, Wayne (June 2000). "Keeping the Faith: The German Syndicalists in the First World War". Central European History. 33 (2): 195–216. doi:10.1163/156916100746301. ISSN 0008-9389. S2CID 143836877.
- Thorpe, Wayne (March 2001). "The European Syndicalists and War, 1914–1918". Contemporary European History. 10 (1): 1–24. doi:10.1017/S0960777301001011. ISSN 0960-7773. S2CID 162858237.
- Vogel, Angela (1977). Der deutsche Anarcho-Syndikalismus: Genese und Theorie einer vergessenen Bewegung (in German). Berlin: Karin Kramer Verlag. ISBN 3-89756-070-6.
- Westergard-Thorpe, Wayne (1978). "Towards a Syndicalist International: The 1913 London Congress". International Review of Social History. 13: 33–78. doi:10.1017/S0020859000005691. ISSN 0020-8590.
