= Direkte Aktion =

German anarcho-syndicalist newspaper

- Type: Bimonthly newspaper
- Publisher: Direkte Aktion e.V.
- Founded: 1977
- Political alignment: anarcho-syndicalist
- Language: German
- Headquarters: None, officially according to Impressum: Frankfurt (Main)
- Website: www.direkteaktion.org

The Direkte Aktion (German for Direct Action, pronounced [diˈʁɛktə ʔakˈtsi̯oːn]) is a German bimonthly newspaper by the anarcho-syndicalist Free Workers' Union. It has existed since the union's formation in 1977.

In line with anarcho-syndicalist principles, the editors are elected by the national convention of the Free Workers' Union and can be recalled at any time. They do not receive any royalties for their work. Notably, the Direkte Aktion does not have a central office, instead it is created decentrally in the editors' flats and the union's establishments.

Since DA 170 (July/August 2005), a full online edition of the newspaper as well as a PDF version of the print issue are available. The PDF version, however, only covers the first page of the issue until the next one has been published.

== See also ==
- Direct action
