= Gustav Kessler =

Gustav Kessler (German spelling: Keßler; 1832–1904) was a German trade unionist.

In his early life he had been apprenticed as a carpenter before qualifying as a state registered architect (German: Regierungsbaumeister).

He became a social democrat after 1883 having previously been a supporter of the Progressive Liberal Party. He was the editor of Der Bauhandwerker, a construction workers' unionist journal from 1884 to 1886. In the aftermath of the Berlin bricklayers' strike of 1885, he and the strike's leader, Karl Behrend, with another bricklayer trade unionist, Fritz Wilke, were expelled from Berlin in June 1886 under the Anti-Socialist Law. He settled in Brunswick from where he edited Der Baugewerkschafter and Das Vereinsblatt before returning to Berlin in 1890. In 1889, he was a delegate at the Second International's founding congress in Paris. He was editor of the socialist newspaper Volksblatt für Teltow-Beeskow-Storkow-Charlottenburg after 1890. In 1890 and 1891, he was the SPD party delegate from Calbe-Aschersleben. He ran for the Reichstag repeatedly. An important figure in the localist current of the German labor movement, he was one of the leading founders of the Free Association of German Trade Unions in 1897 and the editor of its organ Einigkeit until his death in 1904.
