= Liebig 34 =

Former anarchist squat in Berlin

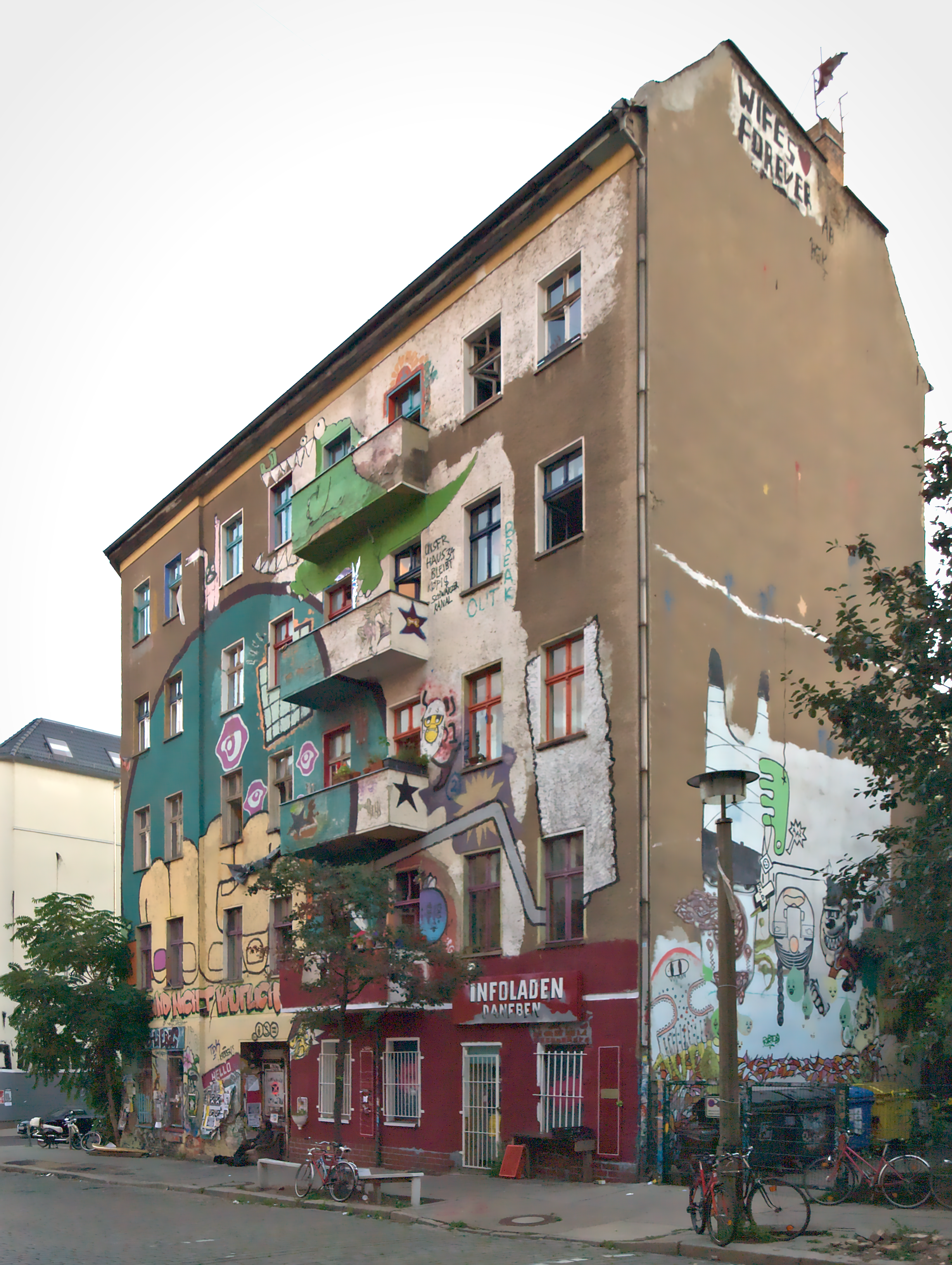
Liebig 34 in 2012 with the Daneben infoshop visible on the ground floor

Liebig 34 was an anarchist squat at Liebigstraße 34 in the Friedrichshain-Kreuzberg district of Berlin. It was occupied in 1990 and cleared by eviction in 2020. The squat hosted an anarcha-feminist housing co-operative, the L34-Bar and an infoshop called Daneben on the ground floor.

== History ==
Liebig 34 was squatted in 1990 during the Peaceful Revolution as part of a flood of occupations; Liebig 14 was also occupied (and evicted in 2011). From the beginning Liebig 34 was an explicitly feminist space to counter the patriarchal behaviour of some men in the activist counterculture. It was later legalized.

The squat became an anarcho-feminist housing co-operative, with an events space known as the L34-Bar and an infoshop called Daneben on the ground floor, which was set up following the Battle of Mainzer Straße in 1991. In 2015, the 35 residents described the co-operative as a "queer-anarcho-feminist collective".

== Eviction ==
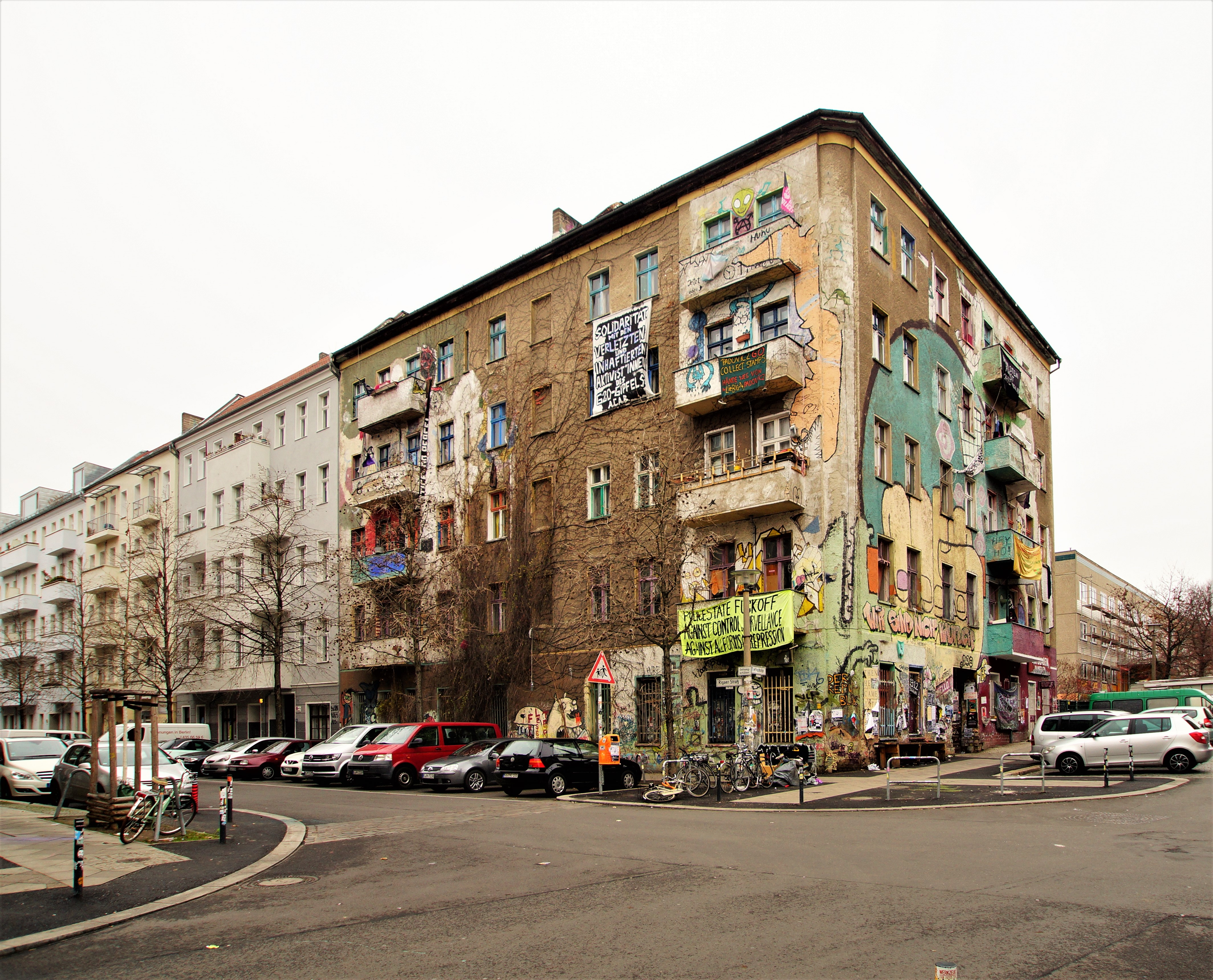
Liebig 34 in 2018

In 2018, a lease on the building expired and the owner refused to renew it. After two years of legal wrangling, the owner was able to request an eviction. The day of the eviction was 9 October 2020 and in 90 minutes, 57 people were escorted by police out of the building. The Berliner Morgenpost estimated that there were 1,500 police officers and around the same number of demonstrators. The police had previously occupied neighbouring roofs to prevent counter-attacks. The residents were carried out by ladder.

Two weeks after the eviction, a fire was started in the 50m³ of materials taken out from the building which nearly spread back into the former squat. Several masked people were seen throwing incendiary devices.
