= Free Workers' Union =

European anarcho-syndicalist union

FAU
- Free Workers' Union
- Freie Arbeiterinnen- und Arbeiter-Union
- Founded: 1977
- Location(s): Germany and Switzerland
- Members: 2.000 (2025)
- Affiliations: International Confederation of Labour
- Website: www.fau.org

The Free Workers' Union (German: Freie Arbeiterinnen- und Arbeiter-Union or Freie Arbeiter*innen-Union; abbreviated FAU) is an anarcho-syndicalist union in Germany and Switzerland.

== History ==
The FAU sees itself in the tradition of the Free Workers' Union of Germany (German: Freie Arbeiter Union Deutschlands; FAUD), the largest anarcho-syndicalist union in Germany until it disbanded as a formal organization in 1933 to avoid repression by the National Socialist regime which had come into power that year. The FAU was founded in 1977, and grew consistently through the 1990s. Now, the FAU consists of just under 40 groups, organized locally and by branch of trade. It rejects hierarchical organizations and political representation and believes in the concept of federalism; most decisions are made by the local unions. The purpose of the federalist organization is to coordinate strikes, campaigns and actions, and for communication. It has 3000 to 4000 members, organized in the various local unions.

The FAU publishes the anarcho-syndicalist online-newspaper Direkte Aktion and pamphlets on current and historical topics.

Because it supports the classical concept of the abolition of the wage system, the FAU was monitored until 2011 by the Bundesamt für Verfassungsschutz (Federal Office for the Protection of the Constitution).

The FAU was disaffiliated by the International Workers' Association in 2016, and became one of the founding members of the International Confederation of Labour (ICL) in 2018.

== Labor disputes ==
=== Delivery industry and gig economy ===
The FAU is now also used as a form of representation and organisation by workers in the gig economy, such as workers in online food delivery services. At the end of 2016, the FAU, together with a number of other unions, launched an international network of delivery workers. In Berlin, the FAU founded a special section called "Deliverunion" in mid-2017, in which drivers of the companies Deliveroo and Foodora, among others, organised themselves. Drivers of various services also subsequently organised themselves in other cities such as Leipzig, Dresden and Hamburg. In June 2017, FAU demonstrators unloaded scrap bicycles in front of Deliveroo's Berlin headquarters in this context to protest against the working conditions of the company's bike messengers. In Leipzig, FAU 2020 was in a prolonged dispute with the company Durstexpress. In 2021, the FAU Berlin supported a widely publicised wildcat strike by workers at the delivery service Gorillas with solidarity actions, FAU unions in Leipzig and Magdeburg were involved in various conflicts with Domino's Pizza. In 2022, the FAU Dresden announced that it was currently supporting members of the delivery service Flink in conflicts. The FAU repeatedly emphasises that migrants in particular are specifically recruited for companies in the sector and that dependencies, poor knowledge of the legal situation and language barriers are used there for the systematic violation of labour rights.

=== Further industrial action in migrant sectors ===
In 2014, members of the "Foreigner Section" of the FAU Berlin started an industrial action under the slogan "Mall of Shame" against contractors and subcontractors who were in charge of the Mall of Berlin construction project. Specifically, this involved a large group of Romanian construction workers who were allegedly not paid their wages for several months. Part of the struggle involved continuous rallies and demonstrations.

During the Corona crisis, in May 2020, Romanian migrant workers organised themselves into the FAU Bonn, working for the Spargel Ritter company in Bornheim. The migrant workers went on strike after they were refused payment of their contractually guaranteed wages. They also protested against the housing conditions and the poor food supply on the asparagus farm. The strike succeeded in getting a larger part of the wages paid. The case was received in the regional and national media as an example of the exploitation of Eastern European workers in Germany.

=== Food Service Industry ===
In the catering industry, FAU trade unions frequently engage in smaller individual disputes, often over labour law violations. According to their own statements, the unions try to help their members to get justice quickly and in this way shorten long-term court proceedings. For example, a major industrial dispute took place in 2014 in the pub "Trotzdem" in Dresden, where the staff went on strike for a total of four weeks, accompanied by rallies and demonstrations. The unions have also been involved in the strike in the restaurant sector.

== Ideology ==
In labour disputes, the FAU prefers to use direct action, by which it means using the most direct pressure possible, for example through public action or disruption of workplace procedures, to win disputes in the interests of workers.

The trade union federation rejects parliamentarism and representation of the people as fields of activity. According to its own representations, real political goals are not to be achieved via parliament, but directly through the involvement of the trade union members concerned. It has a tactical attitude towards works council elections. The principle of social partnership and exempt or paid functionaries are rejected.

Depending on the local union, anarcho-syndicalism is also accompanied by the theories and practice of autonomies and operaismo. With its activity, the FAU wants to prepare, besides a concrete improvement of living and working conditions, the social revolution with which the classless and undominated society is to be achieved by means of a general strike.

The FAU was listed by the Office for the Protection of the Constitution of Lower Saxony in the section on left-wing extremism in the 2013 report on the protection of the constitution. It was also mentioned in this section in the Bundesverfassungsschutzbericht 2019, after this had not been the case in previous years. When asked about the reason for observation by the MDR magazine "Exactly" in 2021 to several constitutional protection agencies, only the Saxony-Anhalt constitutional protection agency commented, giving the following reason: "At its core [... ] the FAU strives for a society without domination and property."

== Strike Bikes ==
After Lone Star Funds announced it would close a bicycle factory in Nordhausen, Thuringia, it had acquired, its workers decided to occupy the factory in July 2007. From 22 to 26 October the workers continued bicycle production. With the help of the FAU, over 1,800 of these red bicycles were sold under the label "Strike Bike". The occupation of the factory ended after the company's liquidator forced the workers out.

== Free Workers' Union Berlin ==
On 11 December 2009 the Berlin District Court issued an injunction on the Free Workers' Union Berlin (FAU-B) banning it from calling itself a union or grassroots union. The court decision was confirmed on 5 January 2010. The FAU views this as "the culmination of a series of attempts by the Neue Babylon Berlin GmbH to legally hogtie the strongest and most active form of workers' representation in the company. This attack on the basic right of freedom of association is a de facto ban of the union in Berlin". On 10 June 2010 the Kammergericht overturned the injunction.

== Free Workers' Union in Switzerland ==
In Switzerland, the FAU is represented by independent local syndicates in Bern, Lucerne, Solothurn and, since 2023, St.Gallen. Since 2010, the "Schwarzi Chatz" (Swiss-German, German: Schwarze Katze, English: Black Cat) has been published, which also serves as a mouthpiece for the FAU syndicates organized in Switzerland. Since 2022, there has been a separate youth organization, the "Freie Arbeiter*innen Jugend" (FAJ for short).
