= Augustin Souchy =

Silesian anarchist journalist (1892–1984)

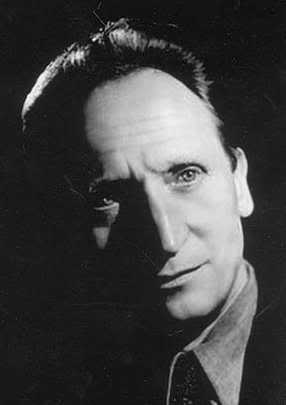
- Augustin Souchy
- Born: Augustin Souchy Bauer; 28 August 1892; Ratibor, German Empire
- Died: 1 January 1984 (aged 91); Munich, West Germany
- Occupation: Educational advisor to the ILO
- Era: 20th century
- Notable work: Die tragische Woche im Mai 1937

Augustin Souchy Bauer (28 August 1892 – 1 January 1984) was a Silesian anarchist, antimilitarist, labour union official and journalist. He traveled widely and wrote extensively about the Spanish Civil War and intentional communities. He was born in Ratibor, in what was then the German Empire.

== Biography ==
In 1915, during World War I, he emigrated to Sweden to avoid military service, being exiled by the Swedish government two years later for anti-militaristic propaganda. From then on, he traveled throughout the world returning to Germany once and living in Spain, South America and France at different times. He was very active in the anarchist movement wherever he lived and worked together with many famous anarchists such as Peter Kropotkin and Rudolf Rocker.

Described as the most prominent Silesian to have fought in the Spanish Civil War, he participated in Confederación Nacional del Trabajo and in the Spanish Revolution during the conflict. His work "The Tragic Week in May" is one of the few first hand sources that exist on the May Days of 1937 in Barcelona. After the war he was arrested in France but managed to escape to Mexico.

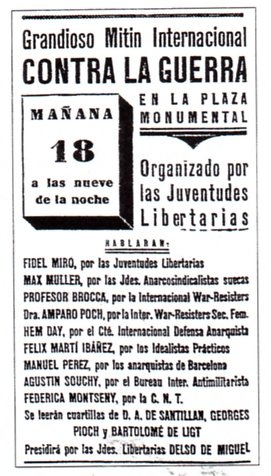
Poster advertising a rally in La Monumental, listing "Agustin Souchy" as a speaker

He spent the rest of his life working together with syndicalist and anarchist organizations and remained active as a journalist. He died in Munich on 1 January 1984.

== Bibliography ==
These are Souchy's works that have been translated into English:

- Mühsam, Erich: His life, his work, his martyrdom, 1934
- The Tragic Week in May, CNT-FAI, 1937 (account of sectarian violence in Spain during the Spanish Revolution)
- Collectivizations: The constructive achievements of the Spanish Revolution, 1937
- With the Peasants of Aragon, Cienfuegos Press, 1982 (Souchy's account of Spanish peasant cooperatives)
- Beware! Anarchist!, Charles H. Kerr, Chicago, 1992 (Souchy's autobiography)

For a more complete listing, see the German Wikipedia article at Augustin Souchy.

== See also ==
- Anarchism in Germany
