= Fritz Kater =

German trade unionist and publisher

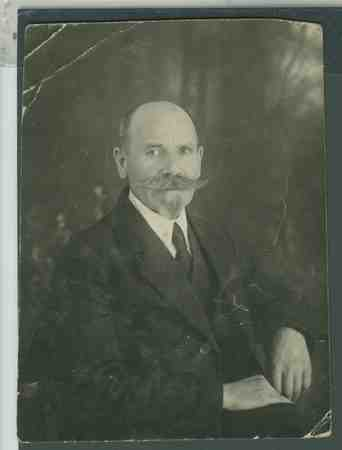
- Born: 19 December 1861; Barleben
- Died: 20 May 1945 (aged 83); Berlin
- Occupation: trade unionist

Fritz Kater (1861–1945) was a German trade unionist, publisher, and anarcho-syndicalist. He served as the organisational leader of Germany's anarcho-syndicalist labour movement from 1897 to 1930. Kater was active in the Free Association of German Trade Unions (FVdG) and its successor organization, the Free Workers' Union of Germany. He edited the FVdG's periodical Einigkeit and after World War I owned the publishing houses Fritz Kater Verlag and Syndikalist.

== Biography ==
Born in Barleben near Magdeburg as the son of an agricultural labourer, Kater contributed to the family income from childhood, working in a sugar factory, as an ox driver and as a domestic slaughterer before training as a bricklayer. He joined the bricklayers' trade association in Magdeburg in 1883, entered the Social Democratic Party in 1887, and served two prison terms in 1890 and 1891 for holding an unauthorised assembly and for a speech deemed seditious.

After moving to Berlin in 1892 he sided with the decentralist "localists" in the disputes over union structure, and in 1904 he succeeded Gustav Keßler as chairman of the business commission of the Free Association of German Trade Unions, a post he held until 1930. In 1907 he declined both a paid position in the centralised unions and a seat in the Reichstag, leaving the Social Democratic Party the following year. Initially hostile to anarchism, he was drawn to French syndicalism and became one of the leading figures of German anarcho-syndicalism, attending the first International Syndicalist Congress in London in 1913, helping to keep the syndicalist organisation intact through the First World War, and co-founding the Free Workers' Union of Germany in 1919, which he later represented at congresses of the International Workers' Association.

Alongside his union work he published the FVdG weekly Die Einigkeit and, after the war, ran the Fritz Kater Verlag and the Verlag Syndikalist, which issued more than a hundred anarchist and syndicalist titles. He retired from his office in 1930 at the age of seventy and died in Berlin on 20 May 1945 while defusing an unexploded bomb.

== See also ==
- Anarchism in Germany
