= Free Workers' Union of Germany =

German anarcho-syndicalist trade union

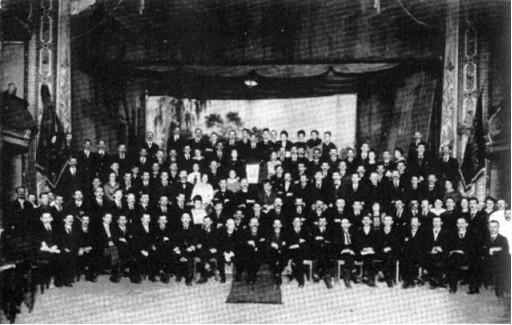
Delegates at the 1922 FAUD congress in Erfurt

The Free Workers' Union of Germany (German: Freie Arbeiter Union Deutschlands; FAUD) was an anarcho-syndicalist trade union in Germany. It stemmed from the Free Association of German Trade Unions (FDVG) which combined with the Ruhr region's Freie Arbeiter Union on September 15, 1919.

The FAUD was involved in the revolution in Germany from 1918 to 1923, and continued to be involved in the German labor movement after the FAUD began to decline in 1923. After 1921, the FAUD added an "AS" to their name, signifying a full transition from simple syndicalism to anarcho-syndicalism. This also led to further difficulties between the intellectual elites of the FAUD (AS), such as Rudolf Rocker, and the rank and file workers, mostly in the Ruhr region, who were more worried about "bread and butter" issues than anarchist political activities. These workers, the majority of the FAUD-(AS) members, formed the Gelsenkircherichtung (Gelsenkirche tendency) within the movement, and given the movements federalist structure, began to drift away from the FAUD-(AS) intellectually and organizationally. Eventually, those workers who had joined during the revolution left the movement and the remaining FAUD-(AS) members came from the FDVG's original constituencies of the building trades and specialized textile workers.

At its peak, the FAUD had 150,000 members.

== Suppression and legacy ==
Following the Nazis rise to power, in 1933 the Nazi regime suppressed the FAUD.

In spite of the FAUD's dismantlement, many people who had been members took up organized resistance against Nazism and fascism, particularly within the Ruhr region of Germany. Additionally, former FAUD members were also involved in smuggling texts into Nazi Germany from the Netherlands, and were involved in smuggling anti-authoritarian activists into the Netherlands. Former FAUD members who fled to Spain took part in the Spanish Civil War alongside their allies in the Confederación Nacional del Trabajo. (see: Gruppe DAS and the revolution in Spain, 1936–1939).

The primary organ of the FAUD was the newspaper Der Syndikalist, which was first published in December 1918, and continued until the group's suppression by the Nazis.

The International Workers' Association (IWA) of which the FAUD was a member, was founded upon the initiative of the German organization in 1922. The anarcho-syndicalist Free Workers' Union (FAU) founded in 1977 considers itself a successor of the FAUD. The FAU was a member of the IWA until 2016.

== Members ==
- Hermann Böse
- Minna Faßhauer
- Etta Federn
- Fritz Kater
- Helmut Kirschey
- Fritz Köster
- August Merges
- Erich Mühsam
- Max Nettlau
- Rudolf Rocker
- Helmut Rüdiger
- Alexander Schapiro
- Augustin Souchy
- Milly Witkop

== See also ==
- List of trade unions
- Union of Manual and Intellectual Workers

== Bibliography ==
- Bock, Hans Manfred (1990). "Anarchosyndicalism in the German Labour Movement: a Rediscovered Minority Tradition". In van der Linden, Marcel; Thorpe, Wayne (eds.). Revolutionary Syndicalism: an International Perspective. Aldershot: Scolar Press. pp. 59–79. ISBN 0-85967-815-6.
- Jenko, Jürgen (2012-07-27). "Miners and the Rise of Anarcho-Syndicalism in the Ruhr" (PDF). European Mining History, 19th and 20th centuries. Bochum.
- Müller, Dirk H. (1985b). "Syndicalism and Localism in the German Trade Union Movement". In Mommsen, Wolfgang J.; Husung, Hans-Gerhard (eds.). The Development of Trade Unionism in Great Britain and Germany, 1880-1914. The German Historical Institute. London: George Allen & Unwin. pp. 239–249. ISBN 0-04-940080-0.
- Schönhoven, Klaus (1985). "Localism—Craft Union—Industrial Union: Organizational Patterns in German Trade Unionism". In Mommsen, Wolfgang J.; Husung, Hans-Gerhard (eds.). The Development of Trade Unionism in Great Britain and Germany, 1880-1914. The German Historical Institute. London: George Allen & Unwin. pp. 219–235. ISBN 0-04-940080-0.
- Thorpe, Wayne (June 2000). "Keeping the Faith: The German Syndicalists in the First World War". Central European History. 33 (2): 195–216. doi:10.1163/156916100746301. ISSN 0008-9389. S2CID 143836877.
- Thorpe, Wayne (March 2001). "The European Syndicalists and War, 1914-1918". Contemporary European History. 10 (1): 1–24. doi:10.1017/S0960777301001011. ISSN 0960-7773. S2CID 162858237.
