= George Swasey =

George R. Swasey (also spelt Swazey) was a syndicalist organiser notable for establishing the Industrial Workers of the World (IWW) in Great Britain.

Swasey was sent to Great Britain in 1913 and the British section of the IWW was founded on 20 February 1913. He attended the First International Syndicalist Congress, held in London, 27 September to 2 October, 1913, but not as delegate of the IWW.
