= List of syndicalists =

This is a list of notable syndicalists, grouped by nationality.

== American syndicalists ==
- Albert Parsons
- Bill Haywood
- Daniel De Leon
- Noam Chomsky
- Sam Dolgoff
- Helen Keller

== French syndicalists ==
- Fernand Pelloutier leader of the French Bourses du Travail (Labour Exchange)
- Émile Pouget Co-leader of the Confédération Générale du Travail (CGT, founded in 1895)
- Hubert Lagardelle writer
- Georges Sorel
- Albert Camus

== English syndicalists ==
- Tom Mann
- David Douglass NUM Leader
- Jack Tanner
- Tony Benn

== Scottish syndicalists ==
- John Maclean, political activist and writer

== Welsh syndicalists ==
- Noah Ablett, Trade union leader, and wrote the syndicalist pamphlet The Miners' Next Step
- Sam Mainwaring, orator and originator of the term 'anarcho-syndicalist'
- A. J. Cook

== Irish syndicalists ==
- Jim Larkin
- James Connolly

== German syndicalists ==
- Rudolf Rocker

== Italian syndicalists ==
- Alceste De Ambris
- Michele Bianchi
- Arturo Labriola
- Agostino Lanzillo
- Angelo Oliviero Olivetti
- Paolo Orano
- Sergio Panunzio

== New Zealander syndicalists ==
- Jock Barnes
- Simon Oosterman

== Spanish syndicalists ==
- Pablo Iglesias
- Francisco Ascaso
- Buenaventura Durruti
- Ángel Pestaña
- Ramiro Ledesma Ramos
- Onésimo Redondo
- Jose Antonio Primo de Rivera

== Swedish syndicalists ==
- Björn Söderberg
- Britta Gröndahl
- Elise Ottesen-Jensen
- Eva X Moberg
- Folke Fridell
- Harry Järv
- Ivar Lo-Johansson
- Mattias Gardell
- Moa Martinson
- Stig Dagerman

== See also ==
- Anarchism
- Anarcho-syndicalism
- Consensus decision-making
- Council communism
- Deleonism
- Democratic socialism
- Eco-syndicalism
- Fascist syndicalism
- International Anarchist Congress of Amsterdam (1907)
- IWA–AIT
- National syndicalism
- Libertarian socialism
- National Confederation of Labor
- Soviet (council)
- Worker co-operative
