= Industrial Syndicalist Education League =

- Abbreviation: ISEL
- Leader: Tom Mann
- Founded: November 1910
- Dissolved: November 1913
- Split from: Social Democratic Federation
- Newspaper: The Syndicalist
- Membership (1912): 100,000
- Ideology: Syndicalism
- Political position: Far-left

The Industrial Syndicalist Education League (ISEL) was a British syndicalist organisation which existed from 1910 to 1913.

== History ==
In May 1910 Guy Bowman and Tom Mann, two dissident members of the Social Democratic Federation (SDF) travelled to France visiting members of the syndicalist General Confederation of Labour. Mann returned convinced of their doctrine. He started the monthly newspaper The Industrial Syndicalist in July. He went on to establish contacts with leading syndicalists in the United Kingdom like Peter Larkin and James Larkin, and other dissidents in the Independent Labour Party, the SDF, and the Clarion movement.

In November 1910 the ISEL was founded at two-day conference in Manchester, attended by 200 delegates claiming to represent 60,000 workers. The ISEL became the first British fully syndicalist organisation, and the largest ever. It was not a trade union, but rather sought to disseminate syndicalist ideas within the labour movement. The ISEL did not have a formal organisational structure or membership. It did not consider the conditions to be ripe to start a mass organisation, thus it consisted mainly of Mann and a few of his confidants. It gained the support of E. J. B. Allen, associated with the Industrialist League. Beginning in January 1912 it published a monthly newspaper, The Syndicalist, which claimed a circulation of 20,000.

The period from 1910 to 1914 was marked by labour unrest including the 1911 Liverpool general transport strike and the Dublin lock-out. Tom Mann was the head of the strike committee of the former, which did not allow any transportation in the city without its permission. The ISEL also had close contact to coal miners in South Wales.

In November 1912, the ISEL held a two conferences attended by 235 delegates claiming to represent 100,000 workers. That winter, the organisation began setting up branches and drawing up a constitution.

In September 1913, the ISEL hosted the First International Syndicalist Congress at Holborn Town Hall in London, where syndicalists from all over Europe and South America convened. The same year also saw the ISEL collapse. The period of unrest that had been significant for the development of British syndicalism was coming to an end. Bowman, an important theoretician in the group, turned to the Industrial Workers of the World, winning the ISEL to a dual unionist position. Those in the group opposed to this line left to form the Industrial Democracy League, and the ISEL dissolved soon after.

== Sources consulted ==
- Lorry, Anthony: Le syndicalisme révolutionnaire en Grande-Bretagne. Fondation Pierre Besnard. Retrieved September 2, 2007.
- White, Joseph (1990), "Syndicalism in a Mature Industrial Setting: the Case of Britain", in van der Linden, Marcel; Thorpe, Wayne (eds.), Revolutionary Syndicalism: an International Perspective, Aldershot: Scolar Press, pp. 101–118, ISBN 0-85967-815-6
- Holton, Robert J. (1985), "Revolutionary Syndicalism and the British Labour Movement", in Mommsen, Wolfgang J.; Husung, Hans-Gerhard (eds.), The Development of Trade Unionism in Great Britain and Germany, 1880-1914, The German Historical Institute, London: George Allen & Unwin, pp. 266–282, ISBN 0-04-940080-0
- Peter Barberis, John McHugh and Mike Tyldesley, Encyclopedia of British and Irish Political Organizations
