= Bulletin international du mouvement syndicaliste =

November 1911 issue

Bulletin international du mouvement syndicaliste (English: International Bulletin of the Syndicalist Movement) was a syndicalist periodical published from 1907 by Christiaan Cornelissen and from 1913 by the International Syndicalist Bureau in Amsterdam.

Cornelissen, a Dutch syndicalist living in Paris, was inspired to publish the bulletin after attending the 1907 Anarchist Congress in Amerdam. He published it until 1913, almost singlehandedly. In 1913, Cornelissen attended the First International Syndicalist Congress in London. The congress decided to create an international correspondence bureau in Amsterdam. Cornelissen, who not only attended the congress, but helped organize it, edited the bulletin in the name of the bureau from there on. Most of the organizations represented at the congress, including the Free Association of German Trade Unions, the Dutch National Labor Secretariat, the Italian Workers' Union, and the Spanish National Confederation of Labor both subscribed and contributed to the bulletin. In July 1914, however, the last regular issue was published. The January 1915 edition only declared the end of the bulletin's publication as a result of World War I.
