= First International Syndicalist Congress =

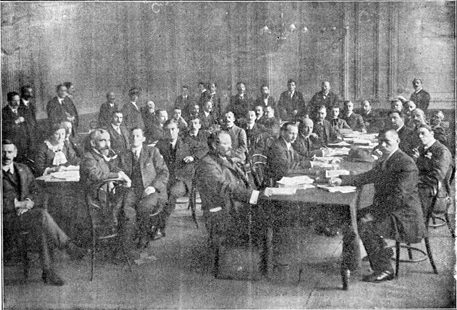
- A session of the congress
- Date: 27 September – 2 October 1913
- Venue: Holborn Town Hall
- Location: London, United Kingdom; 51.5169°N 0.1227°W
- Type: Congress
- Participants: National Labour Secretariat; Industrial Syndicalist Education League; Free Association of German Trade Unions; Central Organisation of Swedish Workers; Italian Syndicalist Union; Argentine Regional Workers' Federation; National Confederation of Labour
- Outcome: International Syndicalist Information Bureau established; Bulletin international du mouvement syndicaliste begins publication

The First International Syndicalist Congress was a meeting of European and Latin American syndicalist organizations at Holborn Town Hall in London from 27 September to 2 October 1913. Upon a proposal by the Dutch National Labour Secretariat (NAS) and the British Industrial Syndicalist Education League (ISEL), most European syndicalist groups, both trade unions and advocacy groups, agreed to congregate at a meeting in London. The only exception was the biggest syndicalist organization worldwide, the French General Confederation of Labour (CGT). Nevertheless, the congress was held with organizations from twelve countries participating. It was marked by heated debate and constant disagreements over both tactics and principles. Yet, it succeeded in creating the International Syndicalist Information Bureau as a vehicle of exchange and solidarity between the various organizations and the Bulletin international du mouvement syndicaliste as a means of communication. It would be viewed as a success by almost all who participated.

== Background ==
Syndicalism was a radical current in the labour movement of the early 20th century. Syndicalists viewed class interests as irreconcilable and advocating overthrowing capitalism and replacing it with workers' collectivized control of industry. To this end, syndicalist doctrine emphasized the importance of revolutionary trade unions, independent of all political parties. Unions had to be politically neutral or even hostile to political activity in order to unite the entire working class, though in practice anarchism played a significant role in syndicalist unions. Eschewing political means, syndicalists embraced direct action, particularly the strike, as the most natural weapon in the working class's struggle culminating in a revolutionary general strike. Finally, syndicalists embraced proletarian internationalism as they aimed to overcome national divisions and nationalism.

There was no international syndicalist organization prior to World War I. Syndicalists saw themselves as the heirs of the First International, the international socialist organization formed in 1864. The First International had two wings: one federalist and represented by the followers of Pierre-Joseph Proudhon and later by the anarchist Mikhail Bakunin and a centralist wing represented above all by Karl Marx. Syndicalists identified with the former. In 1889, the Second International was formed as an association of socialist parties and anarchists were expelled in 1893. The International Secretariat of National Trade Union Centers (ISNTUC) brought together trade unions, most of them highly centralized and affiliated with socialist parties. However, the French General Confederation of Labour (Confédération générale du travail in French, CGT), the largest syndicalist organization and the role model for syndicalist unions around the world, and the Dutch National Labour Secretariat (Nationaal Arbeids-Secretariaat in Dutch, NAS) also belonged. They sought to revolutionize ISNTUC from within, with limited success, so the Dutch left in protest in 1907.

November 1911 issue of the Bulletin international du mouvement syndicaliste

In 1909, the NAS declared: "To us it appears [...] necessary that the question of whether the isolation of revolutionary organizations is to be perpetuated should be posed seriously in every country" and suggested an international syndicalist congress. The Catalan syndicalist group Solidaridad Obrera, which would later become the National Confederation of Labour (CNT), was quick to support this proposal. The CGT was opposed, wanting to remain affiliated with ISNTUC. Such a congress was likely to cause a split between the radical and the reformist wings within the CGT. The French syndicalist leader Pierre Monatte convinced the Dutch to withdraw their proposal.

== Invitations ==
In February 1913, the British Industrial Syndicalist Education League (ISEL) and the NAS independently published very similar invitations to an international syndicalist congress. Both criticized the existing labour internationals, especially the reformist social democratic International Secretariat of National Trade Union Centers (ISNTUC), from which, according to the Dutch group, "all revolutionary propaganda [...] is excluded systematically." Likewise, its political counterpart, the Second International, was attacked by the British as a "body that exacts a pledge of parliamentarism and is composed of glib-tongued politicians who promise to do things for us, but cannot even if they wanted." Furthermore, the syndicalists lamented the lack of an international syndicalist organization. The British proposal called for the congress to be held in London, while the Dutch left this question open and called for suggestions for the site of the meeting.

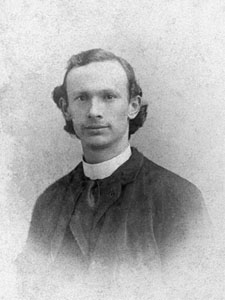
Christiaan Cornelissen

The invitations were immediately received warmly by numerous syndicalists, including the Free Association of German Trade Unions (Freie Vereinigung deutscher Gewerkschaften in German, FVdG), Pierre Ramus's journal Wohlstand für Alle from Austria, the Central Organisation of the Workers of Sweden (SAC), the Spanish periodical Tierra y Libertad, the Italian Syndicalist Union (Unione Sindacale Italiana in Italian, USI), the Industrial Workers of the World (IWW) in the United States, and the Syndicalist League of North America. Christiaan Cornelissen, editor of the Bulletin international du mouvement syndicaliste and a prominent anarchist in Paris, also welcomed the idea, but considered the May date proposed by ISEL too soon, as the decentralized decision-making employed by syndicalists required more time for preparation.

== French dissent ==
The French General Confederation of Labour (CGT), the largest syndicalist organization in the world, was critical of the proposal. It strove to radicalize ISNTUC from within. While in many countries both radical syndicalist and mainstream socialist labour federations existed, in France, there was only the syndicalist CGT. The FVdG in Germany, for example, where the ISNTUC-affiliated Free Trade Unions would not allow a rival organization from the country to join, did not have this possibility. The CGT wanted to preserve unity within the European labour movement, even with non-syndicalist groups, and was afraid affiliation with a syndicalist international would jeopardize its relations to the mainstream socialist unions. Moreover, the CGT was in a crisis. Reformists were rapidly gaining influence and making it harder to forge alliances with other radical unions.

Syndicalists outside of France rejected the CGT's view. Some held that the CGT could participate in the syndicalist congress while remaining in the ISNTUC. Others felt membership in the social democratic international and syndicalist doctrine were incompatible and considered revolutionizing the social democrats impossible. They warned that the CGT was straying from the revolutionary course by collaborating with the reformist social democrats. They pointed out that the French union already had a considerable reformist wing.

The French responded by pointing to the fact that the British ISEL's domestic policy was similar to its international aims. The ISEL did not constitute a union in its own right, but rather tried to infiltrate and radicalize existing unions, particularly the General Federation of Trade Unions. Pierre Monatte, a CGT leader, declared that if it were to change course, it would harm unionism in all of Europe. He also insisted that it would be impossible for the CGT to both participate in ISNTUC and the syndicalist congress.

Meanwhile, Cornelissen and the ISEL leaders Tom Mann and Guy Bowman adopted a new stance toward the CGT. Bowman expressed confidence that the CGT would change its mind once the congress came around. Mann offered the CGT that it could host the congress. Knowing the CGT as a whole would not change its position, the two attempted to draw the bourses du travail, the regional organizations of the CGT, to participate. Cornelissen, himself active in the French syndicalist movement, explicitly adopted this approach: "Is the French movement organized on the basis of the autonomy of local and regional unions or is it not?", he asked. These approaches were, however, largely unsuccessful, as the CGT leaders, even at a local level, were not impressed.

As the CGT did not participate, the New Statesman would later liken the congress to "playing Hamlet without the Prince of Denmark".

== Preparations ==
Discussion turned to the question of what the exact goal of the meeting should be. The Dutch NAS, the British ISEL, and the German FVdG felt that "the creation of an autonomous Syndicalist International is a necessity for the self-preservation and onward development of syndicalism", as Die Einigkeit, the organ of the Germans, put it. Opposition to this view came from two different directions. Cornelissen felt it would easier to attract French unions to a congress meant to establish international relations rather than the foundation of an international organization. Alceste De Ambris, a leader in the Italian USI, on the other hand argued that international secretariats like ISNTUC were useless. He preferred international congresses which could help the national federations break out of their isolation.

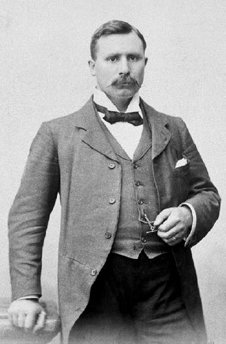
Tom Mann

Among the organizations endorsing the congress, most wished it take place in the Netherlands. In April, however, ISEL unilaterally announced the congress would take place in late September in London. Not wanting to start a dispute, the Dutch NAS gave in and agreed the meeting would take place in the UK. Soon thereafter problems with the organization of the congress turned up. ISEL was starting to break apart and shaken by internal disputes, especially between the leaders Tom Mann and Guy Bowman. Financial troubles further aggravated these problems. Cornelissen and Albert Jensen of the Swedish SAC voiced their concerns about how the preparations were going in June and July respectively. Bowman, then ISEL's sole leader as Mann was in the United States on a speaking tour, announced the congress would take place from 27 September to 2 October at Holborn Hall in London. He also announced an agenda for the meeting would be appearing soon, but he was not heard from for another while.

In August, the debate with the CGT flared up again. Writing in La Bataille Syndicaliste, Léon Jouhaux declared the CGT militants' solidarity with the syndicalist congress, yet made it very clear that his organization would not participate. Cornilessen used these remarks to point out to local leaders that it was up to them whether they came to London or not. De Ambris's response was more aggressive; he accused the CGT of desertion and reiterated his rejection of international secretariats, particularly of ISNTUC. In response, La Vie Ouvrière, the CGT's official organ, attacked both Cornelissen and De Ambris in a piece drafted by a number of leading French syndicalists, including Monatte, Jouhaux, Alphonse Merrheim, Alfred Rosmer, and Georges Dumoulin. It claimed the uses of the congress, the exchange of information and mutual aid between national federations, were outweighed by the risk of deepening schisms within the European labour movement, especially if a formal international organization was to be founded. In the course of the debate the tone became increasingly contentious. In his response, Cornelissen claimed the CGT was not "corresponding to the current development of our international syndicalist movement nor [...] particularly revolutionary." The IWW accused the CGT of being financed by the French government. The CGT fired back by claiming that Cornelissen did not understand syndicalism.

Meanwhile, preparations in London were scarcely coming along. It became necessary for Christiaan Cornelissen to travel to England to salvage the project. At the time, the Irish Transport and General Workers' Union, which had syndicalist elements, was involved in the Dublin Lockout and the British were focused on supporting this struggle. Bowman even suggested postponing the congress or holding it in secret, but Cornelissen would have none of it. Cornelissen with the help of some London-based supporters completed the preparations.

== Participation ==
The congress was attended by 38 delegates representing 65 organizations from Argentina, Austria, Belgium, Brazil, Cuba, France, Germany, Italy, the Netherlands, Poland, Spain, Sweden, and the United Kingdom with a total membership between 220,000 and 250,000. By contrast, in 1913 ISNTUC affiliates had a total membership of over seven million in 19 countries.

The congress in London was attended by delegates of many different kinds of organizations: educational and propaganda groups, national syndicalist confederations, union federations, local trade unions, local branches of national trade unions, local trades councils. All major European national syndicalist union confederations, except for the French CGT, sent delegates: the German FVdG, the Dutch NAS, the Swedish SAC, and the Italian USI. The Danish Fagsoppositionens Sammenslutning (FS) was represented by the SAC delegate Albert Jensen. Argentina was represented by two syndicalist confederations. The Argentine Regional Workers' Confederation (CORA) gave its mandate to the Italian Alceste De Ambris, while the more radical Argentine Regional Workers' Federation (FORA) sent a delegate of its own. The Brazilian Regional Workers' Federation, unable to send a delegate for financial reasons, opted to be represented by Guy Bowman. The Spanish National Confederation of Labour (CNT), banned at the time, was unable to have a representative travel to London, but the Catalan regional confederation was represented by a member exiled to France. Despite the CGT boycotting the meeting, a number of French delegates were present. The Paris hatters' union, six unions of construction workers from the capital, as well as three independent textile unions all sent delegates. The Belgian regional union Union des Syndicats de la Province de Liège was represented at the meeting, as was the Cuban Havana Union of Café Employees. From the United Kingdom, the hosts, ISEL, attended and a number of British trade unions sent a total of nine delegates. Thus, a total number of twelve countries from Europe and Latin America had delegates at the First International Syndicalist Congress. The Austrian Free Trade Unions Association was unable to raise the funds to send a representative and therefore adhered without actually being present. Additionally, the American Industrial Workers of the World (IWW) organizer George Swasey attended some of the sessions, though not as a delegate of his union. Cornelissen and the Russian anarcho-syndicalist Alexander Schapiro participated, but did not represent any organization. Alfred Rosmer of the CGT attended the congress as a correspondent for La Vie Ovrière.

== Voting rights and presidency ==
On 27 September, the First International Syndicalist Congress commenced. Among the first questions discussed was to what extent educational and propaganda groups should be able to participate. The Germans advocated admitting only representatives of trade unions, while the Dutch thought all organizations advocating syndicalist ideas should be permitted to participate in the discussions and vote on all issues. Discussions yielded a compromise allowing non-trade union organizations to take part in debates, yet barring them from voting on issues which would entail financial obligations on the part of the unions. This essentially disenfranchised ISEL, the meeting's hosts.

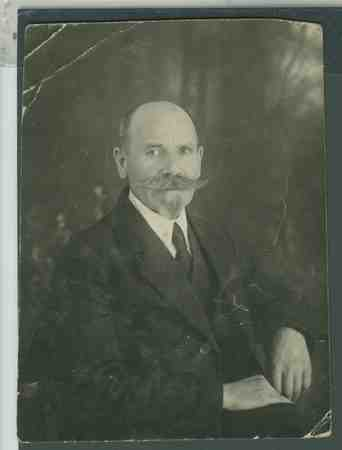
Fritz Kater

The next issue at hand was the presidency. Fritz Kater of the Free Association of German Trade Unions, Jack Wills of the Bermondsey and Leicester Trades Councils, and Guy Bowman ran for the post. Kater and Wills were elected co-presidents. Bowman along with Cornelissen was chosen as congress secretary and as a translator, a task he did not take very seriously forcing Alexander Schapiro to help out.

The second day of the congress was opened by a speech by Kater. He explained that the two most important tasks of the congress should be drafting a declaration of principles and to deciding upon how international cooperation between syndicalist groups would continue. However, instead of tackling these issues, the congress then plunged into a lengthy discussion on Wills' co-presidency: it was revealed that Wills was a local councilor in a London borough. A number of delegates, particularly from France and Spain, argued that a politician could not preside over a meeting of syndicalists opposed to the state. The Dutch delegates, on the other hand, argued that Wills' political involvement was irrelevant, as long as he was a syndicalist on economic and labour questions. Wills, himself, claimed that he was not a politician, since a borough councilor's duties were strictly administrative, while insisting that he was a fervent opponent of parliamentary politics. The dispute unveiled two different interpretations of syndicalist rejection of politics: the one advanced by the French and Spanish held that participation in the parliamentary process is in itself a hindrance to class struggle; the Dutch on the other hand sought to unify all workers, no matter their political or religious beliefs. Finally, Wills agreed to resign in order to end the dispute and was replaced by Jack Tanner of the Hammersmith Engineers.

== National reports and declaration of principles ==
Even after these issues were resolved, the congress did not turn its attention to the points raised by Kater. First, it discussed and condemned the police's treatment of Portuguese syndicalists and the British government's actions in the Dublin Lockout. Next, a series of national reports gave delegates the opportunity to learn about their allies' struggles in their respective countries. The most contentious of these reports were the two submitted by French unions. The first came from delegates, who were members of the CGT. They claimed that the French "revolutionary organization preserved its purely revolutionary aspect and refused to accept the interference of Parliamentarians" and remained "a driving force against militarism, patriotism, the State, and capitalism, and anything which prevented the march of the movement", even though the organization as a whole had decided to abstain from the London congress. A delegate representing several union that were not aligned with the CGT disagreed.

It was not until the fourth day that debate on the declaration of principles started. On the evening before, a resolution committee had discussed and revised a draft submitted by the Dutch. The committee's proposal was then debated by all delegates. The most controversial part of the draft was a sentence stating that "the proletariat can only effectively influence the state by methods of direct action". Opponents of this sentence held that the state should be ignored and that class struggle could only take place in the economic sphere. Its proponents, however, claimed that the proletariat lived under the political tyranny of the state just as it lived under the economic tyranny of capitalism and that neither could be ignored. De Ambris further complicated the discussion by calling for the phrase "political and economic" to be replaced by "capitalist system" throughout the text. The discussion on this question was prolonged and lively. It became a debate on the syndicalist rejection of statism. Support for De Ambris's position eventually ebbed and he gave in; the declaration that was finally unanimously accepted contained a number of references to the overthrow of the state.

This declaration rejected "capitalist slavery and State oppression", from which, "the working class of every country suffers". According to the document these wrongs, are "a necessary result of private property in the means of production and distribution". As a solution, the congress "declares for the socialization of such property by constructing and developing our Trade Unions in such a way as to fit them for the administration of these means in the interest of the entire community." However, the syndicalists felt "Trade Unions will only succeed when they cease to be divided by political and religious differences [and] by using Direct Action".

== Establishment of an international ==
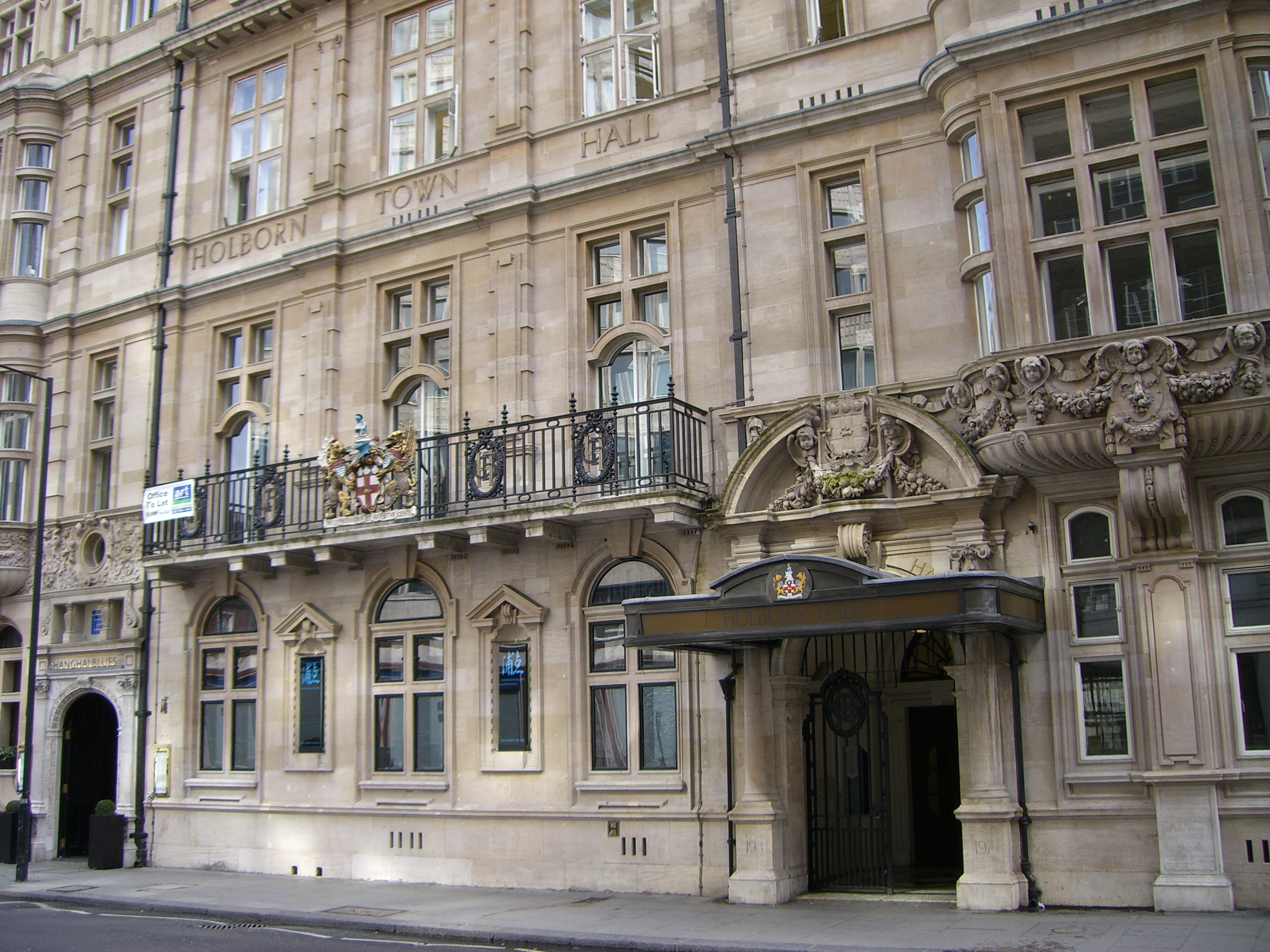
Holborn Town Hall today

Finally, delegates discussed the equally contentious issue of future international cooperation. Both the German FVdG and the Italian USI drafted proposals. The Germans advocated the creation of an international Syndicalist Secretariat seated in Amsterdam and administered by the Dutch NAS. The Italian proposal called for no more than a committee to maintain relations between syndicalist organizations.

At first the advocates of a Syndicalist International dominated the discussion. However, even many of the proponents favored postponing the creation to another congress. As expected, De Ambris argued vehemently against a formal international organization, but many of his arguments were new. He estimated that such an organization would include no more than half a million workers, an insignificant figure compared to the membership of ISNTUC. However, an Argentine delegate claimed De Ambris's numbers were wrong, stating that from South America alone, 600,000 would join a Syndicalist International. Much like the CGT in the run-up to the congress, De Ambris was now worried about deepening the schism within Europe's labour movement and thereby weakening it. He pointed to the CGT member unions at the meeting, saying they would be unable to go against their national and international affiliation, but would have no problems adhering to a committee of information. In his response, the German Karl Roche said that if the Italians were unwilling to join them, the Dutch and the Germans would start an international on their own. De Ambris sarcastically replied that he wanted to found an International as well, but without either the Germans or the Dutch.

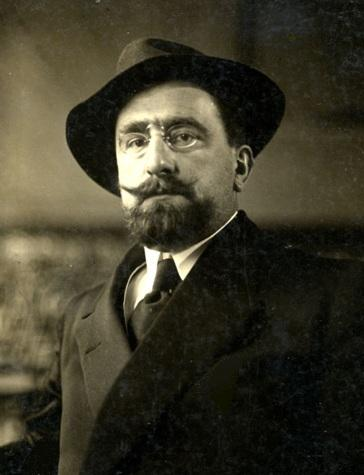
Alceste De Ambris

Eventually, Fritz Kater withdrew the German proposal. It had become clear that, even among the proponents of an International, most preferred putting the founding off for the moment. The creation of the International Syndicalist Information Bureau, upon which all participants agreed, was decided as a compromise. The question where it would be seated was the next controversial issue. Both the German FVdG and the Dutch NAS proposed Amsterdam. Once again, De Ambris strongly disagreed. He felt Paris was a better location and suggested the hat makers' union as its administrators. Most delegates, however, felt the bureau could be seated neither in Paris, because of the CGT, nor in Berlin, the location of ISNTUC's headquarters, and therefore agreed on Amsterdam. Bitterly opposed to this idea, De Ambris, who had already been critical of the voting procedures, which gave each delegate one vote, from the start, proposed giving each nation one vote, but a vote - by delegate - rejected his proposal. Angrily, De Ambris withdrew from the congress. The rest of the delegates then agreed that the Bureau would be managed by the NAS in Amsterdam. Its role would be to facilitate the exchange of information between the national groups, to cultivate syndicalist solidarity, and to organize future congresses. It would publish the Bulletin international du mouvement syndicaliste, thus far edited by Cornelissen, and draw its revenue from the subscriptions to this periodical. These decisions, except for the seat of the bureau, were made unanimously. Kater officially closed the congress calling for the remaining issues to be discussed at the next meeting to be held in Amsterdam.

== Results ==
In the end, only two out of the nine topics on the agenda, were discussed, the declaration of principles and the creation of an international body. Yet, all participants of the 1913 congress in London considered it a success, with the exception of Alceste De Ambris. He criticized the voting system and the choice for the Netherlands as the seat of the Information Bureau. The others unanimously applauded the congress's results. Christiaan Cornelissen was confident this was the first step to a new labour International. The German Die Einigkeit noted that the congress had accomplished the tasks set out in Fritz Kater's opening address. The Spanish delegate and Guy Bowman both viewed the meeting as a historic event. Many syndicalists viewed the formation of the Bureau as the congress's biggest accomplishment, some even claiming that there was no real difference between it and an International. The Argentine FORA called the Bureau a "purely worker and antistatist" International.

Reformists and French syndicalists were critical of the congress. The British Socialist Party's journal Justice labeled the declaration of principles "a strange mixture of Socialism and Anarchism", while the organ of the German Free Trade Unions claimed it "contains nothing but trite phrases". The congress itself, the German socialists declared, was "unquestionably a complete fiasco". Meanwhile, in his report for La Vie Ouvrière, Alfred Rosmer said the declaration of principles lacked clarity, predicted only the Germans, Dutch, and Swedes would truly adhere to the Information Bureau, and predicted the congress would be harmful to syndicalism and the labour movement in general.

In early 1914, the Dutch group established a permanent committee for the International Syndicalist Information Bureau, which took over publishing Bulletin international du mouvement syndicaliste, though Cornelissen continued to take care of most of the editorial duties. However, neither the Bureau nor the periodical lasted long. After World War I broke out in August 1914, both had to be terminated. After the war, the goal of a syndicalist International was realized. The International Working Men's Association (IWA), which exists to this day, was formed in 1923. Its founding congress in Berlin made reference to the 1913 First International Syndicalist Congress as its predecessor. The congress's declaration of principles was the classical expression of pre-war international syndicalism in the same way the Charter of Amiens was the classical expression of French syndicalism. It also expressed an evolution in syndicalist principles. Whereas the Charter made no reference to the state, the declaration explicitly condemned it, much like the post-war IWA did. Though all major British newspapers reported on the First International Syndicalist Congress, it has received little treatment since.

== Bibliography ==
- Gras, Christian (1971). Alfred Rosmer (1877-1964) et le mouvement révolutionnaire international (in French). Paris: Libraire François Maspero. OCLC 326598.
- Lehning, Arthur (1982). "Die Internationale Arbeiter-Assoziation (IAA): Ein Beitrag zur Theorie und Ideologie der anarchosyndikalistischen Internationale". Internationale Tagung der Historiker der Arbeiterbewegung: 16. Linzer Konferenz 1980. Vienna: Europaverlag. pp. 76–99. ISBN 3-20350-803-6.
- Thorpe, Wayne (1989). 'The Workers Themselves': Revolutionary Syndicalism and International Labour, 1913–1923. Amsterdam: Kluwer Academic Publishers. ISBN 0-7923-0276-1.
- Thorpe, Wayne (1990). "Syndicalist Internationalism before World War II". In van der Linden, Marcel; Thorpe, Wayne (eds.). Revolutionary Syndicalism: an International Perspective. Aldershot: Scolar Press. pp. 237–259. ISBN 0-85967-815-6.
- van der Linden, Marcel; Thorpe, Wayne (1990). "The Rise and Fall of Revolutionary Syndicalism". In van der Linden, Marcel; Thorpe, Wayne (eds.). Revolutionary Syndicalism: an International Perspective. Aldershot: Scolar Press. pp. 237–259. ISBN 0-85967-815-6.
- Westergard-Thorpe, Wayne (1978). "Towards a Syndicalist International: The 1913 London Congress". International Review of Social History. 13: 33–78. doi:10.1017/S0020859000005691. ISSN 0020-8590.
