= Syndicalism =

Form of revolutionary organisation

Syndicalism is a revolutionary socialist current within the broader labor movement that seeks to unionize workers according to industry and utilize these unions both as a means to advance their demands through strikes and other forms of direct action, and to usher in a social revolution that would establish social ownership and workers' control over the means of production and the economy at large.

Syndicalist unions first emerged in Spain and North America in the 1870s, before rising to prominence in France and later emerging on other continents. Syndicalist movements were most predominant amongst the socialist movement during the interwar period that preceded the outbreak of World War II. Major syndicalist organizations included the General Confederation of Labor (CGT) in France, the Confederacion Nacional del Trabajo (CNT) in Spain, the Italian Syndicalist Union (USI), the Free Workers' Union of Germany (FAUD), and the Argentine Regional Workers' Federation (FORA). Although they did not regard themselves as syndicalists, the Industrial Workers of the World (IWW) (nicknamed "Wobblies") in the United States, the Irish Transport and General Workers' Union (ITGWU), and the Canadian One Big Union (OBU) are considered by some historians to belong to this movement.

The International Workers' Association – Asociación Internacional de los Trabajadores (IWA–AIT), which was formed in 1922, is an international syndicalist federation of various labour unions from different countries. At its peak, it represented millions of workers and competed directly for the hearts and minds of the working class with social democratic unions and parties. A number of syndicalist organizations were and still are to this day linked in the IWA–AIT; some of its member organizations left for the International Confederation of Labour (ICL–CIT), which was formed in 2018.

== Terminology ==
The word syndicalism has French origins. In French, a syndicat is a trade union, usually a local union. A syndicate is a self organizing group working towards a shared interest. The corresponding words in Spanish and Portuguese, sindicato, and Italian, sindacato, are similar. By extension, the French syndicalisme refers to trade unionism in general. The concept of syndicalisme révolutionnaire or revolutionary syndicalism emerged in French socialist journals in 1903, and the French General Confederation of Labor (Confédération générale du travail, CGT) came to use the term to describe its brand of unionism. Revolutionary syndicalism, or more commonly syndicalism with the revolutionary implied, was then adapted to a number of languages by unionists following the French model. (Note: Of frequent criticism has been the transplantation of the term into languages in which the etymological link to unionism was lost. Opponents of syndicalism in Northern and Central Europe seized upon this to characterize it as something non-native, even dangerous. When the Free Association of German Trade Unions (Freie Vereinigung deutscher Gewerkschaften, FVdG) endorsed syndicalism in 1908, it did not at first use the term for fear of using "foreign names".)

Many scholars, including Ralph Darlington, Marcel van der Linden, and Wayne Thorpe, apply syndicalism to a number of organizations or currents within the labor movement that did not identify as syndicalist. They apply the label to one big unionists or industrial unionists in North America and Australia, Larkinists (named after the Irish ITGWU leader James Larkin) in Ireland, and groups that identify as revolutionary industrialists, revolutionary unionists, anarcho-syndicalists, or councilists. This includes the Industrial Workers of the World (IWW) in the United States, which claimed its industrial unionism was "a higher type of revolutionary labor organization than that proposed by the syndicalists". Van der Linden and Thorpe use syndicalism to refer to "all revolutionary, direct-actionist organizations". Darlington proposes that syndicalism be defined as "revolutionary trade unionism". (Note: Darlington adds that this definition does not encompass communist or socialist unions because, in his own words, the syndicalist conception "differed from both socialist and communist counterparts in viewing the decisive agency of the revolutionary transformation of society to be unions, as opposed to political parties or the state and of a collectivized worker-managed socio-economic order to be run by unions, as opposed to political parties or the state.") He and van der Linden argue that it is justified to group together such a wide range of organizations because their similar modes of action or practice outweigh their ideological differences.

Others, such as Larry Peterson and Erik Olssen, disagree with this broad definition. According to Olssen, this understanding has a "tendency to blur the distinctions between industrial unionism, syndicalism, and revolutionary socialism". Peterson gives a more restrictive definition of syndicalism based on five criteria:

1. A preference for federalism over centralism.
2. Opposition to political parties.
3. Seeing the general strike as the supreme revolutionary weapon.
4. Favoring the replacement of the state by "a federal, economic organization of society".
5. Seeing unions as the basic building blocks of a post-capitalist society.

This definition excludes the IWW and the Canadian One Big Union (OBU), which sought to unite all workers in one general organization. Peterson proposes the broader category revolutionary industrial unionism to encompass syndicalism, groups like the IWW and the OBU, and others.

== Emergence ==
=== Rise ===
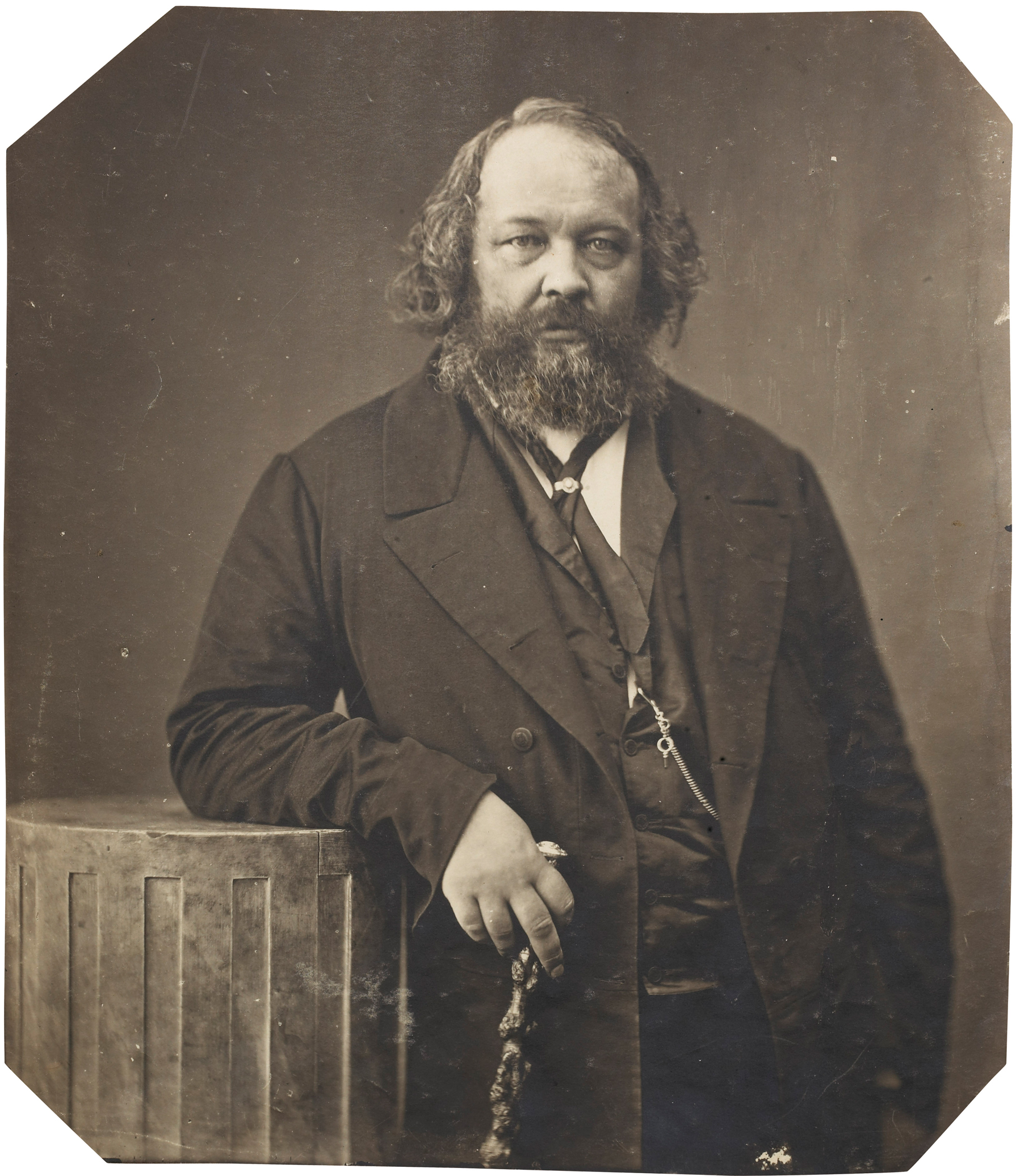
Mikhail Bakunin, an anarchist whom syndicalists viewed as an intellectual forerunner

Revolutionary industrial unionism, part of syndicalism in the broader sense, originated with the IWW in the United States and then caught on in other countries. In a number of countries, certain syndicalist practices and ideas predate the coining of the term in France or the founding of the IWW. In Bert Altena's view, a number of movements in Europe can be called syndicalist, even before 1900. According to the English social historian E. P. Thompson and the anarcho-syndicalist theorist Rudolf Rocker, there were syndicalist tendencies in Britain's labor movement as early as the 1830s. Syndicalism's direct roots were in Pierre-Joseph Proudhon's mutualism, a form of socialism that focused on cooperation among the community of man. He coined capitalist to describe the political class granting itself monopolies on the use of capital, and wanted workers to oppose this state control through peaceful means, only using force defensively. Proudhon's ideas were popular in the anti-authoritarian wing of the early International Workingmen's Association (IWA), the first international socialist organization, formed in 1864. Its most successful early leader, Russian anarchist Mikhail Bakunin, came to believe that worker organizations should consider using force to advance their cause, when necessary. He and his followers advocated the general strike, rejected electoral politics, and anticipated workers' organizations replacing rule by the state, central syndicalist themes.

According to Lucien van der Walt, the Spanish Regional Federation of the IWA, which was formed in 1870, was in fact syndicalist. Kenyon Zimmer sees a "proto-syndicalism" in the influence the anarchist-led International Working People's Association (IWPA) and Central Labor Union, which originated in the American section of the First International, had in the Chicago labor movement of the 1880s. They were involved in the nationwide struggle for an eight-hour day. On 3 May 1886, the police killed three striking workers at a demonstration in Chicago. Seven policemen and four workers were killed the following day when someone, possibly a police member, threw a bomb into the crowd. Four anarchists were eventually executed for allegedly conspiring to the events. The Haymarket Affair, as these events became known, led anarchists and labor organizers, including syndicalists, in both the United States and Europe to re-evaluate the revolutionary meaning of the general strike.

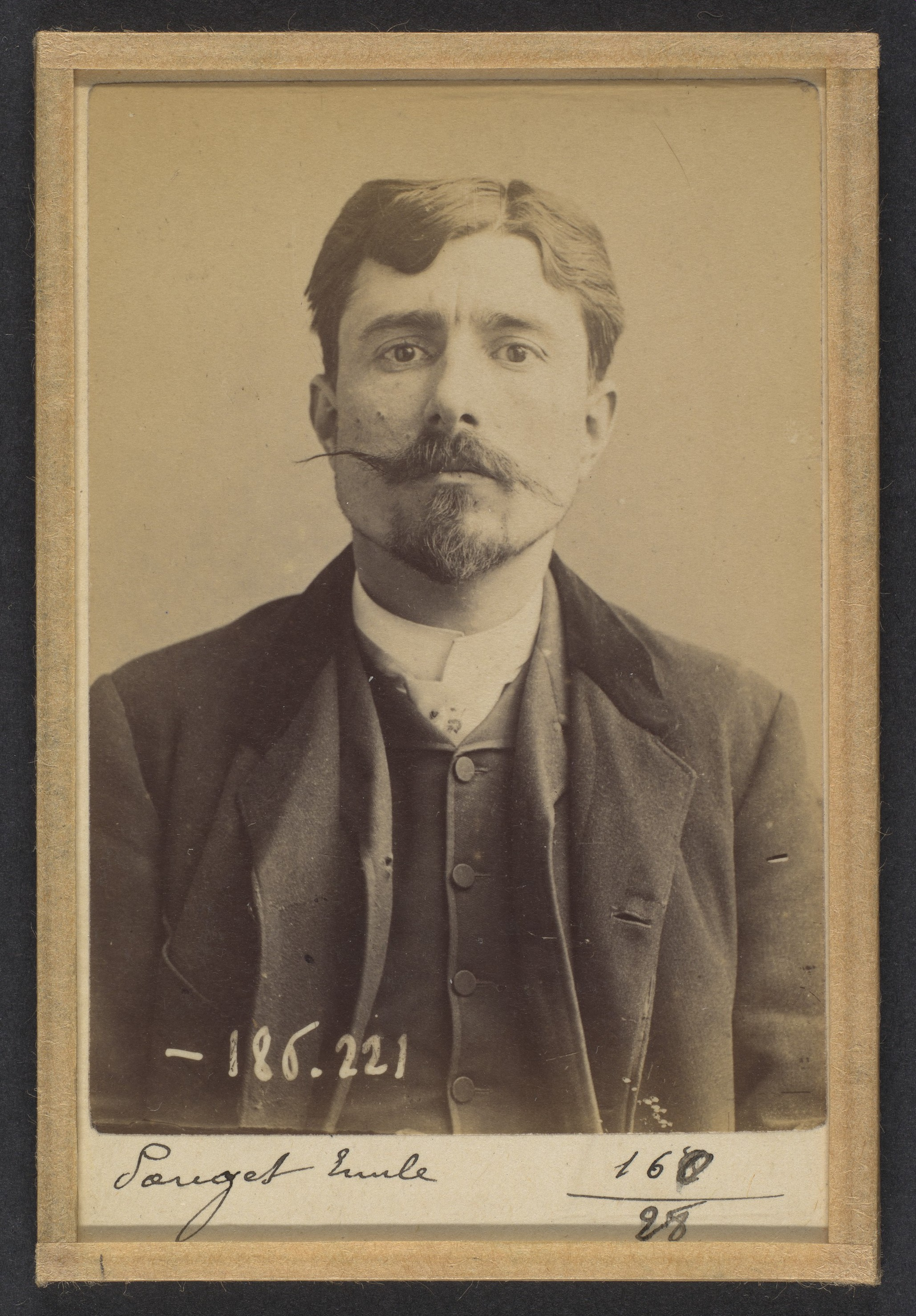
French syndicalist leader Émile Pouget

According to Émile Pouget, a French anarchist and CGT leader, from "the United States, the idea of the general strike – fertilized by the blood of anarchists hanged in Chicago ... – was imported to France". In the 1890s, French anarchists, conceding that individual action such as assassinations had failed, turned their focus to the labor movement. They were able to gain influence, particularly in the bourses du travail, which served as labor exchanges, meeting places for unions, and trades councils and organized in a national federation in 1893. In 1895, the CGT was formed as a rival to the bourses but was at first much weaker. From the start, it advocated the general strike and aimed to unite all workers. Pouget, who was active in the CGT, supported the use of sabotage and direct action. In 1902, the bourses merged into the CGT. In 1906, the federation adopted the Charter of Amiens, which reaffirmed the CGT's independence from party politics and fixed the goal of uniting all French workers.

In 1905, the Industrial Workers of the World were formed in the United States by the Western Federation of Miners, the American Labor Union, and a broad coalition of socialists, anarchists, and labor unionists. Its base was mostly in the Western United States, where labor conflicts were most violent and workers therefore radicalized. Although the Wobblies insisted their union was a distinctly American form of labor organization and not an import of European syndicalism, the IWW was syndicalist in the broader sense of the word. According to Melvyn Dubofsky and most other IWW historians, the IWW's industrial unionism was the specifically American form of syndicalism. Nevertheless, the IWW also had a presence in Canada and Mexico nearly from its inception, as the United States economy and labor force was intertwined with those countries.

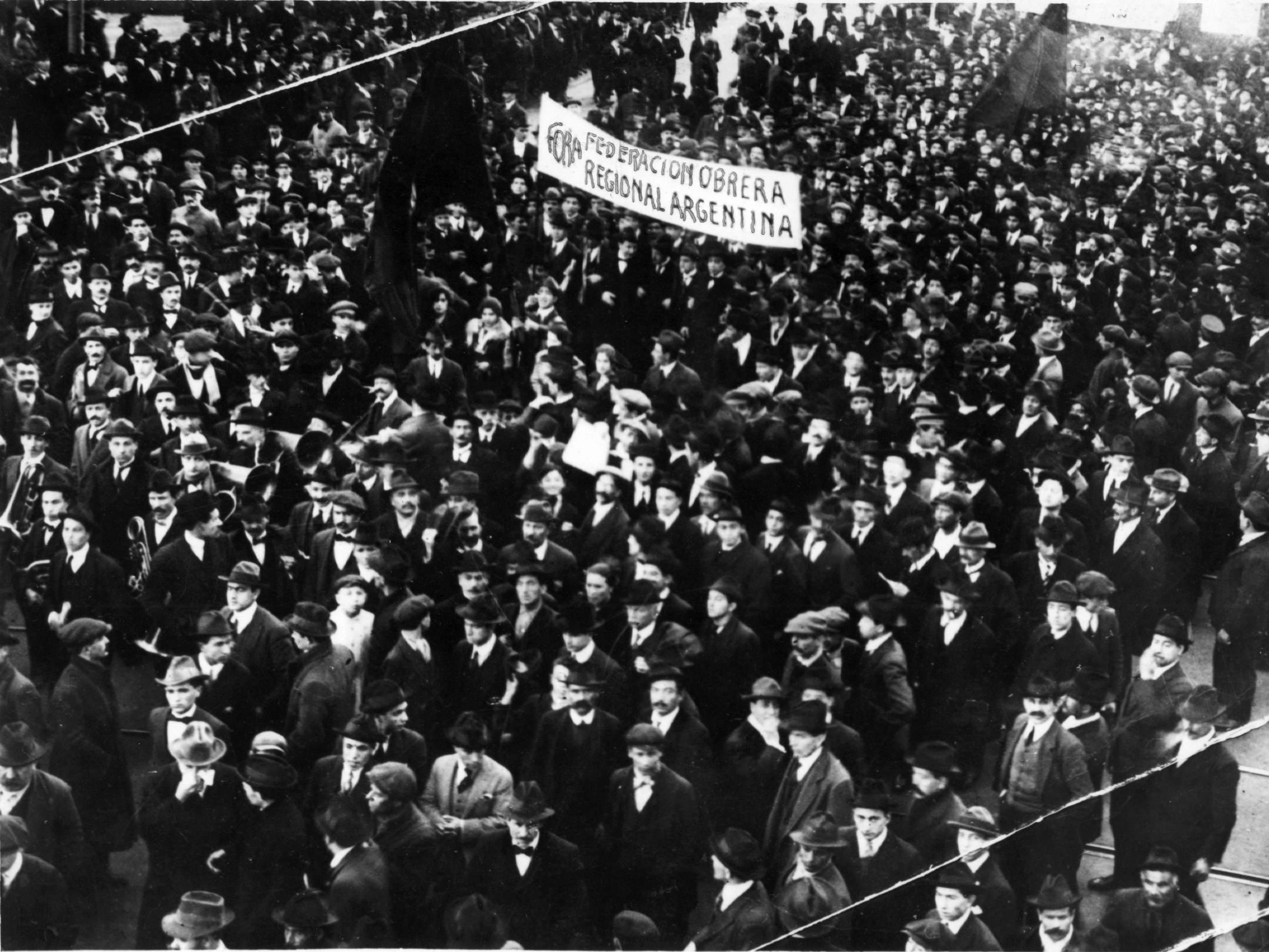
Demonstration by the Argentine syndicalist union FORA in 1915

French syndicalism and American industrial unionism influenced the rise of syndicalism elsewhere. Syndicalist movements and organizations in a number of countries were established by activists who had spent time in France. Ervin Szabó visited Paris in 1904 and then established a Syndicalist Propaganda Group in his native Hungary in 1910. Several of the founders of the Spanish CNT had visited France. Alceste de Ambris and Armando Borghi, both leaders in Italy's USI, were in Paris for a few months from 1910 to 1911. French influence also spread through publications. Pouget's pamphlets could be read in Italian, Spanish, Portuguese, English, German, and Swedish translations. Journals and newspapers in a number of countries advocated syndicalism. For example, L'Action directe, a journal mainly for miners in Charleroi, Belgium, urged its readers to follow "the example of our confederated friends of France". The IWW's newspapers published articles on French syndicalism, particularly the tactic of sabotage and the CGT's La Vie Ouvrière carried articles about Britain's labor movement by the British syndicalist Tom Mann. Migration played a key role in spreading syndicalist ideas. The Argentine Regional Workers' Federation (Federación Obrera Regional Argentina, FORA), openly anarchist by 1905, was formed by Italian and Spanish immigrants in 1901. Many IWW leaders were European immigrants, including Edmondo Rossoni who moved between the United States and Italy and was active in both the IWW and USI. International work processes also contributed to the diffusion of syndicalism. For example, sailors helped establish IWW presences in port cities around the world.

Syndicalists formed different kinds of organizations. Some like the French radicals worked within existing unions to infuse them with their revolutionary spirit. Some found existing unions entirely unsuitable and built federations of their own, a strategy known as dual unionism. American syndicalists formed the IWW, although William Z. Foster later abandoned the IWW after a trip to France and set up the Syndicalist League of North America (SLNA), which sought to radicalize the established American Federation of Labor (AFL). In Ireland, the ITGWU broke away from a more moderate, and British-based, union. In Italy and Spain, syndicalists initially worked within the established union confederations before breaking away and forming USI and the CNT respectively. In Norway, there were both the Norwegian Trade Union Opposition (Norske Fagopposition, NFO), syndicalists working within the mainstream Norwegian Confederation of Trade Unions (Landsorganisasjonen i Norge in Norwegian, LO), and the Norwegian Syndicalist Federation (Norsk Syndikalistik Federation in Norwegian, NSF), an independent syndicalist organization set up by the Swedish SAC. There was a similar conflict between the Industrial Syndicalist Education League and the Industrial Workers of Great Britain.

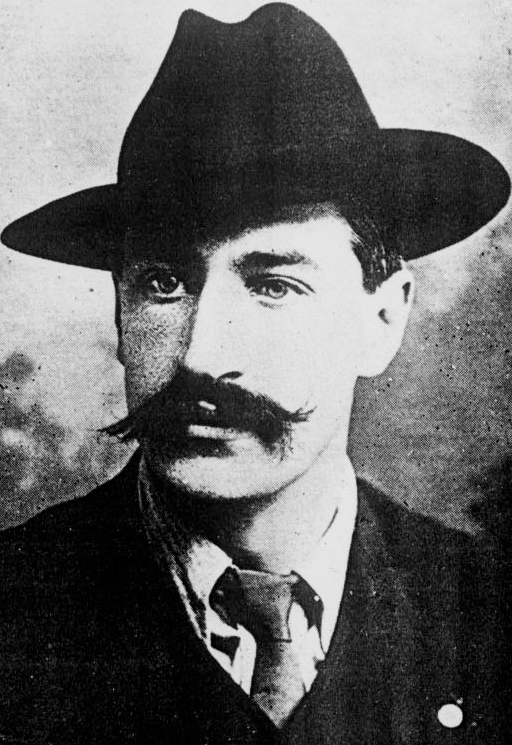
James Larkin, on whom Larkinism was centred

By 1914, there were syndicalist national labor confederations in Peru, Brazil, Argentina, Mexico, the Netherlands, Germany, Sweden, Spain, Italy, and France, while Belgian syndicalists were in the process of forming one. There were also groups advocating syndicalism in Russia, Japan, the United States, Portugal, Norway, Denmark, Hungary, and Great Britain. Outside of North America, the IWW also had organizations in Australia, New Zealand, where it was part of the Federation of Labour (FOL), Great Britain even though its membership had imploded by 1913, and South Africa. In Ireland, syndicalism took the form of the Irish Transport and General Workers' Union (ITGWU), which espoused a mix of industrial unionism and socialist Irish republicanism, and was labeled Larkinism.

=== Reasons for creation ===
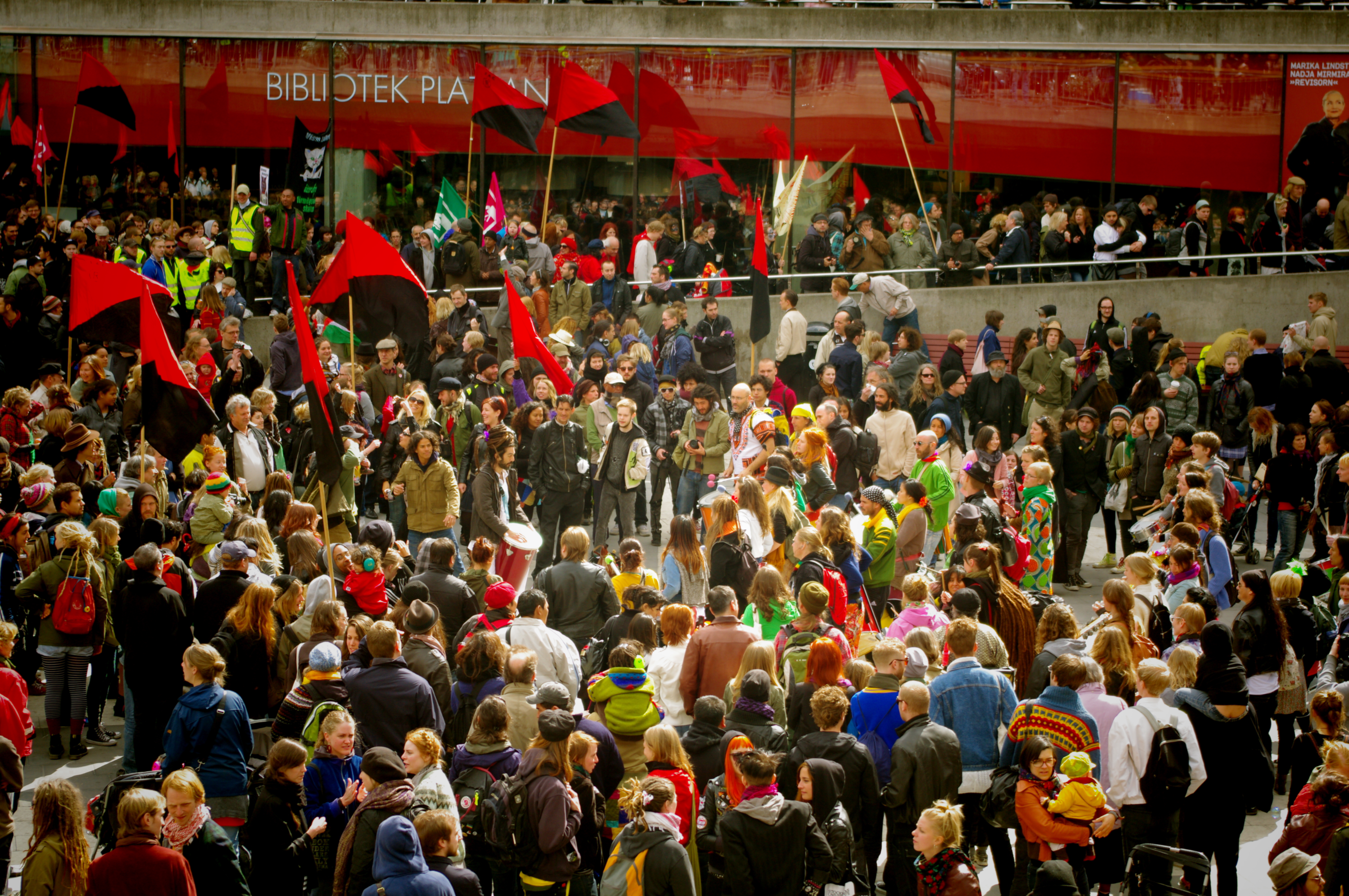
Syndicalist mayday in Stockholm, 2010

There was a significant uptick in workers' radicalism in most developed capitalist states from 1911 to 1922, although it relented during World War I. Strikes increased in frequency, numbers of workers involved, and duration. According to van der Linden and Thorpe, syndicalism was only one way this radicalization expressed itself. In the United Kingdom, the period from 1910 to 1914 became known as the Great Labour Unrest. While many historians see syndicalism as a consequence of this unrest, Elie Halévy and the politician Lord Robert Cecil argue it was its cause. Employers in France likewise blamed an upsurge in workers' militancy in the same period on syndicalist leaders. Syndicalism was further encouraged by employers' hostility to workers' actions. The economist Ernesto Screpanti hypothesized that strike waves like the one from 1911 to 1922 generally occur during the upper turning-points of the periodic global long cycles of boom and bust known as Kondratieff waves. He argued that such waves of proletarian insurgency were global in reach, saw workers breaking free of the dynamics of the capitalist system, and aimed to overthrow that system.

According to van der Linden and Thorpe, workers' radicalization manifested itself in their rejection of the dominant strategies in the labor movement, which was led by reformist trade unions and socialist parties. Vladimir Lenin posited that "revolutionary syndicalism in many countries was a direct and inevitable result of opportunism, reformism and parliamentary cretinism." A feeling that ideological disputes were draining workers' power led Dutch, French, and American syndicalist organizations to declare themselves independent of any political groups. In countries like Italy, Spain, and Ireland, which was still under British rule, parliamentary politics were not seen as a serious means for workers to express their grievances. Most workers were disenfranchised, yet even in France or Britain, where most male workers had the right to vote, many workers did not trust party politics. The enormous numerical growth of well-organized socialist parties, such as in Germany and Italy, did not correlate with any real advance in the class struggle in the minds of many workers, as these parties were thought to be overly concerned with building the parties themselves and with electoral politics than with the class struggle, and had therefore lost their original revolutionary edge. The socialists preached the inevitability of socialism but were in practice bureaucratic and reformist. Similarly, the trade unions frequently allied with those parties, equally growing in numbers, were denounced for their expanding bureaucracies, their centralization, and for failing to represent workers' interests. Between 1902 and 1913, the German Free Trade Unions' membership grew by 350%, but its internal administrative apparatus grew by more than 1900%.

Another common explanation for the rise of syndicalism is that it was a result of the economic backwardness of the countries in which it emerged, particularly France. Newer studies have questioned this account. According to van der Linden and Thorpe, changes in labor processes contributed to the radicalization of workers and thereby to the rise of syndicalism. This rise took place during the Second Industrial Revolution. Two groups of workers were most attracted to syndicalism: casual or seasonal laborers who frequently changed jobs, and workers whose occupations were becoming obsolete as a result of technological advances. The first group included landless agricultural workers, construction workers, and dockers, all of whom were disproportionately represented in several countries' syndicalist movements. Because they frequently changed jobs, such workers did not have close relationships with their employers and the risk of losing one's job as a result of a strike was reduced. Moreover, because of the time constraints of their jobs they were forced to act immediately in order to achieve anything and could not plan for the long term by building up strike funds or powerful labor organizations or by engaging in mediation. Their working conditions gave them an inclination to engage in direct confrontation with employers and apply direct action. The second group included miners, railway employees, and certain factory workers. Their occupations were deskilled by technological and organizational changes. These changes made workers from the second group similar in some respects to the first group. They did not entirely result from the introduction of new technology but were also caused by changes in management methods. This included increased supervision of workers, piecework, internal promotions, all designed make workers docile and loyal and to transfer knowledge and control over the process of production from workers to employers. Frustration with this loss of power led to formal and informal resistance by workers. Altena disagrees with this explanation. According to him, it was workers with significant autonomy in their jobs and pride in their skills who were most attracted to syndicalism. Moreover, he argues that explanations based on workers' occupations cannot explain why only a minority of workers in those jobs became syndicalists or why in some professions workers in different locations had vastly different patterns of organization. The small size of many syndicalist unions also makes observations about which workers joined statistically irrelevant.

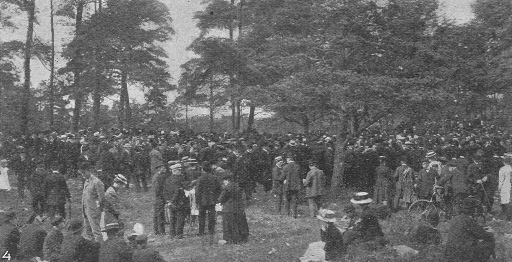
Meeting during the 1909 general strike in Sweden

Syndicalism came to be seen as a viable strategy because the general strike became a practical possibility. Although it had been advocated before, there were not sufficient numbers of wage workers to bring society to a standstill and they had not achieved a sufficient degree of organization and solidarity until the 1890s, according van der Linden and Thorpe. Several general or political strikes then took place before World War I: in 1893 and in 1902 in Belgium, in 1902 and in 1909 in Sweden, in 1903 in the Netherlands, and in 1904 in Italy, in addition to significant work stoppages during the Russian Revolution of 1905.

Darlington cites the significance of the conscious intervention by syndicalist militants. The industrial unrest of the period created conditions which made workers receptive to syndicalist leaders' agitation. They spread their ideas through pamphlets and newspapers and had considerable influence in a number of labor disputes. Finally, van der Linden and Thorpe point to spatial and geographical factors that shaped the rise of syndicalism. Workers who would otherwise not have had an inclination to syndicalism joined because syndicalism was dominant in their locales. For example, workers in the Canadian and American West were generally more radical and drawn to the IWW and One Big Union than their counterparts in the East. Similarly, southern workers were more drawn to syndicalism in Italy. According to Altena, the emergence of syndicalism must be analyzed at the level of local communities. Only differences in local social and economic structures explain why some towns had a strong syndicalist presence, while others did not.

== Principles ==
Émile Pouget, a CGT leader, asserted: "What sets syndicalism apart from the various schools of socialism – and makes it superior – is its doctrinal sobriety. Inside the unions, there is little philosophising. They do better than that: they act!" Similarly, Andreu Nin of the Spanish CNT proclaimed in 1919: "I am a fanatic of action, of revolution. I believe in actions more than in remote ideologies and abstract questions." Although workers' education was important at least to committed activists, syndicalists distrusted bourgeois intellectuals, wanting to maintain workers' control over the movement. Syndicalist thinking was elaborated in pamphlets, leaflets, speeches, and articles and in the movement's own newspapers. These writings consisted mainly in calls to action and discussions of tactics in class struggle. The philosopher Georges Sorel's Reflections on Violence introduced syndicalist ideas to a broader audience. Sorel presented himself as the premier theorist of syndicalism and was frequently thought of as such but was not a part of the movement, and his influence on syndicalism was insignificant, except in Italy and Poland.

The extent to which syndicalist positions reflected merely the views of leaders and to what extent those positions were shared by syndicalist organizations' rank-and-file is a matter of dispute. Commenting on French syndicalism, the historian Peter Stearns concludes that most workers did not identify with syndicalism's long-range goals, and that syndicalist hegemony accounts for the relatively slow growth of the French labor movement as a whole. He says that workers who joined the syndicalist movement were on the whole indifferent to doctrinal questions, their membership in syndicalist organizations was partly accidental, and leaders were unable to convert workers to syndicalist ideas. Frederick Ridley, a political scientist, is more equivocal. According to him, leaders were very influential in the drafting of syndicalist ideas. Syndicalism was more than a mere tool of a few leaders, and was a genuine product of the French labor movement. Darlington adds that most members in the Irish ITGWU were won over by the union's philosophy of direct action. Altena argues that, even though evidence of ordinary workers' convictions is scant, it indicates that they were aware of doctrinal differences between various currents in the labor movement and able to defend their own views. He observes that they likely understood syndicalist newspapers and debated political issues.

Syndicalism is used by some interchangeably with anarcho-syndicalism. This term was first used in 1907 by socialists criticizing the political neutrality of the CGT, although it was rarely used until the early 1920s when communists used it disparagingly. Only from 1922 was it used by self-avowed anarcho-syndicalists. Although syndicalism has traditionally been seen as a current within anarchism, it was dominated in some countries by Marxists rather than anarchists. This was the case in Italy and much of the Anglophone world, including Ireland where anarchists had no significant influence on syndicalism. The extent to which syndicalist doctrine was a product of anarchism is debated. The anarchist Iain McKay argues that syndicalism is but a new name for ideas and tactics developed by Bakunin and the anarchist wing of the First International, while it is wholly inconsistent with positions Marx and Engels took. According to him, the fact that many Marxists embraced syndicalism merely indicates that they abandoned Marx's views and converted to Bakunin's. Altena too views syndicalism as part of the broader anarchist movement but concedes there was a tension between this and the fact that it was also a labor movement. He also sees Marxist ideas reflected in the movement, as leading syndicalists, such as Ferdinand Domela Nieuwenhuis and Christiaan Cornelissen, and much of the Australian syndicalist movement were influenced by them, as well as older socialist notions. According to Darlington, anarchism, Marxism, and revolutionary trade unionism equally contributed to syndicalism, in addition to various influences in specific countries, including Blanquism, anti-clericalism, republicanism, and agrarian radicalism.

=== Critique of capitalism and the state ===
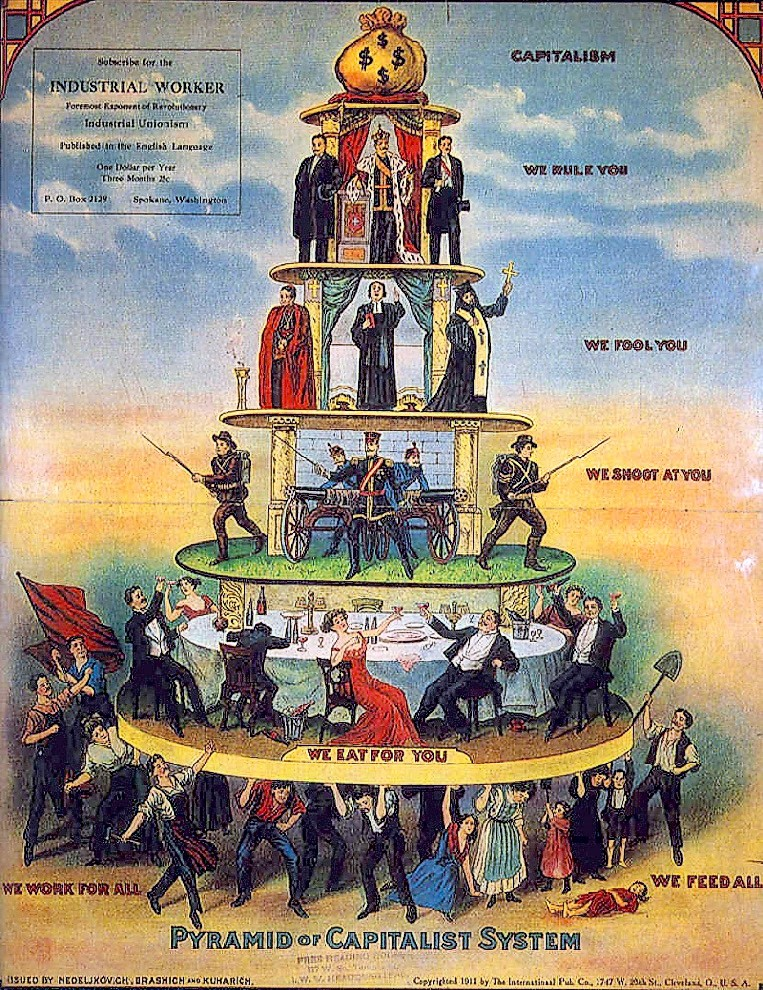
The Pyramid of Capitalist System from 1911 illustrates the IWW's critique of capitalism.

Bill Haywood, an American syndicalist and leading figure in the IWW, defined the union's purpose at the First Convention of the Industrial Workers of the World as "the emancipation of the working class from the slave bondage of capitalism". Syndicalists held that society was divided into two great classes, the working class and the bourgeoisie. Their interests being irreconcilable, they must be in a constant state of class struggle. Tom Mann, a British syndicalist, declared that "the object of the unions is to wage the Class War". According to syndicalist doctrine, this war was aimed not just at gaining concessions such as higher wages or a shorter working day but at the revolutionary overthrow of capitalism.

Syndicalists agreed with Karl Marx's characterization of the state as the "executive committee of the ruling class". They held that a society's economic order determined its political order and concluded that the former could not be overthrown by changes to the latter. Nevertheless, a number of leading syndicalist figures worked in political parties and some ran for elected office. Larkin was active in the Labour Party, while Haywood was part of the Socialist Party of America. Both of them saw the economic sphere as the primary arena for revolutionary struggle, and involvement in politics could at best be an echo of industrial struggle. They were skeptical of parliamentary politics. According to Thomas Hagerty, a Catholic priest and IWW leader, "dropping pieces of paper into a hole in a box never did achieve emancipation for the working class, and to my thinking it will never achieve it." Syndicalist trade unions declared their political neutrality and autonomy from political parties. Syndicalists reasoned that political parties grouped people according to their political views, uniting members of different classes, while unions were to be purely working-class organizations, uniting the entire class, and could therefore not be divided on political grounds. The French syndicalist Pouget explained: "The CGT embraces – outside of all the schools of politics – all workers cognisant of the struggle to be waged for the elimination of wage-slavery and the employer class." In practice, this neutrality was more ambiguous. For example, the CGT worked with the French Section of the Workers' International in the struggle against the Three-Year Law of 1913, which extended conscription. During the Spanish Civil War, the CNT, whose policy barred anyone who had been a candidate for political office or had participated in political endeavors from representing it, was intimately connected with the Iberian Anarchist Federation (Federación Anarquista Ibérica, FAI).

=== Views on class struggle ===
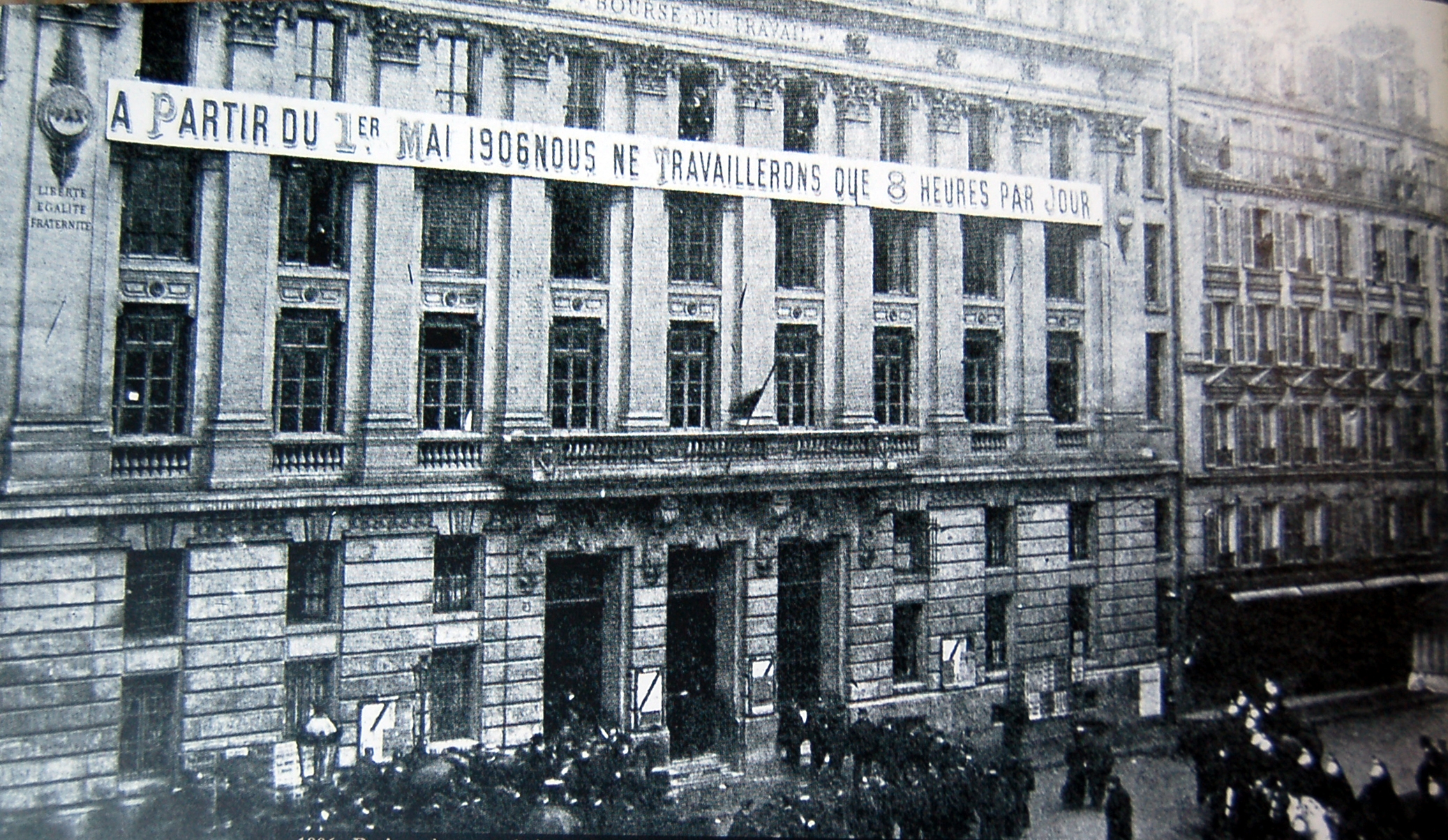
Bourse du travail in Paris during a strike for the eight-hour day in 1906

In the syndicalist conception, unions played a dual role. They were organs of struggle within capitalism for better working conditions, and they were also to play a key role in the revolution to overthrow capitalism. Victor Griffuelhes expressed this at the CGT's 1906 congress in the following manner: "In its day-to-day demands, syndicalism seeks the co-ordination of workers' efforts, the increase of workers' well-being by the achievement of immediate improvements, such as the reduction of working hours, the increase of wages, etc. But this task is only one aspect of the work of syndicalism; it prepares for complete emancipation, which can be realised only by expropriating the capitalist class." For unions to fulfill this role, it was necessary to prevent bureaucrats – "whose sole purpose in life seems to be apologising for and defending the capitalist system of exploitation", according to Larkin – from inhibiting workers' militant zeal. Battling bureaucracy and reformism within the labor movement was a major theme for syndicalists. One expression of this was many syndicalists' rejection of collective bargaining agreements, which were thought to force labor peace upon workers and break their solidarity. The Wobblie Vincent St. John declared: "There is but one bargain that the Industrial Workers of the World will make with the employing class – complete surrender of the means of production." The Argentine Regional Workers' Federation (Federación Obrera Regional Argentina, FORA) and the OBU accepted such deals, and others began accepting them eventually. Similarly, syndicalist unions did not work to build large strike funds, for fear that they would create bureaucracy separate from the rank-and-file and instill in workers the expectation that the union rather than they would wage the class struggle.

The black cat used by the Wobblies as a symbol for sabotage

Syndicalists advocated direct action, including working to rule, passive resistance, sabotage, and strikes, particularly the general strike, as tactics in the class struggle, as opposed to indirect action such as electoral politics. The IWW engaged in around 30 mostly successful civil disobedience campaigns they deemed free speech fights. Wobblies would defy laws restricting public speeches, in order to clog up prisons and court systems as a result of hundreds of arrests, ultimately forcing public officials to rescind such laws. Sabotage ranged from slow or inefficient work to destruction of machinery and physical violence. French railway and postal workers cut telegraph and signal lines during strikes in 1909 and 1910.

The final step towards revolution according to syndicalists would be a general strike. According to Griffuelhes, it would be "the curtain drop on a tired old scene of several centuries, and the curtain raising on another". Syndicalists remained vague about the society they envisioned to replace capitalism, stating that it was impossible to foresee in detail. Labor unions were seen as being the embryo of a new society in addition to being the means of struggle within the old. Syndicalists generally agreed that in a free society production would be managed by workers. The state apparatus would be replaced by the rule of workers' organizations. In such a society, individuals would be liberated in the economic sphere but also in their private and social lives.

=== Gender ===
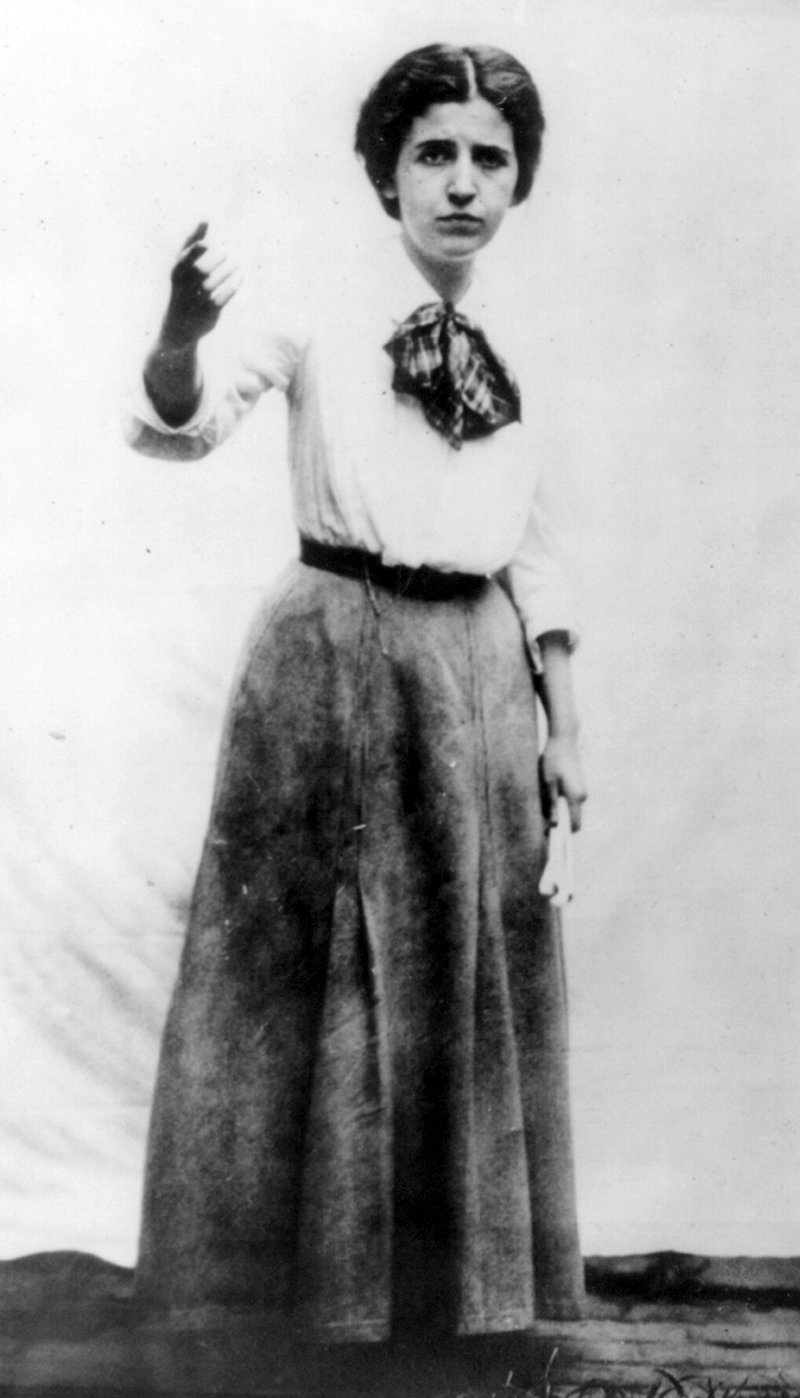
Elizabeth Gurley Flynn, a Wobbly organizer

Syndicalist policies on gender issues were mixed. The CNT did not admit women as members until 1918. The CGT dismissed feminism as a bourgeois movement. Syndicalists were mostly indifferent to the question of women's suffrage. Elizabeth Gurley Flynn, an IWW organizer, insisted that women "find their power at the point of production where they work" rather than at the ballot box. Of the 230 delegates present at the founding of Canada's One Big Union, a mere 3 were women. When a female radical criticized the masculinist atmosphere at the meeting, she was rebuffed by men who insisted that labor only concern itself with class rather than gender issues. The historian Todd McCallum concludes that syndicalists in the OBU advocated values of "radical manhood".

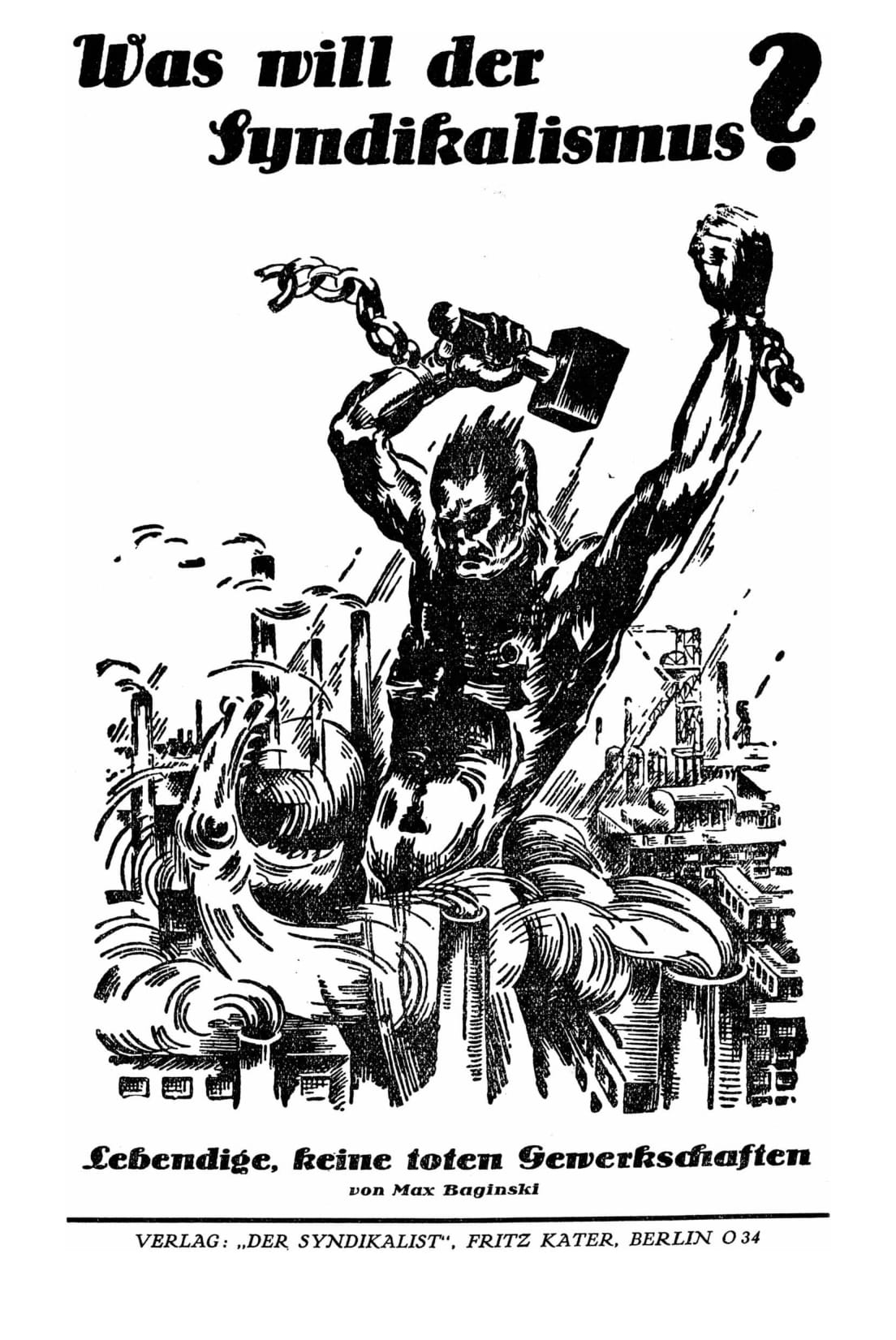
Cover of "Was will der Syndikalismus?" ("What does Syndicalism want?"), a pamphlet written by Max Baginski and published by German syndicalists

Francis Shor argues that the "IWW promotion of sabotage represents a kind of masculine posturing which directly challenged the individualizing techniques of power mobilized by industrial capitalism". Thus, "the IWW's masculine identity incorporated features of working-class solidarity and protest ... through 'virile' syndicalism." For example, while defending a black fellow worker against a racist insult, an IWW organizer in Louisiana insisted that "he is a man, a union man, an IWW—a MAN! ... and he has proven it by his action." During World War I, one of the IWW's anti-war slogans was "Don't Be a Soldier! Be a Man!" In some cases, syndicalist attitudes towards women changed. In 1901, the CGT's agricultural union in southern France was hostile to women; by 1909, this had changed. The CNT, initially hostile to independent women's organizations, worked closely with the libertarian feminist organization Mujeres Libres during the Spanish Civil War. According to the historian Sharif Gemie, the male orientation of parts of the syndicalist labor movement reflected the ideas of the anarchist Pierre-Joseph Proudhon, who defended patriarchy because women, of their own accord, are "chained to nature".

== Heyday ==
=== Before World War I ===
Syndicalists were involved in a number of strikes, labor disputes, and other struggles. In the United States, the IWW was involved in at least 150 strikes including the Goldfield, Nevada, labor troubles of 1906–1907 by miners' strikes, the Pressed Steel Car strike of 1909, the 1912 Lawrence textile strike, the Brotherhood of Timber Workers' strikes in Louisiana and Arkansas in 1912–1913, and the 1913 Paterson silk strike. The most prominent was the struggle in Lawrence. Wobblie leaders brought together 23,000 mostly immigrant workers, many of whom did not speak English. They arranged for workers' children to be sent to live with sympathetic families outside of Lawrence for the duration of the strike so their parents could focus on the struggle. Unlike most IWW-led strikes, the struggle was successful. In Mexico, syndicalism first emerged in 1906 during the violent Cananea strike by miners and the even more violent Río Blanco strike by textile workers. In 1912, during the Mexican Revolution of 1910–1920, anarchists formed the syndicalist union House of the World Worker (Casa del Obrero Mundial). It led a series of successful strikes in 1913 in Mexico City and central Mexico. After the Constitutionalist Army occupied the capital in 1914, syndicalists allied with the government it established to defeat rural forces such as the Zapatistas and therefore received government support. Once those forces had been suppressed, this alliance broke apart and the Casa campaigned for workers' control of factories and the nationalization of foreign capital. It contributed to a rise in labor unrest that began in mid-1915. It led general strikes in May and in July–August 1916 in greater Mexico City. The latter was quelled by the army, marking the defeat of the Casa, which was also suppressed.

In Portugal, the 5 October 1910 revolution that led to the deposition of the king was followed by a strike wave throughout the country. After the police occupied the offices of an agricultural union, syndicalists called for a general strike. During the strike, Lisbon was controlled by workers and there were armed uprisings in several other cities. In 1912, the strike wave ebbed off. Italian syndicalists successfully organized agricultural workers in the Po Valley by uniting different parts of agricultural working class. They were most successful in areas where the reformist union Federterra had been thwarted by employers. Syndicalists led large strikes by farm workers in Parma and Ferrara in 1907–1908; these strikes failed as a result of employers' strikebreaking tactics and infighting among workers. In 1911–1913, syndicalists played an important role in a large strike wave in Italy's industrial centers. The syndicalist union confederation USI was formed in 1912 by veterans of both strike movements.

British Wobblies were involved in two major strikes in Scotland, one at Argyll Motor Works and the second at a Singer Corporation's sewing machine factory in Clydebank. In 1906, several industrial unionists began to spread their ideas and organize workers at Singer's. They organized the 1911 strike at Singer after a woman was fired for not working hard enough. The strike was cleverly defeated by management and most activists lost their jobs. The ISEL leader Tom Mann was also at the center of several labor disputes during the Great Labour Unrest, including the 1911 Liverpool general transport strike where he chaired the strike committee. In Ireland, Larkin and the ITGWU led 20,000 during the 1913 Dublin lockout. After the ITGWU attempted to unionize the Dublin United Tramway Company and tram workers went on strike, the city's employers threatened to fire any workers who did not sign a pledge to not support the ITGWU, thereby turning the dispute into a city-wide conflict in late September. Workers' resistance crumbled in January 1914.

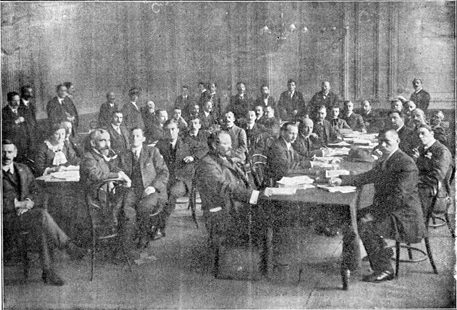
A session of the First International Syndicalist Congress in 1913

There was no international syndicalist organization prior to World War I. In 1907, CGT activists presented the Charter of Amiens and syndicalism to an international audience a higher form of anarchism at the International Anarchist Congress of Amsterdam in 1907. Discussions at the Congress led to the formation of the international syndicalist journal Bulletin international du mouvement syndicaliste. The CGT was affiliated with the International Secretariat of National Trade Union Centers (ISNTUC), which brought together reformist socialist unions. Both the Dutch NAS and the British ISEL attempted to remedy the lack of a syndicalist counterpart to ISNTUC in 1913, simultaneously publishing calls for an international syndicalist congress in 1913. The CGT rejected the invitation. Its leaders feared that leaving ISNTUC, which it intended to revolutionize from within, would split the CGT and harm working-class unity. The IWW also did not participate, as it considered itself an international in its own right. The First International Syndicalist Congress was held in London from 27 September to 2 October. It was attended by 38 delegates from 65 organizations in Argentina, Austria, Belgium, Brazil, Cuba, France, Germany, Italy, the Netherlands, Poland, Spain, Sweden, and the United Kingdom. (Note: The CGT's absence led the New Statesman to liken the Congress "to playing Hamlet without the Prince of Denmark".) Discussions were contentious and did not lead to the founding of a syndicalist international. Delegates did agree on a declaration of principles describing syndicalism's core tenets. They also decided to launch an International Syndicalist Information Bureau and to hold another congress in Amsterdam. This congress did not take place due to the outbreak of World War I.

=== World War I ===
Syndicalists had long opposed interventionism. Haywood held that "it is better to be a traitor to your country than to your class". French syndicalists viewed the French Army as the primary defender of the capitalist order. In 1901, the CGT published a manual for soldiers encouraging desertion. In 1911, British syndicalists distributed an "Open Letter to British Soldiers" imploring them not to shoot on striking workers but to join the working class's struggle against capital. Syndicalists argued that patriotism was a means of integrating workers into capitalist society by distracting them from their true class interest. In 1908, the CGT's congress invoked the slogan of the First International, proclaiming that the "workers have no fatherland".

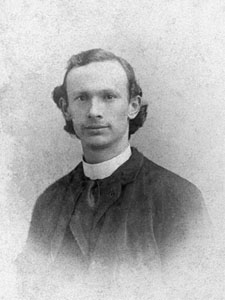
Christiaan Cornelissen, a Dutch anarcho-syndicalist who supported World War I

When World War I broke out in July 1914, socialist parties and trade unions – both in neutral and belligerent countries – supported their respective nations' war efforts or national defense, (Note: Russian, Serbian, and Italian socialists were the exception.) despite previous pledges to do the opposite. Socialists agreed to put aside class conflict and vote for war credits. German socialists argued that war was necessary to defend against what they termed Russia's "barbaric Tsarism", while their French counterparts pointed to the need to defend against Prussian militarism and the German "instinct of domination and of discipline". This collaboration between the socialist movement and the state was known as the union sacrée in France, the Burgfrieden in Germany, and godsvrede in the Netherlands. Moreover, a number of anarchists led by Peter Kropotkin, including the influential syndicalist Christiaan Cornelissen, issued the Manifesto of the Sixteen, supporting the Allied cause in the war. Despite this, most syndicalists remained true to their internationalist and anti-militarist principles by opposing the war and their respective nation's participation in it.

The majority of the French CGT and a sizable minority in the Italian USI did not. The CGT had long had a moderate, reformist wing, which gained the upper hand. As a result, according to historians like Darlington or van der Linden and Thorpe, the CGT was no longer a revolutionary syndicalist organization after the start of World War I. It followed the French president's call for national unity by agreeing to a no-strike pledge and to resolve labor disputes through arbitration and by actively participating in the French war effort. Most of its members of military age were conscripted without resistance and its ranks shrank from 350,000 in 1913 to 49,000 dues-paying members in 1915. CGT leaders defended this course by arguing that France's war against Germany was a war between democracy and republicanism on the one side and barbaric militarism on the other. Italy did not initially participate in World War I, which was deeply unpopular in the country, when it broke out. The Italian Socialist Party and the reformist Italian General Confederation of Labour opposed intervention in the Great War. Once Italy became a participant, the socialists refused to support the war effort but also refrained from working against it. From the start of the war, even before Italy did so, a minority within USI, led by the most famous Italian syndicalist, Alceste De Ambris, called on the Italian state to take the Allies' side. As part of left-interventionism, the pro-war syndicalists saw Italian participation in the war as the completion of nationhood. They also felt compelled to oppose the socialists' neutrality and therefore support the war. Finally, they gave similar arguments as the French, warning of the dangers posed by the "suffocating imperialism of Germany", and felt obliged to follow the CGT's lead.

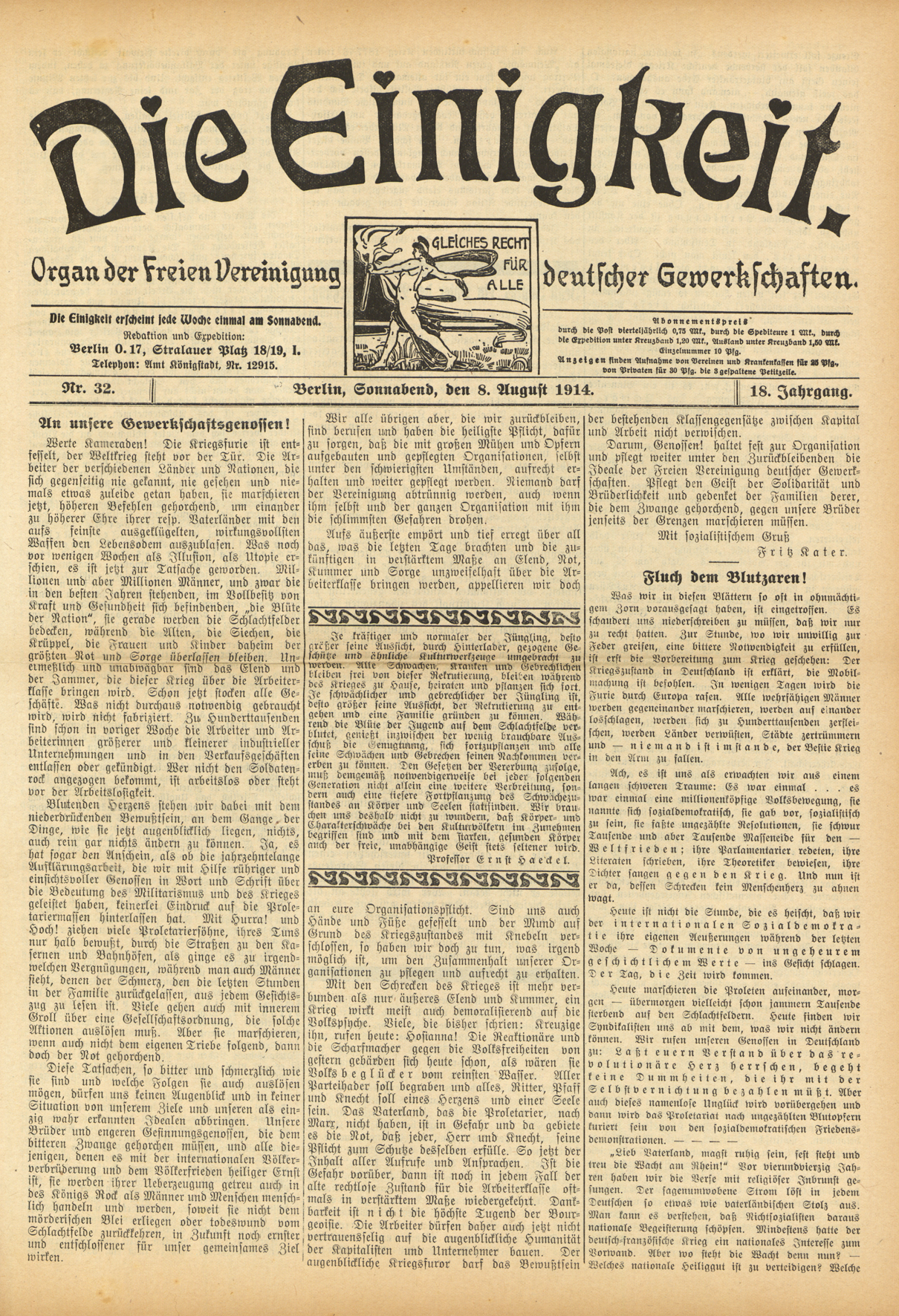
August 1914 edition of Die Einigkeit, a German syndicalist newspaper, protesting the outbreak of war

USI's pro-war wing had the support of less than a third of the organization's members and it was forced out in September 1914. Its anarchist wing, led by Borghi, was firmly opposed to the war, deeming it incompatible with workers' internationalism and predicting that it would only serve elites and governments. Its opposition was met with government repression, and Borghi and others were interned by the end of the war. Instead, the anti-war faction in the CGT was a small minority. It was led by the likes of Pierre Monatte and Alphonse Merrheim. They would link up with anti-war socialists from around Europe at the 1915 Zimmerwald Conference. They faced considerable difficulties putting up meaningful resistance against the war. The government called up militants to the Army, including Monatte, who considered refusing the order and being summarily executed; he decided this would be futile. Syndicalist organizations in other countries nearly unanimously opposed the war. In neutral Spain, José Negre of the CNT declared: "Let Germany win, let France win, it is all the same to the workers." The CNT insisted that syndicalists could support neither side in an imperialist conflict.

A wave of pro-British sentiment swept Ireland during the war, although the ITGWU and the rest of the Irish labor movement opposed it, and half of the ITGWU's membership enlisted in the British military. The ITGWU had also been significantly weakened in 1913 in the Dublin Lockout. After Larkin left Ireland in 1914, James Connolly took over leadership of the union. Because of the organization's weakness, Connolly allied it along with its paramilitary force, the Irish Citizen Army, with the Irish Republican Brotherhood. Together, they instigated the Easter Rising, seeking to weaken the British Empire and hoping that the insurrection would spread throughout Europe. The uprising was quickly quelled by the British army and Connolly was executed. In Germany, the small Free Association of German Trade Unions (FVdG) opposed the socialists' Burgfrieden and Germany's involvement in the war, challenging the claim that the country was waging a defensive war. Its journals were suppressed and a number of its members were arrested. The United States did not enter the war until the spring of 1917. The start of the war had induced an economic boom in the United States, tightening the labor market and thereby strengthening workers' bargaining position. The IWW profited from this, more than doubling its membership between 1916 and 1917. At the same time, the Wobblies fervently denounced the war and mulled calling an anti-war general strike. Once the United States became a combatant, the IWW maintained its anti-war stance, while its bitter rival, the AFL, supported the war; however, it did not launch an anti-war campaign, as it feared the government would crush it if it did, and wanted to focus on its economic struggles. The IWW's practical opposition to the war was limited, 95% of eligible IWW members registered for the draft, and most of those drafted served. Syndicalists in the Netherlands and Sweden, both neutral countries, criticized the truce socialists entered with their governments in order to shore up national defense. The Dutch NAS disowned Cornelissen, one of its founders, for his support for the war.

Syndicalists from Spain, Portugal, Great Britain, France, Brazil, Argentina, Italy, and Cuba met at an anti-war congress in Ferrol, Spain, in April 1915. Although the congress was poorly planned and prohibited by the Spanish authorities, delegates managed to discuss resistance to the war and extending international cooperation between syndicalist groups. Argentine, Brazilian, Spanish, and Portuguese delegates later met in October in Rio de Janeiro to continue discussions and resolved to deepen cooperation between South American syndicalists. While syndicalists were only able to put up a rather limited practical struggle against World War I, they also looked to challenge the war on an ideological or cultural level. They pointed to the horrors of war and spurned efforts to legitimate it as something noble. German syndicalists drew attention to the death, injury, destruction, and misery that the war wrought. German, Swedish, Dutch, and Spanish syndicalists denounced nationalism with Tierra y Libertad, a syndicalist journal in Barcelona, calling it a "grotesque mentality". The Dutch newspaper De Arbeid criticized nationalism, because "it finds its embodiment in the state and is the denial of class antagonism between the haves and the have-nots". German and Spanish syndicalists went further still by putting into question the concept of nationhood itself and dismissing it as a mere social construct. The Germans observed that most inhabitants of the German Empire identified not as Germans but in regional terms as Prussians or Bavarians and the like. Multilingual countries like Germany and Spain also could not claim a common language as a defining characteristic of the nation nor did members of the same nation share the same values or experiences, syndicalists in Spain and Germany argued. Syndicalists also argued against the notion that the war was a clash of different cultures or that it could be justified as a defense of civilization. They stated that various cultures were not mutually hostile, and the state should not be seen as the embodiment of culture, since culture was the product of the entire population, while the state acted in the interests of just a few. Moreover, they argued that if culture was to be understood as high culture, the very workers dying in the war were denied access to that culture by capitalist conditions. Finally, syndicalists railed against religious justifications for war. Before the war, they had rejected religion as divisive at best; support for the war by both Catholic and Protestant clergy revealed their hypocrisy and disgraced the principles they and Christianity claimed to uphold.

As the war progressed, disaffection with worsening living conditions at home and a growing numbers of casualties at the front eroded the enthusiasm and patriotism the outbreak of war had aroused. Prices were on the rise, food was scarce, and it became increasingly clear that the war would not be short. In Germany, food shortages led to demonstrations and riots in a number of cities in the summer of 1916. At the same time, anti-war demonstrations started. Strikes picked up from around 1916 or 1917 on across Europe and soldiers began to mutiny. Workers distrusted their socialist leaders who had joined the war effort. Thanks in part to their fidelity to internationalism, syndicalist organizations profited from this development and expanded as the war drew to an end.

=== Russian Revolution and post-war turmoil ===
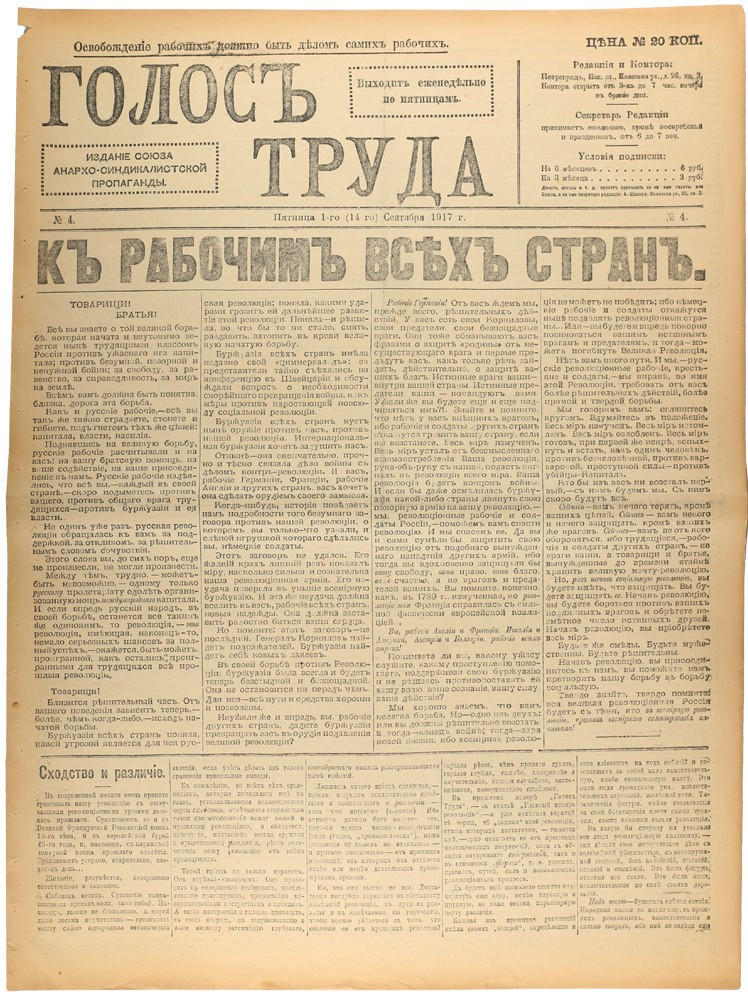
14 September 1917, issue of Golos Truda. The headline reads: "To the workers of all countries."

Disaffection with the war condensed in the post-World War I revolutions that began with the Russian Revolution of 1917. In February 1917, strikes, riots, and troop mutinies broke out in Petrograd, forcing the Nicholas II to abdicate on 2 March in favor of the Russian Provisional Government. Immediately, anarchist groups emerged. Russian syndicalists organized around the journal Golos Truda (The Voice of Labor), which had a circulation of around 25,000, and the Union of Anarcho-Syndicalist Propaganda. (Note: Most syndicalists were exiled to Western Europe or America before the revolution and started returning in the summer. The most prominent syndicalists who returned to Russia were Maksim Raevskii, Vladimir Shatov, Alexander Schapiro, a participant in the 1913 syndicalist congress in London, and Vseolod Mikhailovich Eikhenbaum, known as Volin. They were joined by the young local Grigorii Maksimov. In their New York exile, Raevskii, Shatov, and Volin had worked on the syndicalist journal Golos Truda, then the organ of the Union of Russian Workers. They brought it with them proceeded to publish in Petrograd looking to spread syndicalist ideas among workers by introducing them to French movement and the general strike. Outside of Petrograd, syndicalism also gained followers in Vyborg, Moscow, and in the south among the miners in the Donets Basin and cement workers and longshoremen in Ekaterinodar and Novorossiisk.) Anarchists found themselves agreeing with the Bolsheviks led by Lenin, who returned to Russia in April, as both sought to bring down the provisional government. Lenin abandoned the theory of historical trajectory, which represented the idea that capitalism is a necessary stage on Russia's path to communism, dismissed the establishment of a parliament in favor of that power being taken by soviets, and called for the abolition of the police, the army, the bureaucracy, and finally the state – all sentiments syndicalists shared. Although the syndicalists also welcomed the soviets, they were most enthusiastic about the factory committees and workers' councils that had emerged in all industrial centers in the course of strikes and demonstrations in the February Revolution. The committees fought for higher wages and shorter hours but above all for workers' control over production, which both the syndicalists and Bolsheviks supported. The syndicalists viewed the factory committees as the true form of syndicalist organization, not unions. (Note: Volin derided the unions, which were dominated by Mensheviks, as a "mediator between labor and capital" and as "reformist".) Because they were better organized, the Bolsheviks were able to gain more traction in the committees, with six times as many delegates in a typical factory. Despite the goals they had in common, syndicalists became anxious about the Bolsheviks' growing influence, especially after they won majorities in the Petrograd and Moscow soviets in September.

The Petrograd Soviet established the 66-member Petrograd Military Revolutionary Committee, which included four anarchists, among them the syndicalist Shatov. On 25 October, this committee led the October Revolution; (Note: Compared with the mass revolts in February, it was more of a coup d'état. According to its commander Leon Trotsky, no more than 30,000 participated.) after taking control of the Winter Palace and key points in the capital with little resistance, it proclaimed a Soviet government. Anarchists were jubilant at the toppling of the provisional government. They were concerned about the proclamation of a new government, fearing a dictatorship of the proletariat, even more so after the Bolsheviks created the central Soviet of People's Commissars composed only of members of their party. They called for decentralization of power but agreed with Lenin's labor program, which endorsed workers' control in all enterprises of a certain minimum size. The introduction of workers' control led to economic chaos. Lenin turned to restoring discipline in the factories and order to the economy in December by putting the economy under state control. At the First All Russian Congress of Trade Unions in January, the syndicalists, who had paid little attention to the unions, only had 6 delegates, while the Bolsheviks had 273. No longer depending on their help in toppling the provisional government, the Bolsheviks were now in a position to ignore the syndicalists' opposition and outvoted them at this congress. They opted to disempower local committees by subordinating them to the trade unions, which in turn became organs of the state. The Bolsheviks argued that workers' control did not mean that workers controlled factories at the local level and that this control had to be centralized and put under a broader economic plan. The syndicalists criticized the Bolshevik regime bitterly, characterizing it as state capitalist. They denounced state control over the factories and agitated for decentralization of power in politics and the economy, and syndicalization of industry. (Note: Golos Truda was suppressed and replaced with a new but short-lived journal, Vol'nyi Golos Truda (The Free Voice of Labor). A first All-Russian Conference of Anarcho-Syndicalists was held August 1918, followed by a second in November, which established the All-Russian Confederation of Anarcho-Syndicalists. There is no evidence this confederation was effective in coordinating syndicalist activities.) The Russian Civil War against the White Army split anarchists. The syndicalists were criticized harshly because most supported the Bolshevik regime in the war even as they excoriated Bolshevik policy. They reasoned that a White victory would be worse and that the Whites had to be defeated before a third revolution could topple the Bolsheviks. (Note: Schapiro served in the Commissariat of Foreign Affairs whilst remaining a committed syndicalist and moderate critic of the regime. Shatov fought in the Red Army and eventually abandoned syndicalism. A number of anarchists fell in the Russian Civil War.) Despite this, syndicalists were harassed and repeatedly arrested by the police, particularly the Cheka, from 1919 on. Their demands had some sway with workers and dissidents within the Bolshevik party and the Bolshevik leadership viewed them as the most dangerous part of the libertarian movement. After the Russian Civil War ended, workers and sailors, including both anarchists and Bolsheviks, rose up in what came to be known as the Kronstadt rebellion of 1921, with Kronstadt being a bastion of radicalism since 1905, against what they saw as the rule of a small number of bureaucrats. Anarchists hailed the rebellion as the start of the third revolution. The government reacted by having anarchists throughout the country arrested, including a number of syndicalist leaders. The Russian syndicalist movement was thereby defeated.

Syndicalists in the West who had opposed World War I reacted gushingly to the Russian Revolution. (Note: Pro-war syndicalists in the CGT instead viewed the revolution as treason because the Bolsheviks withdrew Russia from the war. De Ambris and the syndicalist supporters of war in Italy also denounced the upheaval as a challenge to nationalism.) Although they were still coming to grips with the evolving Bolshevik ideology and despite traditional anarchist suspicions of Marxism, they saw in Russia a revolution that had taken place against parliamentary politics and under the influence of workers' councils. At this point, they also had only limited knowledge of the reality in Russia. Augustin Souchy, a German anarcho-syndicalist, hailed it "the great passion that swept us all along. In the East, so we believed, the sun of freedom rose." The Spanish CNT declared: "Bolshevism is the name, but the idea is that of all revolutions: economic freedom. ... Bolshevism is the new life for which we struggle, it is freedom, harmony, justice, it is the life that we want and will enforce in the world." Borghi recalled: "We exulted in its victories. We trembled at its risks. ... We made a symbol and an altar of its name, its dead, its living and its heroes." He called on Italians to "do as they did in Russia". Indeed, a revolutionary wave, inspired in part by Russia, swept Europe in the following years.

In Germany, strikes and protests against food shortage, mainly by women, escalated and by 1917 had eroded public confidence in the government. The abdication of Wilhelm II in November 1918 after the Kiel mutiny by sailors sparked an insurrectionary movement throughout the country that led to the German Revolution of 1918–19. The syndicalist FVdG, which had just 6,000 members before the war and was almost completely suppressed by the state during the war, regrouped at a conference in Berlin in December 1918. It was active in the revolutionary events of the following years, particularly in the Ruhr area. It supported spontaneous strikes and championed direct action and sabotage. The FVdG started to be held in high regard for its radicalism by workers, particularly miners, who appreciated the syndicalists' ability to theorize their struggles and their experience with direct action methods. Starting in the second half of 1919, workers disappointed by the socialist party's and unions' support for the war and previously non-unionized unskilled workers who were radicalized during the war flocked to the FVdG. The revolution also saw the introduction to Germany of industrial unionism along the lines of the IWW with some support from the American organization but also with links to the left wing of the Communist Party of Germany. In December 1919, the Free Workers' Union of Germany (Syndicalists) (Freie Arbeiter-Union Deutschlands (Syndikalisten), FAUD) was formed, claiming to represent over 110,000 workers, more than eighteen times the FVdG's pre-war membership. Most of the new organization came from the FVdG, although industrial unionists, whose influence was dwindling, were also involved. Rudolf Rocker, an anarchist recently returned to Germany after spending several years in London, wrote the FAUD's program.

Class struggle peaked in Italy in the years 1919–1920, which became known as the biennio rosso or red biennium. Throughout this wave of labor radicalism, syndicalists, along with anarchists, formed the most consistently revolutionary faction on the left as socialists sought to rein in workers and prevent unrest. The Italian syndicalist movement had split during the war, as the syndicalist supporters of Italian intervention left USI. The interventionists, led by Alceste de Ambris and Edmondo Rossoni, formed the Italian Union of Labor (Unione Italiana del Lavoro, UIL) in 1918. The UIL's national syndicalism emphasized workers' love of labor, self-sacrifice, and the nation rather than anti-capitalist class struggle. Both USI and the UIL grew significantly during the biennio rosso. The first factory occupation of the biennio was carried out by the UIL at a steel plant in Dalmine in February 1919, before the military put an end to it. In July, a strike movement spread through Italy, culminating in a general strike on 20 July. While USI supported it and was convinced by the workers' enthusiasm that revolution could be possible, the UIL and the socialists were opposed. The socialists succeeded in curtailing the general strike and it imploded with a day. The government, unsettled by the radicalism on display, reacted with repression against the far left and concessions to workers and peasants.

In Portugal, working class unrest picked up from the start of the war. In 1917, radicals began to dominate the labor movement as a result of the war, the Sidónio Pais dictatorship established that year, and the influence of the Russian Revolution. The 1918 Portugal general strike was called for November but failed, and in 1919 the syndicalist General Confederation of Labour (Confederação Geral do Trabalho, CGT) was formed as the country's first national union confederation.

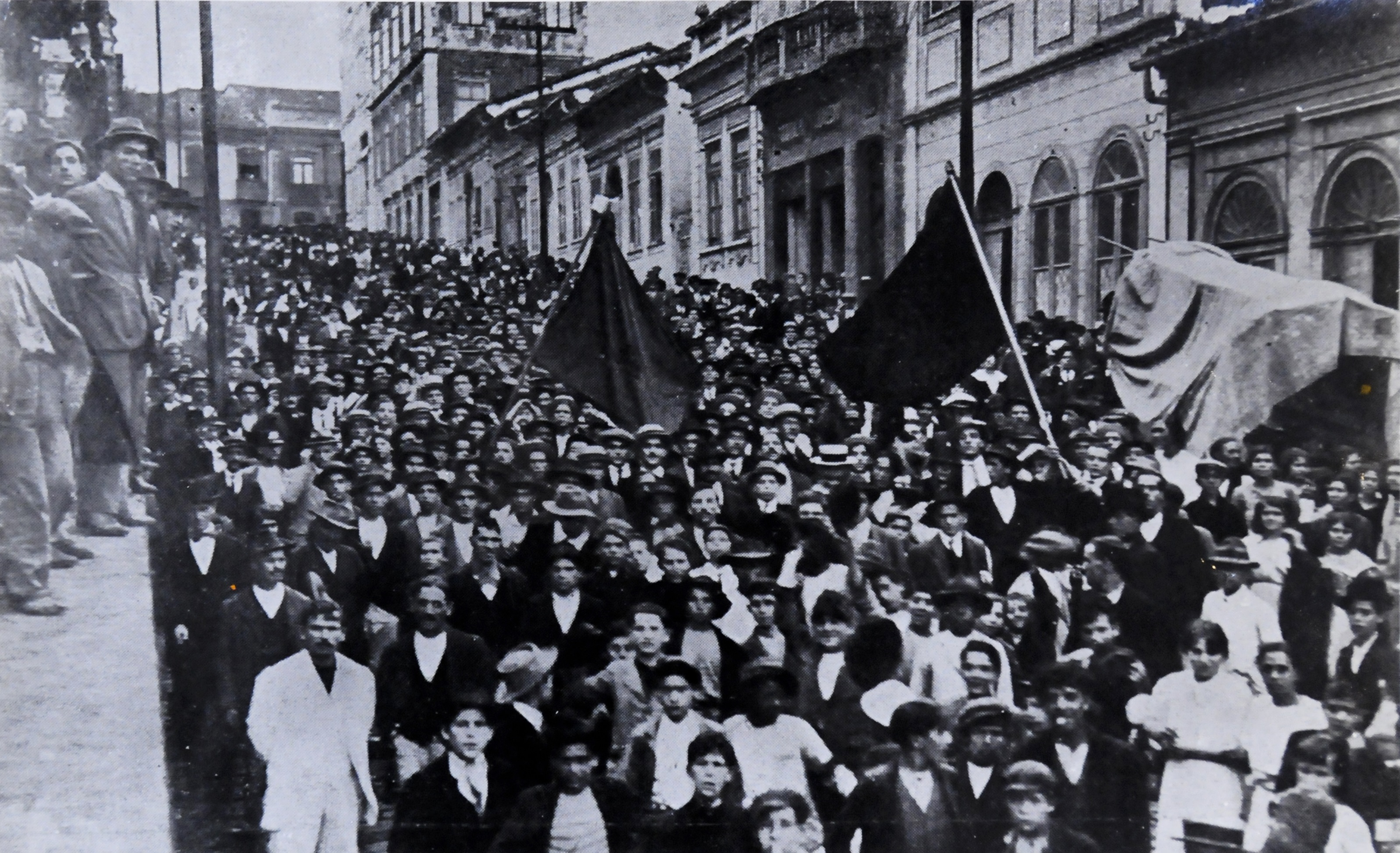
The 1917 Brazilian general strike in São Paulo

In Brazil, in both Rio de Janeiro and São Paulo, syndicalists, along with anarchists and socialists, were leaders in the 1917–1919 Brazil strike movement and cycle of labor struggles. It included a general strike in 1917, a failed uprising in 1918 inspired by the Russian Revolution, and a number of smaller strikes. The movement was put down by increased organization by employers to resist workers' demands and by government repression, including the closure of unions, arrests, deportations of foreign militants, and violence, with some 200 workers killed in São Paulo alone. In Argentina, FORA had split into the anarcho-communist FORA V and the syndicalist FORA IX. While FORA V called for a futile general strike in 1915, FORA IX was more careful. It called off general strikes it had planned in 1917 and 1918. In January 1919, five workers were by the authorities during a strike led by a union with tenuous links to FORA V. At the funeral, police killed another 39 workers. Both FORA organizations called for a general strike, which continued after FORA IX reached a settlement. Vigilantes, supported by business and the military, attacked unions and militants. In all, between 100 and 700 people died in what became known as the Tragic Week. Nevertheless, strikes continued to increase and both FORA V and IX grew.

The United States underwent an increase in labor militancy during the post-war period. 1919 saw the Seattle general strike, large miners' strikes, the Boston police strike, and the nationwide steel strike of 1919. The IWW had been nearly destroyed in the previous two years by local criminal syndicalism laws, the federal government, and vigilante violence. It attempted to take credit for some of the strikes, although in reality it was too weak to play a significant role. The First Red Scare intensified the attacks on the IWW; by the end of 1919, the IWW was practically powerless. 1919 also saw the Canadian labour revolt, leading to the formation of One Big Union, which was only partly industrial unionist.

=== International Workers' Association ===
The Bolsheviks suppressed syndicalism in Russia but courted syndicalists abroad as part of their international strategy. In March 1919, the 1st Congress of the Comintern was held in Moscow. The Bolsheviks acknowledged syndicalism's opposition to socialist reformism and saw them as part of the revolutionary wing of the labor movement. No syndicalists attended the founding convention, mainly because the Allied intervention in the Russian Civil War, which included a blockade of Russia by the Allied powers of World War I, made travel to Moscow near impossible. After long discussions, the CNT opted to join the Comintern, although it classified its adherence as provisional as a concession to detractors of Bolshevism. USI also decided to join; some like Borghi had reservations about the course of events in Russia. In France, the CGT's radical minority that had opposed the war enthusiastically supported Bolshevism. They formed the Revolutionary Syndicalist Committees and attempted to push the CGT as a whole to support the Comintern. The General Executive Board of the IWW decided join the Comintern, although this decision was never confirmed by a convention. German and Swedish syndicalists were more critical of Bolshevism from the start. Rocker declared already in August 1918 that the Bolshevik regime was "but a new system of tyranny".

Syndicalists became more estranged from the Comintern in 1920. The 2nd World Congress of the Comintern in the summer of 1920 was attended by numerous syndicalists. The Italian USI, the Spanish CNT, the British shop stewards, and the revolutionary minority of the CGT had official representatives, while others like John Reed of the American IWW, Augustin Souchy of the German FAUD, and Taro Yoshiharo, a Japanese Wobbly, attended in an unofficial capacity. This was the first major international gathering of syndicalists since the end of the war. Western syndicalists' knowledge of the facts on the ground in Russia was at this point rather limited. They thought of the soviets as organs of workers' control over production and the Bolsheviks depicted them as such. Syndicalists were not aware of the extent to which they were in reality subordinated to the communist party. Instead, the congress revealed the irreconcilable differences between the syndicalist and the Bolshevik approach. Before the congress, the Comintern's executive committee arranged discussions with syndicalists to challenge the reformist International Federation of Trade Unions (IFTU). A document proposed by Solomon Lozovsky derided the apolitical unions as "lackeys of imperialist capitalism" for their betrayal during the war, to which syndicalists replied that of the syndicalist unions this only applied to the CGT. Throughout the preliminary meetings, syndicalists clashed with other delegates on the questions of the dictatorship of the proletariat and the conquest of state power as well as on relations with communists and the Comintern. Eventually all syndicalists agreed to the formation of a council tasked with spreading revolutionizing the trade union movement. Disagreements continued at the congress itself.

== Decline ==
From the early 1920s, the traditional syndicalist movements in most countries began to wane; state repression played a role, although movements that were not suppressed also declined. According to van der Linden and Thorpe, syndicalist organizations saw themselves as having three options: they could stay true to their revolutionary principles and be marginalized, they could give up those principles in order to adapt to new conditions, or they could disband or merge into non-syndicalist organizations. (Note: The Swedish SAC initially chose the first option. As an increasing number of workers left to join the mainstream unions, it changed course and became increasingly reformist. In the 1930s, unemployment funds were set up in Sweden, managed by unions but with significant contributions from the state. The SAC initially refused to participate but the ensuing loss in membership forced the SAC to give in. SAC membership then started to slowly rise.) The Spanish Revolution of 1936 resulted in the widespread implementation of anarcho-syndicalist and more broadly socialist organizational principles throughout various portions of the country for two to three years, primarily Catalonia, Aragon, Andalusia, and parts of the Levante, with the main union organization of the Republican faction being the CNT. Much of Spain's economy was put under workers' control before the Nationalist faction won the civil war and suppressed them. By the end of the 1930s, meaningful legal syndicalist organizations existed only in Bolivia, Chile, Sweden and Uruguay. Syndicalists were involved in the anti-fascist movements of resistance during World War II in several countries, including Germany, (Note: In Germany, the FAUD had already been reduced to a small organization, with a membership of just over 4,000 in 1932. Augustin Souchy had urged his comrades to prepare for illegality and the FAUD congress in 1932 had made plans for this. When the Nazis took power in January 1933, most local groups preemptively dissolved and hid their money and other resources to use them in their illegal work. On 9 March 1933, shortly after the Reichstag fire, the FAUD's headquarters in Berlin were searched by the police and ten people were arrested. As the SS and SA rounded up opponents of Nazism, many syndicalists were put in prisons, concentration camps, and torture chambers. Syndicalists distributed a number of newspapers, pamphlets, and leaflets, some smuggled from the Netherlands and Czechoslovakia, some printed in Germany. They passed information on the situation in Germany to their fellow syndicalists abroad. They organized clandestine meetings to coordinate their activities and build an underground resistance network. Illegal syndicalist activity peaked in 1934; by late 1934, the Gestapo started to infiltrate the underground organization and another round of arrests began. Although the start of the Spanish Civil War in 1936 briefly revitalized syndicalist activity, the syndicalist network was ultimately crushed by the Gestapo by 1937 or 1938. Most syndicalists who had not been arrested gave up at this point. Several dozen German syndicalists went into exile and some ended up in Barcelona, working for the CNT and fighting in the Spanish Civil War.) France, (Note: In France, many syndicalists were involved in the French Resistance. For instance, Georges Gourdin, an activist in the CGT's Technicians' Federation, organized links between other syndicalists and anarchists, and aided them and other refugees in escaping the Gestapo. He was arrested by the Gestapo in 1944, tortured without giving up any information, and died at a camp near Nordhausen, Thuringia. Another of the best known French resisters was Jean-René Saulière, who organized a resistance group that included the exiled Russian syndicalist Volin. The same day Toulouse was liberated in August 1944, a leaflet titled Manifesto of the Anarcho-Syndicalist Libertarian Groups was distributed by Saulière's network throughout the city.) and Poland. (Note: In Poland, syndicalists were among the first to organize the Polish resistance movement in World War II against Nazism. In October 1939, they formed the Union of Polish Syndicalists (ZSP) with 2,000 to 4,000 members. It published newspapers but also had fighting units in the resistance. In 1942, it joined the Home Army (AK) led by the Polish government-in-exile. Syndicalists also formed the Syndicalist Organization "Freedom" (SOW), which comprised several hundred activists and also had combatant units. The ZSP and the SOW were involved in the Warsaw Uprising of 1944. They formed the 104th Company of Syndicalists, a military unit consisting of several hundred soldiers who wore red and black bands, and hung red and black flags on the building they captured.)

Syndicalism's decline was the result of a number of factors. In Russia, Italy, Portugal, Germany, Spain, and the Netherlands, syndicalist movements were suppressed by authoritarian governments. The IWW in the United States and the Mexican House of the World Worker were weakened considerably by state repression. Syndicalist movements that were not suppressed also declined. According to van der Linden and Thorpe, this was primarily the result of the integration of the working class into capitalist relations. Proletarian families became units of individualized consumption as standards of living increased. This was partly the result of state intervention, particularly the emergence of the welfare state. Avenues for social reform opened up and the franchise was widened, giving parliamentary reformism legitimacy. Altena agrees that the state's growing influence in society was decisive for syndicalism's diminished influence. In addition to the welfare state, he refers to the increased significance of national policies, which eroded local autonomy. This made centralized unions able to negotiate national agreements more important and national and parliamentary politics more enticing for workers. They therefore turned to social democracy in larger numbers. Additionally, Altena says that syndicalism lost out to sports and entertainment in the cultural sphere.

Vadim Damier adds to this that the development of capitalist production and changes in the division of labor diminished syndicalism's recruitment base. According to authors like Stearns, Edward Shorter, Charles Tilly, and Bob Holton, who deem syndicalism a transitional form of workers' resistance between older craft-based artisanship and modern factory-based industry, syndicalism's decline was a product of that transition having been completed and workers being assimilated to capitalist factory discipline. Darlington counters that syndicalism attracted a variety of workers, not just artisans and skilled workers; he concedes that such changes played a role in Spain, France, and some other countries.

Several authors argue that syndicalism's demise was the result of workers' inherent pragmatism or conservatism, causing them to only be interested in immediate material gains rather than long-term goals like overthrowing capitalism. Robert Hoxie, Selig Perlman, and Patrick Renshaw invoke this argument to explain the IWW's decline, while Stearns, Dermot Keogh, and G. D. H. Cole do so with respect to French, Irish, and British syndicalism, respectively. Darlington disputes the assumption that workers are incapable of developing a revolutionary consciousness. He says that seeking material gains is not incompatible with developing class consciousness, which entails the awareness that workers' material interests conflict with capitalism, particularly in times of crisis.

According to many Marxists, syndicalism was a reaction to reformism in the labor movement and could not survive without it. The collapse of reformism after the war therefore automatically weakened syndicalism. According to Eric Hobsbawm, the biggest reason for syndicalism's decline was the rise of communism. Several communist parties drew their cadres from the syndicalists' ranks. To radical workers, the programmatic distinctions between syndicalism and communism were not all that relevant. The key is that, after the war, communism represented militancy or revolutionary attitude as such. Darlington also sees the effects of the Russian Revolution as an important reason for the decline of syndicalism. Darlington argues that the emergence of communism highlighted syndicalism's inherent weaknesses: the contradiction of building organizations that sought to be both revolutionary cadre organizations and mass labour unions, the emphasis on economic struggle to the detriment of political action and the commitment to localism limiting its ability to provide an effective centralized organization and leadership. Darlington claims the Bolsheviks overcame these limitations and its success in Russia drew syndicalist leaders and members. It also exacerbated splits within the syndicalist camp.

== Legacy ==
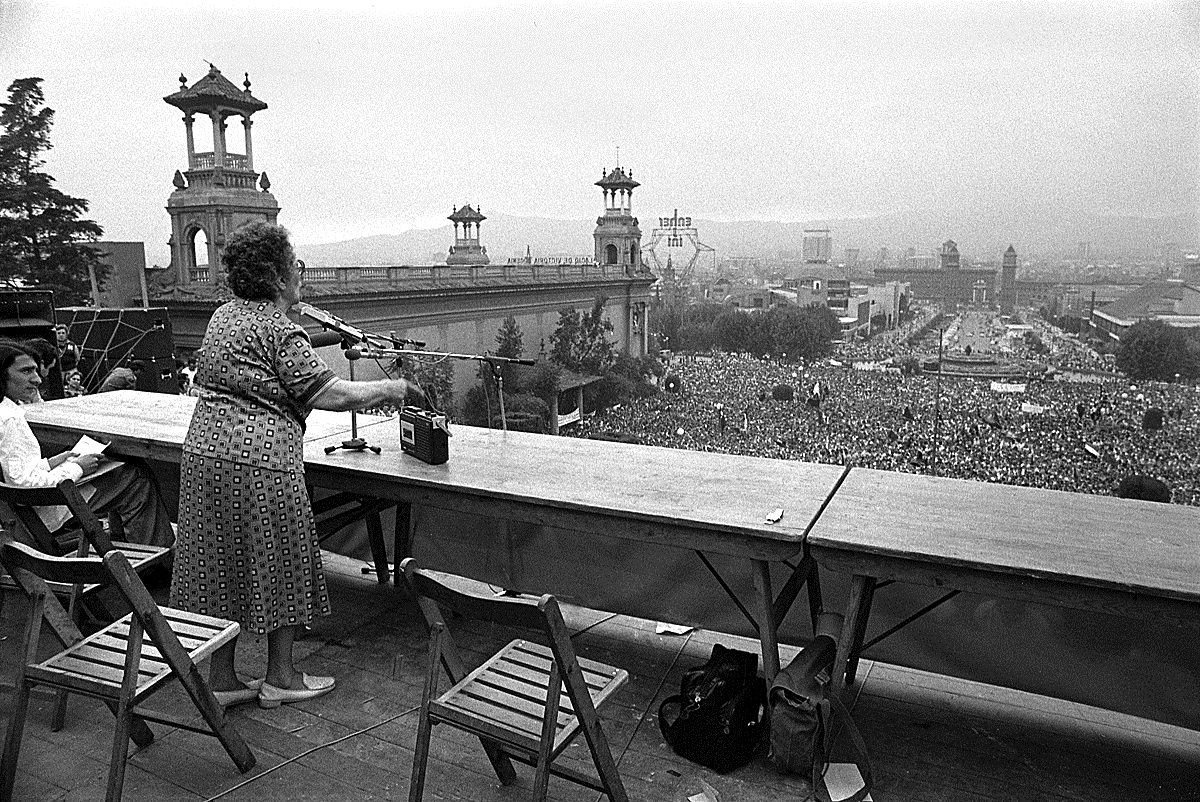
The Spanish anarchist Federica Montseny addressing a CNT meeting in Barcelona in 1977 attended by about 300,000 people

The Nationalist faction victory in the Spanish Civil War put an end to syndicalism as a mass movement. Immediately after World War II, there were attempts to rekindle anarcho-syndicalism in Germany; these were thwarted by Cold War anti-communism, Stalinism, and a failure to attract newer younger activists. Syndicalists maintained some influence in Latin American labor movements into the 1970s. The protest movements of the late 1960s saw renewed interest in syndicalism by activists in Germany, the United States, and Britain. During its Hot Autumn of 1969, Italy experienced labor actions reminiscent of syndicalism; according to Carl Levy, syndicalists did not actually exert any influence. During the 1980s in the Polish People's Republic, the trade union Solidarity (Solidarność), even though not strictly syndicalist, attracted masses of dissident workers by reviving many syndicalist ideas and practices. European anarcho-syndicalist unions declined after World War II. The Swedish SAC Syndikalisterna remained one of the few active IWA affiliates.

The IWA exists to this day, albeit with very little influence. At most, it is a "flicker of history, the custodian of doctrine" according to Wayne Thorpe. Among its member organizations is the British Solidarity Federation, which was formed in 1950, originally named the Syndicalist Workers' Federation. The German Free Workers' Union (Freie Arbeiterinnen- und Arbeiter-Union, FAU) was formed to carry on the FAUD's tradition in 1977; it has a membership of just 350 as of 2011. It left the IWA in 2018 to form the International Confederation of Labor (ICL). Spain has several syndicalist federations, including the CNT, which has around 50,000 members as of 2018. It, too, was a member of the IWA until 2018, when it joined the FAU in forming the ICL. After being defeated in the civil war, tens of thousands of CNT militants went into exile, mostly in France. In exile, the organization atrophied, with just 5,000 mostly older members by 1960. During the Spanish transition to democracy, the CNT was revived with a peak membership of over 300,000 in 1978; however, it was soon weakened, first by accusations of having been involved in the Scala affair (bombing of a nightclub), then by a schism. Members who favored participation in state-sponsored union elections left and formed an organization they would eventually name the General Confederation of Labor (Confederación General del Trabajo, CGT). Despite these concessions, the CGT still views itself as an anarcho-syndicalist organization and has around 100,000 members as of 2018.

According to Darlington, syndicalism left a legacy that was widely admired by labor and political activists in a number of countries. For example, the IWW song "Solidarity Forever" became part of the American labor movement's canon. The strike wave, including the recruitment of unskilled and foreign-born workers by the Congress of Industrial Organizations, that swept the United States in the 1930s followed in the IWW's footsteps. The tactic of the sit-down strike, made famous by the United Auto Workers in the Flint sit-down strike, was pioneered by Wobblies in 1906.

In his study of French syndicalism, Stearns concluded that it was a dismal failure. He argues that the radicalism of syndicalist labor leaders shocked French workers and the government, and thereby weakened the labor movement as a whole. Syndicalism was most popular among workers not yet fully integrated into modern capitalist industry but most French workers had adapted to this system and accepted it, therefore it was not able to seriously challenge prevailing conditions or even scare politicians and employers.

== See also ==
- Autonomism – Left-wing political and social movement
- Community unionism – Formation of alliances between unions and non-labour groups
- Council communism – Form of Left-Communism
- Guild socialism – Political labor movement
- List of syndicalists
- National syndicalism – Far-right adaptation of syndicalism
- Sorelianism – Advocacy for the ideas of Georges Sorel
- Workerism – Italian Marxist tendency
- Workplace democracy – Application of democratic principles to places of work
- Kaiserreich (video game) – Hearts of Iron IV mod (Alternative History scenario where syndicalism plays a major role)
