= Young Socialists (Sweden) =

Young Socialists Ungsocialisterna
- Abbreviation: UP
- Founders: Carl G. Schröder; Hinke Bergegren
- Founded: August 25, 1908
- Dissolved: c. 1968
- Split from: Swedish Social Democratic Party
- Newspaper: Brand
- Ideology: Revolutionary socialism Anarchism; Syndicalism
- Political position: Far-left

The Young Socialists (Swedish: Ungsocialisterna) was the name of the anarchist and socialist organization that can be said to be responsible for the break, which took place in 1908, between Swedish anarchism and social democracy. It was, among other things, these Young Socialists who took care of the magazine Brand. The Young Socialists were, among other things, behind the formation of the Central Organisation of the Workers of Sweden (Swedish: Sveriges Arbetares Centralorganisation, SAC) and the Young Socialist Party (Swedish: Ungsocialistiska Partiet, UP). The organization existed until the end of the 1960s, then under the name of the Anarchist Federation.

== History ==
The Swedish Social Democratic Party (Swedish: Sveriges Socialdemokratiska Arbetareparti, SAP) was founded in 1889, and in 1897 its youth union, the Swedish Socialist Youth Union (Swedish: Svenska Socialistiska Ungdomsförbunde, SSU), was formed, which at that time called itself the Young Socialists. The first congress in 1899 was attended by 15 delegates from 8 clubs in the cities of Stockholm, Gothenburg, Eskilstuna, Västerås, Malmö and Gävle.

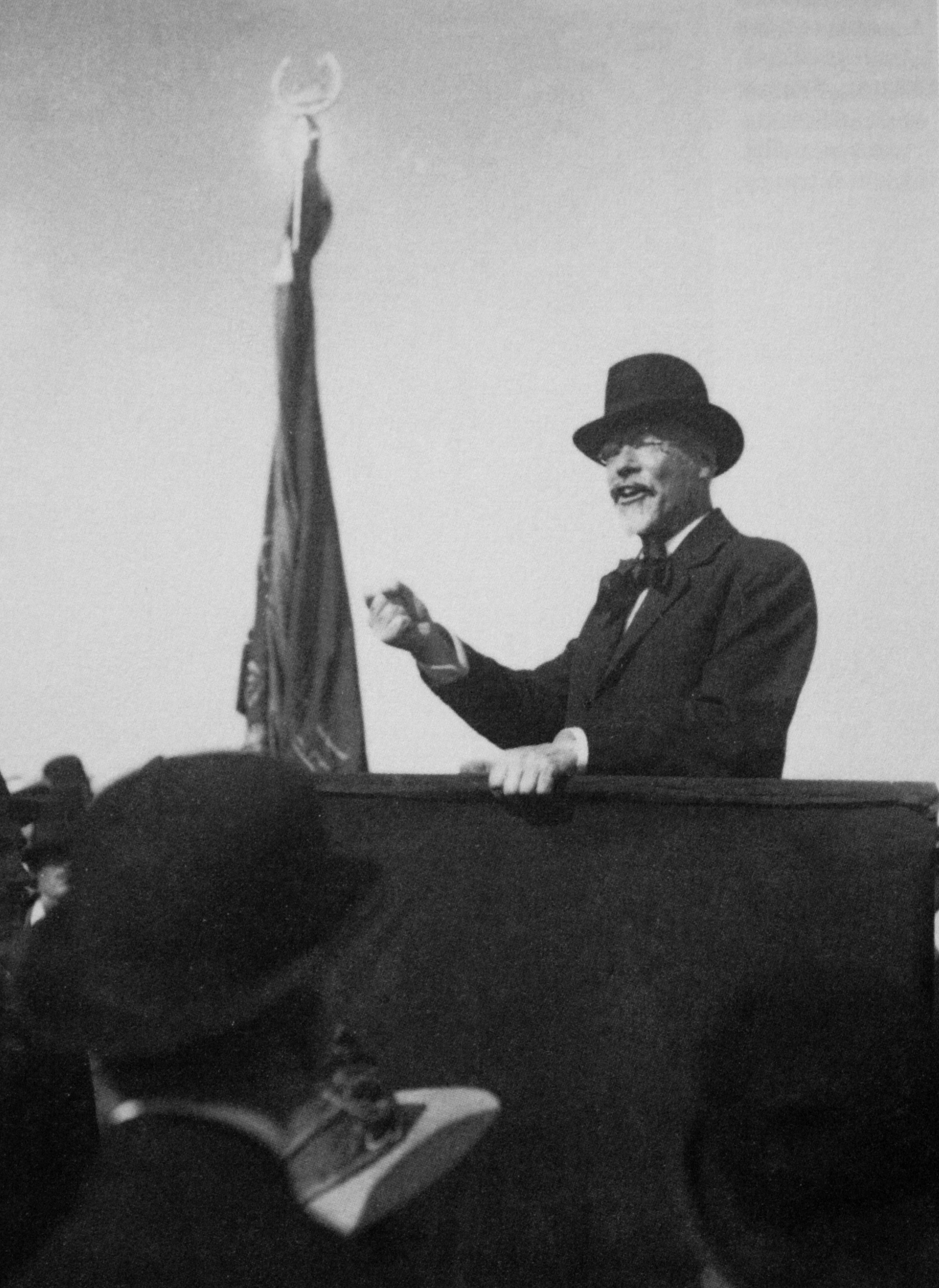
Hinke Bergegren speaking from a podium.

In contrast to the mother party, the Young Socialists moved quickly in a revolutionary direction. There was still no consensus within the Social Democrats as to whether to move in a reformist or revolutionary direction. Early on, the party leadership began to isolate the youth organization. A new organization was formed, the Social Democratic Youth League (Swedish: Socialdemokratiska Ungdomsförbundet, SU) by the Malmö Club, (which was the organization's largest club) and two adjoining clubs in Sofielund and Svedala at a conference in 1903 adopted the party's program in its entirety and a strong anti-militarist stance. In 1905, the SU was adopted as the party's new youth wing, and after that the Young Socialists were isolated. Two leading figures in the organization, Carl G. Schröder and Hinke Bergegren, were excluded in 1908 and the divorce became inevitable thereafter. The whole organization followed and at an extraordinary congress on 23-25 August it was decided to form a new party, the Young Socialist Party (Swedish: Ungsocialistiska Partiet, UP).

The Young Socialists soon became a large popular movement with 378 local branches across the country. The Young Socialists helped to spread the socialist ideas through, among others, the newspapers Brand and Lysekils-Kuriren. The magazine Brand presented various socialist ideologies, such as syndicalism, anarchism, Marxism and similar schools of thought. However, it is difficult to determine whether they would have advocated any of these socialist orientations. The Young Socialists were also not stuck in any direct ideology, even though their anarchist tendencies were strong.

There is a general description of events that "the Young Socialists started the SAC". The statement is not directly incorrect, but the process is not that simple either. In the plans for the formation of the SAC, many within the Young Socialists were hesitant. Among other things, they did not want to give rise to a division of the Swedish trade union movement, and many of the Young Socialists were active in Swedish Trade Union Confederation at the time. The organization was thus divided on the issue of SAC's formation. With the failed Great Strike of 1909, it was finally decided to form a new union. The Skåne department with the so-called Lund Committee, which included the young socialist Gustav Sjöström, became a driving force in the issue and in 1910 the Central Organisation of the Workers of Sweden (Swedish: Sveriges Arbetares Centralorganisation, SAC) was formed.

At the congress in 1923, it was decided to return to the previous organization's designation and the association's name was established to the Swedish Young Socialist League (Swedish: Sveriges Ungsocialistiska Förbund, SUF). The Congress of 1934 again decided on a name change, this time to the Anarchist Propaganda Association (Swedish: Anarkistiska Propagandaförbundet, AP). In 1965, the organization changed its name again, now to the Anarchist Federation (Swedish: Anarkistiska Federatione, AF). In the late 1960s, the organization was finally disbanded.

== Notable members ==
- John Andersson
- Hinke Bergegren
- Ragnar Casparsson
- Maj Hirdman
- Hilma Hofstedt
- Axel Holmström
- Albert Jensen
- Leon Larsson
- Anton Nilson
- Carl G. Schröder
- Gustav Sjöström

== See also ==
- Amalthea bombing

== Bibliography ==
- Bergegren, Hinke (1917). Ungsocialismen: historik (in Swedish). Stockholm: Ungsocialistiska partiets förl. OCLC 915174581. SELIBR 1220789.
- Björklund, C.J. (1966). "Ungsocialismens skriftverksamhet". Årsboken (in Swedish). Stockholm: Arbetarnas kulturhistoriska sällskap. OCLC 476553122.
- Fernström, Karl (1950). Ungsocialismen - En krönika (in Swedish). Stockholm: Federativs Förlag. OCLC 463179905. SELIBR 624286.
- Hjort, Magnus (2002). Hotet från vänster: Säkerhetstjänsternas övervakning av kommunister, anarkister m.m. 1965-2002 (in Swedish). Stockholm: Fritzes Offentliga Publikationer. ISBN 9138217724. OCLC 163099523.
