= Britta Gröndahl =

Swedish writer, journalist and translator

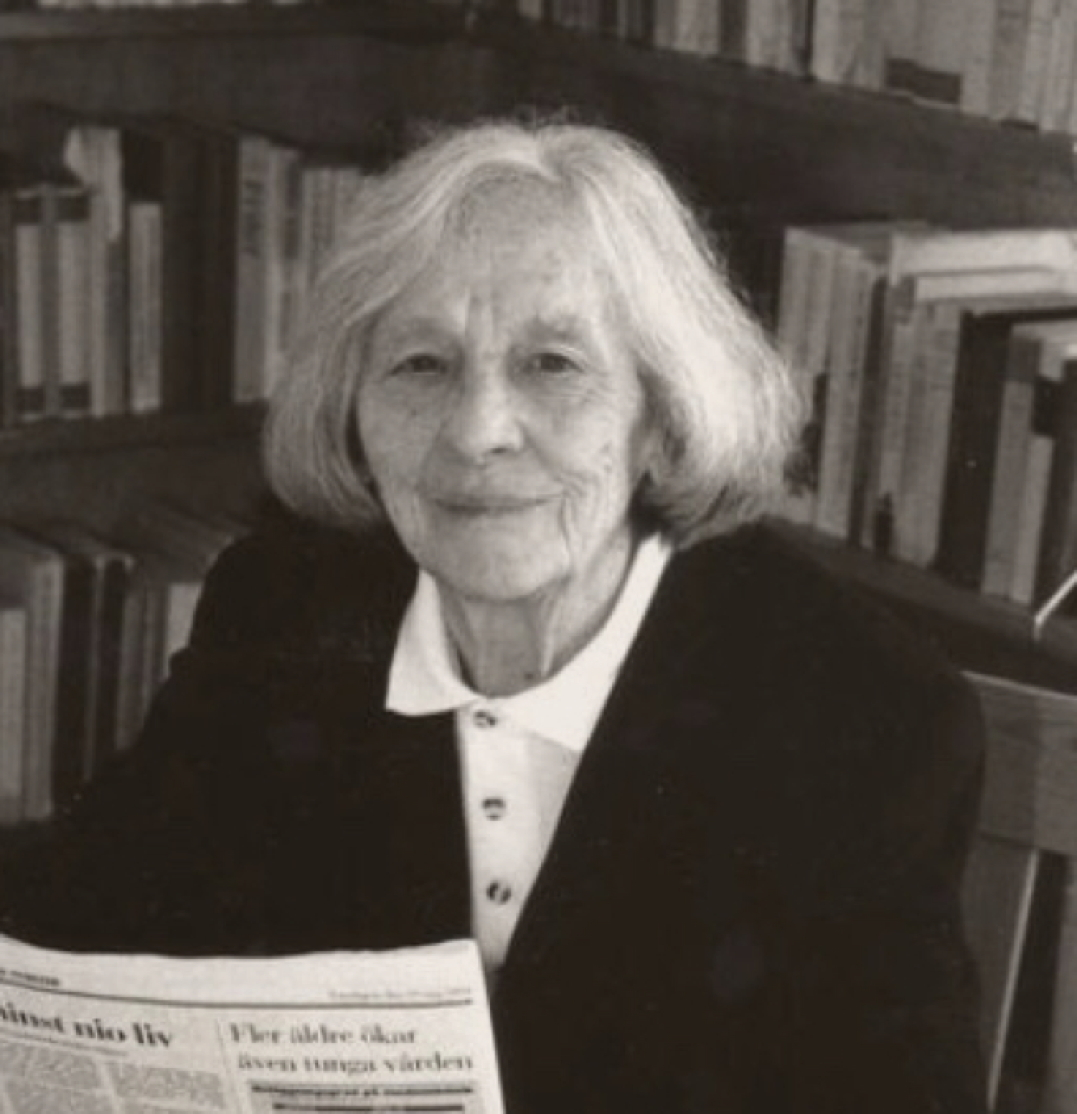
- Born: Britta Maartman; 8 March 1914; Eskilstuna, Sweden
- Died: 18 November 2002 (aged 88); Stockholm, Sweden
- Resting place: Bromma Cemetery
- Occupations: Translator, journalist
- Organization: Central Organisation of Swedish Workers
- Movement: Anarchism in Sweden

Britta Gröndahl (née Maartman; 1914–2002) was a Swedish writer, journalist, translator, and anarcho-syndicalist activist.

== Biography ==
Britta Maartman was born on 8 March 1914, in Eskilstuna. She was the daughter of Hans Maartman, a right-wing councillor for the Eskilstuna Municipality, and Dagmar Tideman. Despite their social status, the family found it difficult to sustain a middle class lifestyle, which made Britta familiar with class stratification from an early age. She graduated from secondary school in 1931, and soon after she met and married the musician Gustav Gröndahl. They moved to Stockholm, where Britta began learning languages at the university; despite being inclined towards political science, the subject was considered inappropriate for women at that time.

During the 1940s, she gave birth to three daughters (Birgitta, Ulla and Anna) and lived the life of a housewife, while also working a job and continuing her linguistics studies. She also published a series of Swedish translations of works in the Dutch and English languages, beginning with her translation of Clyde Brion Davis' novel The Anointed in 1945. By 1953, she had graduated with a licentiate in literature.

After her children came of age, Gröndahl moved into political activism. Under the influence of the German syndicalist Helmut Rüdiger, she joined the Central Organisation of Swedish Workers (SAC) and began writing for its newspaper Arbetaren. She became interested in the French and Spanish anarchist movements, and in 1959, she published a book about Pierre-Joseph Proudhon. In 1965, Gröndahl was appointed as the first international secretary of the SAC. Gröndahl was radicalised by the protests of 1968, prompting her to resign from her posts at Arbetaren and the SAC, which had become too moderate for her. She instead became involved with the anarchist youth movement, establishing a coffeehouse on Bellmansgatan and joining the team behind the libertarian socialist journal Frihetlig socialistisk tidskrift.

She continued to work as a translator, moving into publishing Swedish translations of French language works. In 1978, she published a translation of Marie Cardinal's novel The Words to Say It and cartoons by Claire Bretécher. During the 1980s, Gröndahl published a series of translations of the works of Michel Foucault, most notably including his four-volume opus The History of Sexuality. Towards the end of her life, in 1994, she published her memoirs. She died on 18 November 2002 and was buried in the graveyard of Bromma Church.

== Works ==
- Här talar syndikalisterna (1973)
- Parti eller fackförening? (1975)
- De ideologisk motsättningarna i den spanska syndikalismen 1910-36|De ideologiska motsättningarna i den spanska syndikalismen 1910-36 (1981)
- Herre i eget hus - om självförvaltning i Spanien och Portugal (1982)
- Frihetlig kommunism i praktiken (1986)
- Pierre-Joseph Proudhon: socialist, anarkist, federalist (1988)
- Äventyrens år (1994)

== Bibliography ==
- Holgersson, Ulrika (8 March 2018). "Britta Gröndahl". Svenskt kvinnobiografiskt lexikon. Translated by Grosjean, Alexia.
