= Anarchism in Sweden =

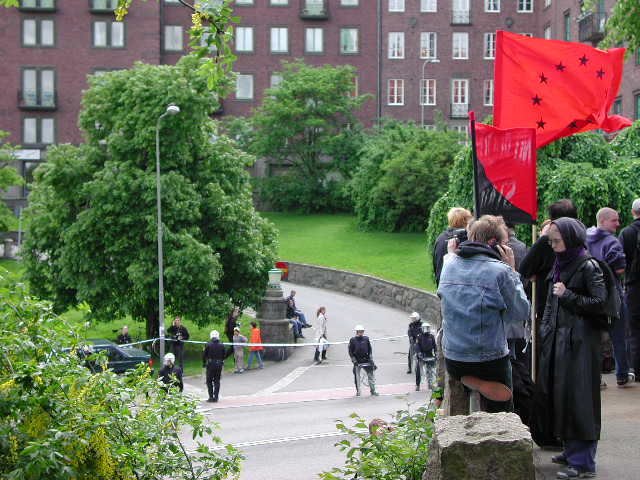
Anarchists besieged by police during the 2001 Gothenburg EU summit

Anarchism in Sweden first grew out of the nascent social democratic movement during the later 19th century, with a specifically libertarian socialist tendency emerging from a split in the movement. As with the movements in Germany and the Netherlands, Swedish anarchism had a strong syndicalist tendency, which culminated in the establishment of the Central Organisation of the Workers of Sweden (SAC) following an aborted general strike. The modern movement emerged during the late 20th century, growing within a number of countercultural movements before the revival of anarcho-syndicalism during the 1990s.

== History and influence ==
Anarchism was reported to have been extant in Sweden by Mikhail Bakunin as early as 1866.

Anarchist ideas were prominent in the Swedish Social Democratic Party (SAP) from its founding in 1889 to the early 1900s, with a number of anarchists including Hinke Bergegren becoming leading members. After the exclusion of Bergegren and other anarchists from the SAP in 1908, the party's youth organization – the Young Socialists (Swedish: Ungsocialisterna) – broke away to form a separate anti-parliamentary socialist party.

Following the defeat of the Great Strike of 1909, a number of Young Socialists participated in the foundation of an anarcho-syndicalist trade union, the Sveriges Arbetares Centralorganisation (SAC). During World War I, the SAC received support from the German syndicalist Augustin Souchy, while in the United States, the Swedish labor organizer Joe Hill was executed. The rise of anarcho-syndicalism influenced the magazine Brand, which had been published since 1898, to turn towards anarchism during the 1910s, going on to become the oldest continuously published anarchist magazine in Sweden.

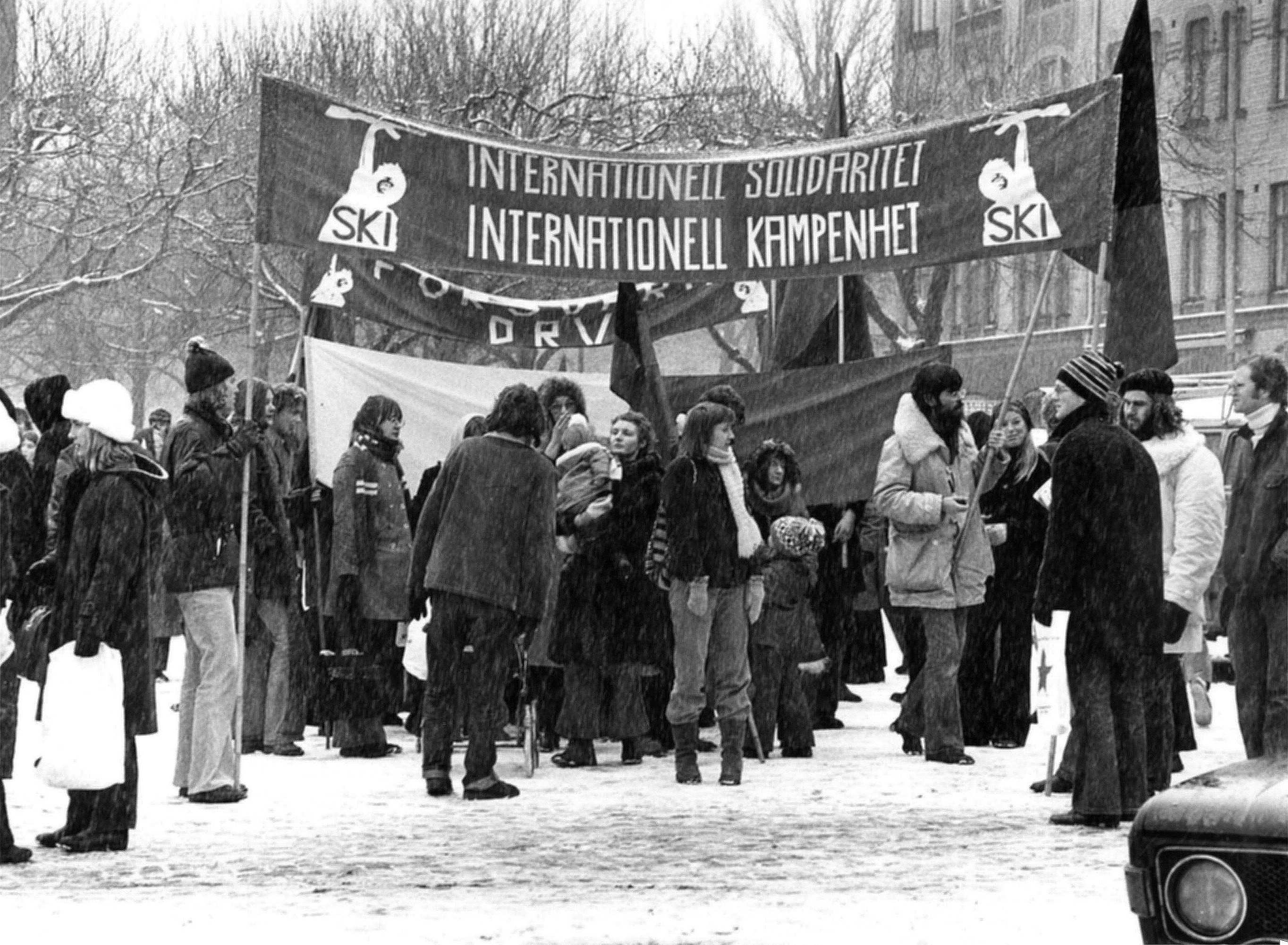
Anti-war demonstration by the Lund's Anarchist Group in the late 1960s.

The Swedish anarchist movement experienced a resurgence as a result of the protests of 1968, although by this time the Young Socialist Party had ceased to exist. Further attempts to rekindle a national organisation were largely short-lived, with anarchist presence instead taking root in the rising counterculture of the 1970s, particularly within the punk subculture and nascent intentional communities. By the 1980s, Swedish anarchists had come under the influence of the German autonomist movement, with a number of squats being established throughout the country, and by the following decade, green anarchism was embraced by an increasing number of Swedish anarchists.

Following the revolutions of 1989, Swedish interest in anarcho-syndicalism was revived. The SAC had continued its activities and grew to over 6,500 members, remaining active in labor organizing up until the modern day. In 1993, the Swedish Anarcho-syndicalist Youth Federation (SUF) was established as a youth organization in collaboration with the SAC.

One of many minor anarchist groups are the Fag Army, a left-wing queer anarchist group, which launched its first action on August 18, 2014, when it pied the Minister for Health and Social Affairs, Christian Democrat leader Göran Hägglund.

== Organizations ==
- Young Socialists (1908–1968)
- Central Organisation of the Workers of Sweden (1910–present)
- Syndicalist Workers Federation (1928–1938)
- Lund's Anarchist Group (1969–1973)
- Swedish Anarcho-syndicalist Youth Federation (1993–present)

== See also ==
- Category:Swedish anarchists
- List of anarchist movements by region
- Murder of Björn Söderberg
- Anarchism in Denmark
- Anarchism in Finland
- Anarchism in Norway

== Bibliography ==
- Campbell, Joan (1992). European Labor Unions. Westport: Greenwood Press. ISBN 0-313-26371-X.
- Kuhn, Gabriel (2009). "Anarchism, Sweden". In Ness, Immanuel (ed.). The International Encyclopedia of Revolution and Protest. pp. 1–2. doi:10.1002/9781405198073.wbierp0074. ISBN 9781405198073. OCLC 8682127155.
- Woodcock, George (2004). Anarchism: A History of Libertarian Ideas and Movements. Peterborough: Broadview Press. ISBN 1-55111-629-4.
