= Hampus Hellekant =

Swedish neo-Nazi convicted of murder

- Born: 30 January 1976 (age 50); Danderyd, Sweden
- Other names: Sätramördaren ("the Sätra murderer"); Karl Svensson
- Status: Released on probation
- Conviction: Murder of Björn Söderberg
- Criminal charges: Murder, accessory to murder
- Penalty: 11 years at Hall Prison

Karl Helge Hampus Hellekant, later Karl Svensson (born 30 January 1976), is a Swedish neo-Nazi who was sentenced to 11 years in prison for the murder of syndicalist union member Björn Söderberg on 12 October 1999. Shortly before the murder, Hellekant and some of his friends created "death lists" of more than 1200 Swedish individuals they wanted dead. Because of the content of the lists, his friends were also sentenced and the murder was declared a hate crime. Hellekant's efforts to become a physician, and his eventual dismissal from medical school at Karolinska Institute, became a controversial case in medical ethics.

== Murder of Björn Söderberg ==
On 16 September 1999, the syndicalist newspaper Arbetaren revealed that Robert Vesterlund, a prominent figure in the Swedish neo-Nazi movement, held a chair in the board of the local chapter of the Swedish Commercial Employees' Union at a Svanströms warehouse in Stockholm. Arbetaren had received the information from a co-worker of Vesterlund, the syndicalist union member Björn Söderberg. A week later, Vesterlund was expelled from his union, and quit his job.

Because of this, Hellekant and two friends, Björn Lindberg-Hernlund and Jimmy Niklasson, came to Söderberg's home in Sätra on 12 October. Hellekant has admitted that he, ordered by another person, called Söderberg a few hours earlier. A brawl ensued, and a few minutes later, Söderberg had been shot multiple times, including in the head.

In 2005, he was caught while on temporary release from the prison, suspected of assisting a fellow inmate at the Hall prison in an escape attempt. In February 2007, he was released on probation.

== Medical school controversy ==
In the fall of 2007, Hellekant enrolled in medical school at the Karolinska University Hospital. When his criminal history became known to the university as well as the media in early November, a debate ensued as to whether a convicted murderer should be allowed to practice medicine. While some commentators called for Hellekant to be expelled from the university, Karolinska decided that he would be allowed to continue his studies, with head master Harriet Wallberg-Henriksson stating there was no legal way to expel him, as "no national policy covers the situation".

She did however state that she considers it unethical to let convicted murderers practice medicine, and that it would be hard for Hellekant to get a physicians' license from the National Board of Health and Welfare, which is required to practice. In January 2008, it was discovered that Hellekant apparently had falsified the name on his high school transcripts, and that the authenticity of his high school grades could not be verified. He was then expelled from Karolinska. However, in 2009 it was reported that Hellekant had been accepted to medical school at Uppsala University.

The case generated a debate within the medical community, both in Sweden and abroad, over the appropriate criteria for exclusion from medical school. Bioethicist Jacob M. Appel, an advocate for Hellekant, argued that "medical authorities would be remiss if they overlooked the unique, positive characterisistics that a gifted ex-felon might bring to the profession" and suggested that felons might be well-suited to the distinctive demands of providing medical care within the prison system.
