= Info-14 =

Defunct neo-Nazi newspaper

Info-14 was a neo-Nazi newspaper, later a website. It started as a newspaper and published in paper form from April 1995 until May 2000, when it went online. The paper was started as a binding factor within the National Alliance with Robert Vesterlund, earlier member of the Sweden Democrats and chairman of Sweden Democratic Youth (SDU), as editor. According to the ten year chronicle in May 2005 the first editions were produced at the party headquarters of the Sweden Democrats in Stockholm, where the production was done on a copying machine. The number 14 in the paper name comes from David Lane's Fourteen Words.

When the National Alliance was disbanded after Christopher Rangne left his post, Robert Vesterlund continued his work on Info-14, now as an independent paper. The paper claimed one police killing in Malexander and a car bomb in Nacka in 1999, leading the paper's editor, Vesterlund, to be sentenced to eighteen months in prison for incitement to racial hatred, threats against an officer, and aggravated incitement. The paper is synonymous with the Salem Foundation which organizes "Salem Marches" (salemmarschen or folkets marchen). A number of "independent nationalists" are gathered around Info-14.

In 1998, Hampus Hellekant murdered syndicalist union member Björn Söderberg after Söderberg exposed the ideology of Vesterlund in the workplace. The case also became the focus of an important debate over privacy and medical ethics.
