= Ottar (magazine) =

Swedish magazine

- Editor: Carolina Hemlin, Ida Måwe
- Frequency: Quarterly
- Circulation: 7,000
- Founded: 1971
- Country: Sweden
- Based in: Stockholm
- Website: ottar.se
- ISSN: 1650-8017

Ottar is a Swedish magazine focusing on sexuality politics. It was founded in 1971 and is published by the Swedish Association for Sexuality Education (RFSU). It is named in honor of RFSU's founder, Elise Ottesen-Jensen, who was known as "Ottar." It is published quarterly and has a circulation of 7,000. It covers topics such as abortion, family planning, sexual and reproductive rights, love and sexual politics in general in Sweden and internationally. The co-editors-in-chief are Carolina Hemlin and Ida Måwe. While owned by RFSU, the magazine is independent and is published in accordance with journalistic principles.
