= Eva X Moberg =

Swedish journalist

- Born: Eva Maria Moberg; 13 May 1962; Jukkasjärvi, Lapland, Sweden
- Died: 4 May 1999 (aged 36); Hägerstensåsen, Stockholm, Sweden
- Occupation: Journalist
- Known for: Organising the Labour Convoy to Tuzla
- Movement: Anarchism

Eva X Moberg (13 May 1962 – 4 May 1999) was a Swedish journalist and anarchist activist. She was the editor-in-chief of the anarchist magazine Brand, organised a "Labour Convoy" to the besieged city of Tuzla during the Bosnian War and wrote a column for the newspaper Aftonbladet. During the last years of her life, she contracted cancer, which she publicly wrote about to destigmatise the illness.

== Biography ==
Eva X Moberg was born in 1962, the daughter of Ingemar Moberg. She lived in Hägersten, a suburb of Stockholm. During the 1980s, she became involved in the Swedish anarchist movement, squatting a house on Folkungagatan and editing Brand, which became one of the most influential countercultural magazines of the late 1980s and early 1990s. Her experience editing the magazine led her to become a journalist, contributing to the daily newspaper Aftonbladet.

Following the outbreak of the Bosnian War, the city of Tuzla found itself under siege by the Republik Srpska, preventing food and fuel from entering the city. In December 1993, Moberg led a campaign by International Workers Aid (IWA) to transport supplies to Tuzla, organising a "Labour Convoy" (Swedish: Arbetarkonvojen) with the aid of unions from several different countries. They quickly hit administrative hurdles, as Swedish NGOS insisted that the IWA unload its supplies at the UNHCR warehouse "like everybody else". They refused, as they wanted to establish direct contact with the people that would be receiving the supplies. Moberg travelled to Tuzla several times, later reporting that the IWA organised 30 supply convoys during the course of the war. During this time, she wrote a column for Aftonbladet, in which she publicised the situation in Bosnia to Swedish readers and raised the IWA's own profile in the process. By the end of Yugoslav Wars, the IWA's presence in Tuzla wound to a close.

In 1995, Moberg edited her last issue of Brand; she handed the magazine over to the younger generation of anarchist writers. In her own columns, she expressed support for the rising anti-fascist movement and criticised police brutality in crackdowns of political demonstrations. In the summer of 1996, Moberg began to notice that her body was struggling to keep up with exercise. Soon after, she was diagnosed with breast cancer. She decided to write for Aftonbladet about her experiences with cancer, hoping to destigmatise discussions about the disease and help others through their own treatment. For her reports, in December 1998, she received the Vilhelm Moberg scholarship; and in April 1999, she was honoured by the Swedish Cancer Society. By this time, she was convinced that she had overcome her illness.

On 4 May 1999, Eva X Moberg died from cancer, at the age of 36. Her last words were "I love you all. What a wonderful life it has been." Her memorial service in Stockholm was attended by hundreds of people.

== Bibliography ==
- Meurling, Olle (15 May 1999). "Brandredaktören Eva X Moberg död". Motkraft Nyhetsbrev (in Swedish). Vol. 51, no. 19 – via AInfos.
- Moll, Nicolas (2021). Solidarity is More Than a Slogan: International Workers Aid During and After the 1992–1995 War in Bosnia and Herzegovina (PDF). Rosa Luxemburg Foundation.
- Renström, Christer (29 May 1999). "Vännerna tog adjö av Eva X Moberg" [Friends say goodbye to Eva X Moberg]. Aftonbladet (in Swedish).
- Wallin, Ulf (7 April 1999). "Artiklarna om cancern gav Eva pris igen" [The articles about cancer gave Eva a prize again]. Aftonbladet (in Swedish).
