= Murder of Björn Söderberg =

Swedish anarcho-syndicalist and politically-motivated murdered in 1999

Björn Söderberg
- Born: Björn Mikael Söderberg; 1 April 1958; Spånga, Sweden
- Died: 12 October 1999 (aged 41); Skärholmen, Sweden
- Cause of death: Gunshot wounds
- Occupation: Labour unionist
- Organisation: SAC Syndikalisterna

Björn Mikael Söderberg (1 April 1958 – 12 October 1999) was a Swedish syndicalist active in the Stockholm local federation of the SAC, murdered in Sätra, Stockholm on 12 October 1999.

== Murder ==
Björn Söderberg had made a tip to the newspaper Arbetaren owned by Sveriges Arbetares Centralorganisation (SAC) about his colleague Robert Vesterlund. This tip led to an article in Arbetaren on 16 September 1999 revealing that Vesterlund, a member of the fascist organisation Nationell Ungdom, had been elected as member of the board of the local Commercial Employees' Union. As a result of this Robert Vesterlund resigned his job and was forced out of the union.

This was the motive for the two men, Hampus Hellekant and Björn Lindberg-Hernlund (both with strong ties to Nationell Ungdom), who visited Björn Söderberg at his apartment in Sätra on 12 October and shot him to death.

== Aftermath ==
Hampus Hellekant and Björn Lindberg-Hernlund were convicted of murder in the Court of Appeal and Jimmy Niklasson, also a member of Nationell Ungdom, was convicted of “grovt vapenbrott och skyddande av brottsling” – serious weapon-related crime and protecting a criminal.

On 23 October, a crowd of 20,000 people gathered on Medborgarplatsen to take part in an anti-fascist meeting and 12 October was appointed Day of Civil Courage by SAC. On that day a prize in civil courage is given in memory of Söderberg's murder.

== See also ==
- Anarchism in Sweden
