= Axel Holmström =

Axel Holmström can refer to:

- Axel Holmström (anarchist) (1881–1947), Swedish anarchist
- Axel Holmström (ice hockey) (born 1996), Swedish professional ice hockey player
