= Swedish Anarcho-Syndicalist Youth Federation =

Syndicalist Youth Federation Syndikalistiska Ungdomsförbundet
- Founded: 1993
- Ideology: Syndicalism; Autonomism Anarchism
- Website: www.suf.cc

The Swedish Anarcho-Syndicalist Youth Federation, (Swedish: Syndikalistiska Ungdomsförbundet, SUF) is a youth-based group in Sweden that supports independent working class struggle.

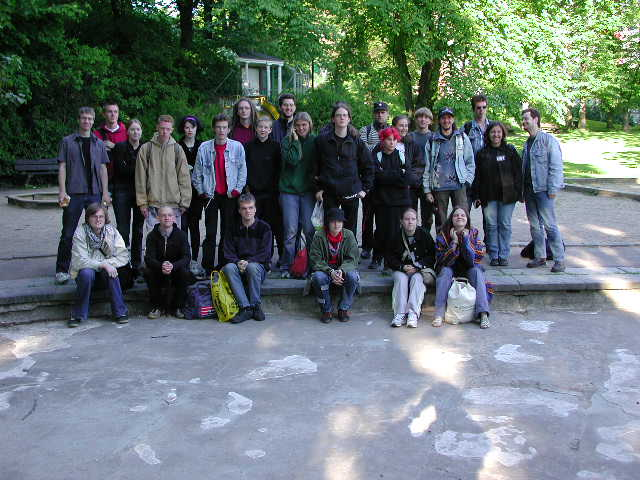
During the EU summit in Gothenburg, the SUF hosted an international meeting for syndicalist youth despite police attacks on counter-network infrastructure

The federation was founded in 1993, in part rooted in the militant autonomous youth movement that had begun to grow throughout Scandinavia in the early 1990s.

Inspiration also came from the anarcho-syndicalist trade union Central Organisation of the Workers of Sweden. Today it is a nationwide federation made up of around 25 local groups, located throughout the entire country. Aside from the Samordningsgruppen, SOG; whose purpose is nothing but to coordinate the activities of the local clubs, several other committees serve various purposes within the federation, such as production of propaganda. Ever since the early 1990s, the SUF published a magazine called Direkt Aktion.

SUF is, in contrast to its anarcho-syndicalist beliefs, not a union. Their idea of anarcho-syndicalism expands beyond the daily labour union activity, and claims that in a global community where capitalist relations have expanded into all parts of society, a broader movement and a broader definition of class struggle is needed. Thus, they believe it is necessary to confront capitalism not only in workplaces, but also in schools, universities, local communities, etc.

== Predecessors ==
In 1930, the SAC established the Swedish Syndicalist Youth Federation (Swedish: Sveriges Syndikalistiska Ungdomsförbund; SUF), its first youth section. This incarnation of the SUF was disbanded in 1955, during the post-war restructuring of the SAC. In 1958, the SAC established another youth wing, the Syndicalist Group Movement (Swedish: Syndikalistiska Grupprörelsen; SG), which had student groups in Stockholm, Gothenburg, Uppsala, and elsewhere. The movement published the magazine Zenit through 1967. It disbanded in 1970.

== Campaigns ==
=== Planka.nu ===
The network Planka.nu (Fare-dodge.now) was initially initiated as a campaign by SUF in 2001. The campaign (and later independent initiative) dealt with public transportation, seeking a shift from soaring prices to a tax-financed model. The campaign got a lot of attention because of the unorthodox methods; Planka.nu encourage people to fare-dodge in the public transport and organizes an insurance fund, p-kassan, that pays the fines of its members it they get caught fare-dodging.

=== Nu jävlar är det nog ===
Nu jävlar är det nog (It's enough now, damnit), was a nationwide anti-racist campaign initiated by SUF on 24 August 2004 and ended on 1 February 2005. It claimed to be different from other anti-racist campaigns in that it also took in account factors such as social class.

=== Klasskampen tar inte semester ===
Klasskampen tar inte semester - "There is no vacation for the class struggle" - was SUF's nationwide campaign about summer jobs. It lasted for five months, from 1 May to 1 October 2005. It was criticized for allegedly encouraging people to commit illegal acts.

=== Osynliga Partiet ===
The nationwide campaign Osynliga partiet (the Invisible Party) was partly initiated by SUF. The campaign first received media attention when winner of the political reality show Toppkandidaterna, Petter Nilsson, donated part of his prize to SUF for financing part of the campaign, which was heavily criticized after the offices of the Centre Party were vandalized following their announcement of their intention to dismantle the Employment Security Act, with the logo of the campaign found at the site. In addition to this, a few offices of the Christian Democrats were also attacked.

== See also ==
- Central Organisation of the Workers of Sweden, Sveriges Arbetares Centralorganisation
- Invisible Party, Osynliga Partiet - a campaign initiated by SUF
- Direkt Aktion

== Bibliography ==
- Flaherty, Colm (2022). A Politics of Community: Identity, Stigma, and Meaning in the Extra-Parliamentary Left (PhD). Lund University. ISBN 978-91-8039-246-4.
- Jämte, Jan; Sörbom, Adrienne (2016). "Why Did It Not Happen Here? The Gradual Radicalization of the Anarchist Movement in Sweden 1980–90". In Andresen, Knud; van der Steen, Bart (eds.). A European Youth Revolt. Palgrave Studies in the History of Social Movements. London: Palgrave Macmillan. pp. 97–111. doi:10.1007/978-1-137-56570-9_7. ISBN 978-1-137-56569-3.
- Jämte, Jam (2018). "Radical anti-fascism in Scandinavia: Shifting frames in relation to the transformation of the far right". In Wennerhag, Magnus; Fröhlich, Christian; Piotrowski, Grzegorz (eds.). Radical Left Movements in Europe. Routledge. ISBN 9781315603483.
- Jämte, Jan; Ellefsen, Rune (2020). "The Consequences of Soft Repression". Mobilization: An International Quarterly. 25 (3): 383–404. doi:10.17813/1086-671X-25-3-383.
- Jämte, Jan; Lundstedt, Måns; Wennerhag, Magnus (2020). "From Radical Counterculture to Pragmatic Radicalism? The Collective Identity of Contemporary Radical Left-libertarian Activism in Sweden". Journal for the Study of Radicalism. 14 (1). Michigan State University Press: 1–36. doi:10.14321/jstudradi.14.1.0001. ISSN 1930-1189. JSTOR 10.14321/jstudradi.14.1.0001.
- Jämte, Jan; Lundstedt, Måns; Wennerhag, Magnus (2023). "Radical Left Movements in Scandinavia, 1980–2020: Straddling Militant Counterculture and Popular Movements". In Zúquete, José Pedro (ed.). The Palgrave Handbook of Left-Wing Extremism. Vol. 1. Palgrave Macmillan. pp. 281–304. doi:10.1007/978-3-031-30897-0_16. ISBN 978-3-031-30897-0.
- Kuhn, Gabriel (2014). "Syndicalism in Sweden: A Hundred Years of the SAC". In Ness, Immanuel (ed.). New Forms of Worker Organization: The Syndicalist and Autonomist Restoration of Class-Struggle Unionism. PM Press. pp. 168–183. ISBN 978-1-60486-956-9.
- Lee, Ching Kwan; Kofman, Yelizavetta (2012). "The Politics of Precarity: Views Beyond the United States". Work and Occupations. 39 (4): 388–408. doi:10.1177/0730888412446710.
