= Swedish Association for Sexuality Education =

Swedish education organization

- Riksförbundet för sexuell upplysning
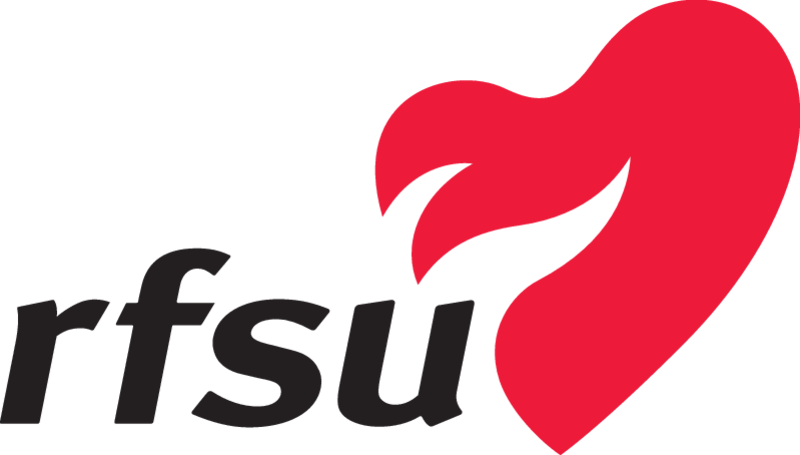
- Abbreviation: RFSU
- Formation: 1933; 93 years ago
- Type: nonprofit organization
- Purpose: Reproductive health and -rights, sex education
- Headquarters: Stockholm, Sweden
- Members: 5500 and associates
- President: Lina Fridén
- Secretary-General: Ingela Holmertz
- Website: www.rfsu.se

The Swedish Association for Sexuality Education (Swedish: Riksförbundet för sexuell upplysning, RFSU) is a Swedish nonprofit organization that works with public opinion formation on sexual and reproductive health. It also works with rights, as well as information and education about sexuality and relationships. One of RFSU's main issues is the right to free abortion. The current president is Lina Fridén and Secretary-General is Ingela Holmertz.

RFSU was founded February 24, 1933, by, among others, Elise Ottesen-Jensen, Gunnar Inghe and Hanna Lundin. Ottesen-Jensen was chairman from its inception until 1959, and has come to be strongly associated with the organization, whose journal, Ottar, was named after her.

RFSU works with information, education and advocacy by organizing courses, conferences and debates. Moreover, the RFSU carries an extensive international work with similar organizations in other countries. RFSU is the Swedish national affiliate of the International Planned Parenthood Federation.

RFSU is the owner of RFSU AB, the former owner of Etac AB. RFSU AB sells condoms, lubricants, pregnancy tests and sex toys. Etac is a Swedish multinational group, that develops, manufactures and sells products for people with reduced mobility. Since 2011, Etac has been fully owned by Swedish Nordstjernan.
