= Lund's Anarchist Group =

Swedish anarchist organization

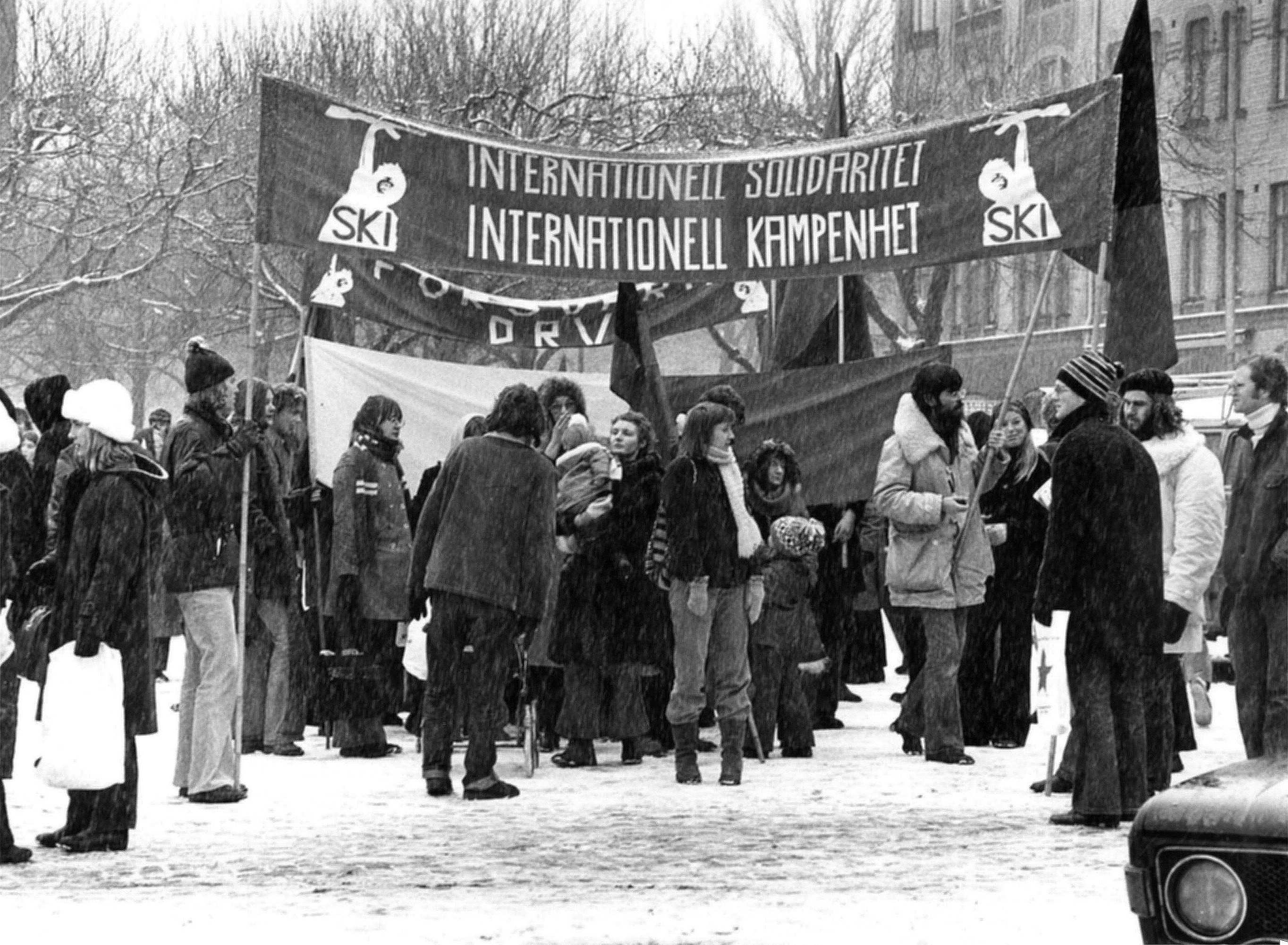
Lunds Anarkistgrupp protesting together with the Swedish Committee for Indochina

Lund's Anarchist Group (Swedish: Lunds Anarkistgrupp) was a Swedish anarchist organization, founded in 1969 in the city of Lund. Its ideology was a mix of different streams of thought, including green anarchism.

== History ==
The group was formed in Spring of 1969 by two individuals using the pseudonyms Keddy and Kriss. Preparations for the founding had begun the previous year. Many new members soon joined, and the group began holding regular meetings in Lund's Book Café and the "AF Castle" in Lundagård, the Academic Association's building. It was part of a wave of newly formed anarchist groups in Sweden, formed in the wake of the May 1968 events in France and the world-wide protests of 1968 - others were created in Umeå, Jönköping, Stockholm, and Växjö. The group published Lund's Free Press (Swedish: Lunds Fria Press). Activities were centered around a housing collective on Trädgårdsgatan, where reprints of classic anarchist literature were published.

The heavily activistic Anarchist Group was involved in a large number of actions, gaining influence despite its relatively low number of members. Activities that the organization was involved in include - among others - three occupations for the establishment of an all-activity community center, prisoner support, protests against the South African Apartheid regime, opposition to the annual nationalistic Charles XII March, and various environmental campaigns. The group also participated in several peace movement campaigns, including opposition to United States involvement in the Vietnam War and opposition to the system of conscription. Its most well-known involvement was in a campaign against the political psychiatric system, especially an attack on 30 January 1970 when the Forensic Psychiatric Clinic in Lund was burnt down just prior to its opening.

== Dissolution ==
Lund's Anarchist Group remained active until 1973, when it together with MUSK (Malmö Ungsocialistiska Klubb) in connection to the general election that year published the comic book Valhoppet and a politically themed deck of playing cards, the De Löjliga Partierna ("The Silly Parties"). Soon after that the group splintered. Many members were caught up in the "Green Wave" of radical counterurbanization during the 1970s in Sweden.

== See also ==
- Anarchism in Sweden
