= Elise Ottesen-Jensen =

Norwegian–Swedish anarchist, journalist, and sex educator (1886–1973)

- Elise Ottesen-Jensen, also known as Ottar
- Born: 2 January 1886; Høyland Municipality, Norway
- Died: 4 September 1973 (aged 87); Stockholm, Sweden
- Resting place: Skogskyrkogården, Sweden
- Occupation: Journalist
- Known for: Swedish Association for Sexuality Education (RFSU)
- Spouse: Albert Jensen (1931–1937)
- Parent(s): Immanuel Ottesen (1834–1919), Karen Arselle Essendrop (1844–1909)

Elise Ottesen-Jensen, also known as Ottar (2 January 1886 − 4 September 1973), was a Norwegian-Swedish sex educator, journalist, and anarchist agitator, whose main mission was to fight for women's rights to understand and control their own body and sexuality. She was a member of the Swedish anarcho-syndicalist union Central Organisation of the Workers of Sweden. Her followers consider her a pioneer in the field of women's rights and feminism.

Her personal motto was "I dream of the day when every new born child is welcome, when men and women are equal, and when sexuality is an expression of intimacy, joy and tenderness."

== Life and career ==
A vicar's daughter, Ottar was born Elise Ottesen in Høyland Municipality (incorporated into Sandnes Municipality in 1965) in Rogaland county, Norway. She was Immanuel Ottesen and Karen Arselle Essendrop's 17th out of 18 children, and as was customary in Norway at that time she was named Elise after her sister who died as an infant the year before. The name Ottar was her journalist pseudonym and was an abbreviation of her last name, but also a reference to the Norwegian Viking chief Ohthere of Hålogaland (Norwegian: Ottar fra Hålogaland).

Later in life, her father sent away her little sister Magnhild to give birth in Denmark, so that she could be forced to give up her child. Maghild was told nothing about pregnancy or birth, and for nine months she feared that her stomach would just split. She committed suicide because of the longing for the child she had to leave behind. For this, Ottar could never forgive her father, and the fate of her sister became a strong driving force for her commitment to the struggle for women's rights.

Ottar's dream was to become a dentist, but an explosion in the chemistry laboratory of her high school injured her fingers, spoiling her chances to pursue a dentist career. Instead she started to work in a newspaper, and eventually became a journalist. She had always questioned the preachings of her father, and early on arrived at the conclusion that she was not a Christian. She now found that her sympathies were with the socialists, and it was with them she would struggle for the rest of her life.

She made several attempts to organize working-class women. But soon they started asking her for advice in sexual matters, asking her questions like "Do I always have to when my husband wants to?", "What can I do to avoid getting pregnant?".

By the end of the First World War, in 1913, Ottar met and developed a close friendship with the Swedish anarcho-syndicalist peace agitator Albert Jensen. They married in 1931, and Elise Ottesen changed her surname to Ottesen-Jensen. When Albert Jensen was expelled from Norway, she came with him to Denmark. There, she gave birth to their child, who died soon after birth.

Ottar and Albert moved to Sweden, and she came to know a doctor who amongst other things taught her how to use a diaphragm. She then set out for her first nationwide tour, in Sweden. She travelled from Scania to Norrland, teaching female workers how to avoid pregnancy. She agitated for the right for women to experience sexual pleasure, for free abortion, for the repealing of the laws against contraceptives, for gay rights, and more. What she did was illegal and she risked harsh penalties.

In the 1920s, Ottar was a regular writer for Arbetaren, with her own column focusing on feminist issues. After a disagreements with the other editors of Arbetaren in 1925, she started her own paper, Vi kvinnor. The paper did, however, not last long. A few years later, she also wrote for the anarchist magazine Brand.

In 1933, Ottar, together with a number of radical medical doctors and trade union representatives, founded the Swedish Association for Sexuality Education (Swedish: Riksförbundet för sexuell upplysning, RFSU). She became its first president, and held this post until 1956. Ottesen-Jensen was also one of the founders of the International Planned Parenthood Federation (IPPF), in 1953. A paper published by RFSU bears the name "Ottar", to honour Elise Ottesen-Jensen. This paper changed its name to "Ottar" in 2001, and was earlier known as "RFSU bulletin". The name Ottar has also been used to name the Norwegian feminist group Kvinnegruppa Ottar, who were officially founded in 2006.

She was awarded the Illis quorum by the Swedish government in 1951 and honorary doctorate in medicine in Uppsala in 1958.

== Bibliography ==
- Ovälkomna barn: ett ord till kvinnorna (1926)
- Könslagarnas offer (1928)
- Människor i nöd : Det sexuella mörkrets offer (1932)
- Sexualundervisningen (In Sexuallivet i modern belysning, edited by Arne Tallberg, 1944)
- Säg barnet sanningen (1945)
- ABC för ett lyckligt äktenskap (with Nils Nielsen, 1947)
- Och livet skrev (1965)
- Livet skrev vidare (1966)
- Arbetarrörelsen – männens eller mänsklighetens rörelse? (a selection of Ottar's articles in Arbetaren and Brand in the 1920s, by Ingrid Primander, 1980)

Unpublished work:

- The archives from Riksförbund för sexuell upplysning, in Arbetarrörelsens arkiv och bibliotek
- Elise Ottesen-Jensens korrespondanse og klipparkiv, in Planned Parenthood Federation of America Library

== See also ==
- Anarcha-feminism
- Feminist sex wars
- Feminist sexology
- First-wave feminism
- LGBTQ rights in Denmark
- LGBTQ rights in Norway
- LGBTQ rights in Sweden
- Sex-positive feminism
- Women's work
