= Unemployment funds in Sweden =

In Sweden, an unemployment fund (Swedish: arbetslöshetskassa) is an economic association tied to a trade union, except the Unemployment fund Alfa and a few unemployment funds for self-employed and employers.

Since July 1, 2002, an unemployment fund is to some extent equal to a government agency, and is as thus comprised by the Freedom of the Press Act of the Swedish constitution. The primary function of the unemployment funds is to administrate and pay unemployment benefits, according to law (Lag om arbetslöshetsförsäkring (1997:238) and Lag om arbetslöshetskassor (1997:239)).

The Swedish unemployment insurance is in general divided into two parts – the basic insurance (Alfa-kassan) and a voluntary funds (which are mostly more profitable for the unemployed).

== Alfa-kassan ==
Alfa-kassan fund is independent and under certain conditions its financial help is available to all Swedish citizens (or residents) over the age of 20, regardless of work field. This insurance is mandatory and consists of flat rate benefit of 365 SEK (~34 EUR) per day. The requirements to obtain this benefit are as follows:

• to be enrolled at the Public Employment Service (Arbetsförmedlingen)

• to be (partly) unemployed

• actively seek for work and be prepared to accept a suitable job

• be able to work at least 3 hours a day, 17 hours per week

• to have worked at least 80 hours per month for 6 months (which don't have to be consecutive)

• to have worked 480 hours during 6 consecutive calendar months for a minimum of 50 hours every month

== Voluntary funds ==
Voluntary income-related insurance works on a principle of a membership. Since you are a member of this type of fund for at least 12 months and you have worked 6 months of half-time work, you are allowed to get the payment equal to 80% of your regular salary (for the first 200 days of unemployment). Although the maximum is 910 SEK (~84 EUR) per day. For the following 100 days you receive 70% of your average income, but maximum is 760 SEK (~70 EUR) per day. There is also an advantage for unemployed parents of small children (under the age of 18), they can get the 70% of their normal income for additional 150 days.

The membership is a little bit limited as well. You have to be less than 64 years old. You cannot be a member of 2 or more funds at the same time. And you have to pay a membership fees.

== List of funds ==
There are 26 unemployment insurance funds in Sweden. Mostly they are administrated by labour unions. Around 80% of Swedish workforce is covered by these funds.

• Unemployment Insurance Fund for Graduates (Akademikernas arbetslöshetskassa)

• The Alfa Unemployment Insurance Fund (Arbetslöshetskassan Alfa)

• The Unemployment Insurance Fund for Service and Communications Employees (Arbetslöshetskassan för Service och Kommunikation)

• The Vision Unemployment Insurance Fund (Arbetslöshetskassan Vision)

• The Building Workers' Unemployment Insurance Fund (Byggnads arbetslöshetskassa)

• The Electricians' Unemployment Insurance Fund (Elektrikernas arbetslöshetskassa)

• The Building Maintenance Workers' Unemployment Insurance Fund (Fastighetsanställdas arbetslöshetskassa)

• The Financial and Insurance Employees' Unemployment Insurance Fund (Finans-och försäkringsbranschens arbetslöshetskassa)

• GS Unemployment Insurance Fund (GS Arbetslöshetskassa)

• The Dockworkers’ Unemployment Insurance Fund (Hamnarbetarnas arbetslöshetskassa)

• The Commercial Employees’ Unemployment Insurance Fund (Handelsanställdas arbetslöshetskassa, HA)

• The Hotel and Restaurant Workers' Unemployment Insurance Fund (Hotell-och restauranganställdas arbetslöshetskassa)

• Industrial and Metal workers´ Unemployment Insurance Fund (IF Metalls arbetslöshetskassa)

• The Journalists' Unemployment Insurance Fund (Journalisternas arbetslöshetskassa)

• The Municipal Workers' Unemployment Insurance Fund (Kommunalarbetarnas arbetslöshetskassa, KAAK)

• The Management Staff's Unemployment Insurance Fund (Ledarnas arbetslöshetskassa)

• The Food Workers' Unemployment Insurance Fund (Livsmedelsarbetarnas arbetslöshetskassa)

• The Teachers' Unemployment Insurance Fund (Lärarnas arbetslöshetskassa)

• The Pulp and paper Workers' Unemployment Insurance Fund (Pappersindustriarbetarnas arbetslöshetskassa)

• The Unemployment Insurance Fund for Entrepreneurs (Småföretagarnas arbetslöshetskassa, SmåA)

• ST's Unemployment Insurance Fund (STs Arbetslöshetskassa)

• The Swedish Workers' Unemployment Insurance Fund (Sveriges Arbetares Arbetslöshetskassa, SAAK)

• Unemployment insurance fund of the Swedish Entrepreneurs (Sveriges Entreprenörers arbetslöshetskassa)

• The Salesmen's Unemployment Insurance Fund (Säljarnas arbetslöshetskassa)

• The Transport Workers’ Unemployment Insurance Fund (Transportarbetarnas arbetslöshetskassa)

• The Union's Unemployment Insurance Fund (Unionens arbetslöshetskassa)

== See also ==
- SAC Syndikalisterna
- Unemployment benefits in Sweden
- Welfare in Sweden
- Nordic model
- Collective agreement
