= National Alliance (Sweden) =

The National Alliance (Swedish: Nationella Alliansen) was a neo-Nazi organisation run by Robert Vesterlund. Previously known as SUNS (Stockholms Unga NationalSocialister) and formed by Vesterlund at the same time as he ran Sverigedemokratisk Ungdom, they published the magazine Info 14. Christopher Rangne was appointed leader in 1996 and the group was contemplating the launch of a National Republican Army (NRA), to function in tandem like the IRA and Sinn Féin. Rangne was previously one of the main players in the White Aryan Resistance movement. National Alliance disbanded in 1997.
