= Unemployment benefits in Sweden =

Unemployment benefits in Sweden are payments made by the state or other authorized bodies to unemployed people. They can be divided into a voluntary scheme with income-related compensation up to a certain level, or a comprehensive scheme that provides a lower level of basic support.

== History ==
“Help-funds", the first form of unemployment insurance in Sweden, were created in the 1870s. They are closely linked to trade unions. Since the institution of local employment agencies in the 1930s, and amid the climate of Keynesian policies, the State began to finance unemployment benefits. Since the 1940s, the aim of unemployment insurance was to "provide economic support during a 'transitional period' when the individual who lost his/her employment or left school actively seeks a new employment". In 1948, the employment offices were nationalised, and the National Labour Market Board was established as the central authority, charged also with the task of supervising the voluntary employment relief funds, which were subsidised and controlled by the unions. Since 2004, the latter task has been overseen by the Unemployment Assistance Board.

Labor market policies in the post-war period were built on two concepts: the "active labour market policy", and the task of unemployment insurance to support the readjustment of individuals to the labor market. To have this effect, unemployment insurance had to have some features:

It should not be paid unless the individual has the possibility to take on work during at least a minimum number of hours each week. It should be required for individuals to look for work actively. It should require individuals to participate in labour market programmes which aim to support the individual's possibilities to reenter the labour market. The person should not be allowed to look only for the same kind of job in the long run, as they had before or have been training for. The person should not be allowed to only look for a job within a limited geographical area.

== Main features ==
The Swedish unemployment insurance system has two components: basic insurance and voluntary income-related insurance. Basic insurance is granted to anyone who meets the basic work requirements: 320 SEK per day are granted to anyone over 20 years of age who is enrolled at the employment office and is carrying out a job-seeking plan. Voluntary income-related insurance requires the worker to join one of the 36 independent unemployment funds. To become one of the 3.4 million recipients (2013) of unemployment funds, a worker must have been employed for at least one month and then be registered as a jobseeker in the public employment service agency and be at the disposal of the labour market. After one year of uninterrupted membership to an unemployment fund, and six months of half-time work, a worker is entitled to receive an earnings-related daily allowance of up to 80% of his or her regular income (with a maximum of 680 SEK per day) for the first 200 days. Regular income is the average income during the previous 12 months, including days of unemployment. After 200 days the rate decreases to 70% until the 300th day, and 70% from day 301-450 (only available for parents of children under the age of 18). After 300 (or 450) benefit days, anyone who is still unemployed can obtain a place in the Jobb-och utvecklingsgarantin (Job and development guarantee) labor market program.

As declared by the Swedish Unemployment Insurance Bard (IAF) in 2006, 553,000 workers received benefits during the year, and the unemployment funds paid them 29.9 billion SEK, or an average 54,069 SEK per applicant. In fact, a form of intra-fund solidarity can be traced up; funds usually do not compete for members, as the trade unions usually refer to a "fund organizational area", and costs at this time were covered in solidarity by all the funds. This resulted in similar membership fees for every sector. Moreover, the funds’ costs were mainly paid by government grants. In 2006 only 9.4% of the unemployment benefits were financed by membership fees. Between 2006 and 2008, the share of workers affiliated with an unemployment fund decreased from 83% to 70%, attributable to hiked fund fees caused by decreased state-support. Fund fees returned to pre-2007 levels by 2014, when government funding was restored. In 2015, the density of unemployment funds was 71%, and union unemployment funds alone stood at 73%.

Some unions also promote collective complementary insurance to better cover the growing quota of unemployed who receive less than 80% of their previous wages. Unions offer this benefit to counteract the stagnation of the maximum compensation level and the rise of unemployed average and high-earners. Unions also seek to supplement benefits where the insurance program falls short. In 2005, 45% of those receiving unemployment benefits received less than 80% of their previous income. The collective complementary insurances are fully financed by union fees.

To apply for unemployment benefits from the unemployment insurance fund of you have to be a member. If you are not a member of an unemployment insurance fund, or do not wish to apply for membership of an unemployment insurance fund, you can apply for unemployment benefits from the Alfa-kassan fund. You send your application for unemployment benefits and other forms to your unemployment insurance fund. The forms you need to apply for unemployment benefits can be found on the website of each unemployment insurance fund.

== Subsequent developments ==
The Swedish welfare state and its “active labour market policies” remained quite intact after the deep recession of the 1990s. However, demand for labour remains under the level of the 1980s. Swedish politician and leader of the Moderate Party from 1999 to 2003, Bo Lundgren, claims the requirement for very intense job-seeking by the unemployed does not necessarily improve the system's functionality. A report written by Lundgren, in his position as head of the Supervisory Division of the Unemployment Insurance Board, argues that in a situation where there are often many job-seekers for each vacancy, the job-seeking activity should be limited to jobs where the applicant has a fair possibility of being offered the job. How to accomplish this is still a matter of discussion.

The problems concerning the effects of joining a Swedish labour market programme have been examined by Barbara Sianesi, who found several issues. If the programme had increased employment rates in its participants, these had also been found to remain significantly longer on benefits and in the unemployment programme. This was especially the case for those entering a programme after having been entitled to unemployment grants. The potential "locking-in effects" must also be examined. Some working categories—women with part-time jobs, manpower-employed, seasonal workers, students, self-employed businessmen—misuse the unemployment benefits and some administrative court cases are expected to clarify these categories for unemployment insurance.

In 2007, important aspects of the systems were revised. The Alliance for Sweden electoral coalition, who won the 2006 elections, endorsed each section of the labour market carrying its own costs of unemployment benefits paid out. This was intended to put pressure on wage levels, increase demand for labour, and reduce unemployment. They claimed a substantially larger portion of the costs for the insurance should be financed by individual fees of the involved workers, to stop the intra-fund solidarity mechanisms. From January 2007, fees to unemployment funds were raised significantly, mostly in funds with a high unemployment rate among the members. From July 2008, the differentiation of fund fees increased considerably. Large membership losses occurred for funds and trade unions. From 1 January 2007 to 31 December 2008, Swedish unions lost 245,000 members (8% of active members) and union unemployment funds almost 400,000 members (11%). Including non-union unemployment funds (the independent Alfa fund and the unemployment funds for self-employed and employers), almost half a million members left the funds. From 1 January 2014, fund fees were restored to about the same level as before 2007.

== See also ==
- Social security in Sweden
- Scandinavian welfare model
- Social Model
- Unemployment funds in Sweden
- Fas 3
- SAC Syndikalisterna
