= Helmut Rüdiger =

German anarcho-syndicalist and journalist (1903–1966)

- Rüdiger (c. 1930s)
- Born: 11 January 1903; Frankenberg, Saxony, German Empire
- Died: 9 June 1966 (aged 63); Madrid, Francoist Spain
- Citizenship: German (1903–1949); Swedish (1949–1966)
- Education: LMU Munich
- Years active: 1919–1966
- Organization(s): Free Workers' Union of Germany (1922–1933); Confederación Nacional del Trabajo (1933–1939); Central Organisation of the Workers of Sweden (1939–1966)
- Other political affiliations: International Workers' Association
- Movement: Anarcho-syndicalism
- Spouse: Dora Gollin

Helmut Rüdiger (1903–1966) was a German-Swedish journalist and anarcho-syndicalist activist. Born in Saxony, he became involved with the anarchist movement after the German Revolution of 1918–1919, becoming a leading member of the Free Workers' Union of Germany (FAUD). During the 1930s, he moved to Spain, where he participated in the Spanish Revolution of 1936. After the defeat of the Republicans in the Spanish Civil War, he fled to Sweden, where he became a leading member of the Central Organisation of the Workers of Sweden and an influential figure in the "revisionist" tendency of anarcho-syndicalism. He died in Spain in 1966, while trying to make contact with members of the anarchist underground.

== Biography ==
Helmut Rüdiger was born on 11 January 1903, in the Saxon town of Frankenberg, into the family of a theologian. He lived his early life in Chemnitz, where he joined the Wandervogel youth movement. During the German Revolution of 1918–1919, he began studying the works of the German anarchist Gustav Landauer, which converted him to anarcho-syndicalism.

After working within the unemployed workers' movement in Chemnitz, in 1922, he joined the newly established Free Workers' Union of Germany (FAUD). In 1925, he was elected chairman of the FAUD and moved to the Bavarian capital of Munich, where he studied German literature and art history at the Ludwig-Maximilians-Universität München (LMU). He then moved to Berlin in 1927. He succeeded Augustin Souchy as the editor of the FAUD's newspaper Der Syndikalist in 1928 and was elected to head its executive commission in 1930.

He soon became frustrated with the internal divisions within the FAUD, and in 1932, he left Germany and moved to Spain. Together with Arthur Lehning, he co-edited the German emigrant newspaper Internationale. He also maintained contact with underground groups of the FAUD, which had been banned by the authorities of Nazi Germany. After the outbreak of the Spanish Revolution of 1936, he was made head of German language propaganda for the Confederación Nacional del Trabajo (CNT). That same year, he was also elected as secretary of the International Workers' Association (IWA). In 1937, he organised the IWA's extraordinary congress in Paris. With the defeat of the Republicans in the Spanish Civil War, he fled to Sweden, where he joined the Central Organisation of the Workers of Sweden (SAC). Under the pseudonym "Ivar Bergeren", he edited the SAC's journal Arbetaren.

By 1949, he had become a Swedish citizen. He soon became one of the leading figures of the Swedish anarchist movement, and an influential theoretician of the "revisionist" tendency of anarcho-syndicalism. In response to the decline of the syndicalist movement and the increasing levels of sectarianism among anarcho-syndicalists, Rüdiger proposed that syndicalists work within existing trade unions rather than building new ones along syndicalist lines. In subsequent decades, he became to emphasise localism as a means to build libertarian socialism through federalism. During this period, he also contributed to the German anarchist magazine Die Freie Gesellschaft.

He visited Spain in 1966, looking to make contact with underground members of the CNT. In June of that year, Helmut Rüdiger died in Madrid.

== Selected works ==
- The Revolutionary Movement in Spain (1934)
- Anarcho-Syndicalism in the Spanish Revolution (1938)
- Syndikalism och Parlamentarism. Ett diskussionsinlägg om folkrepresentationens problem [Syndicalism and Parliamentarism: A Contribution to the Problem of People's Representation] (1945)
- Federalismen. Bidrag till en frihetens historia [Federalism: A Contribution for the History of Freedom]. (1947)
- Rudolf Rocker und die jüdische Arbeiterbewegung (1951)
- Der Sozialismus wird frei sein [Socialism Will Be Free] (1991)

== See also ==
- Anarchism in Germany

== Bibliography ==
- Elsinghorst, Amanda (1991) [1977]. "Helmut Rüdiger Papers". International Institute of Social History.
- Müller, Stefan (2009). "Rüdiger, Helmut (a.k.a. Rodriguez, Ivar Bergegren; Dashar, Stefan Stralsund) (1903–1966)". In Ness, Immanuel (ed.). The International Encyclopedia of Revolution and Protest. p. 1. doi:10.1002/9781405198073.wbierp1730. ISBN 978-1-4051-8464-9.
- Tuchel, Johannes, ed. (2021) [1996]. "Helmut Rüdiger". German Resistance Memorial Center.
