= Internment camps in Sweden during World War II =

Camps operated by Sweden during World War II

A number of internment camps were operated by Sweden during World War II. These camps were used for internment of, among others, suspected criminals, German refugees, anarchists and Swedish communists.

Military personnel from both sides in the war, if they entered Sweden without prior agreement, were also often subject to internment.

The camps were claimed to have been a decision necessary in the ambition to keep Sweden out of the war. It was made by the then-ruling grand coalition government under social democrat prime minister Per Albin Hansson, which included all parties in the Parliament of Sweden except the Communist Party of Sweden.

== Camps during the war ==
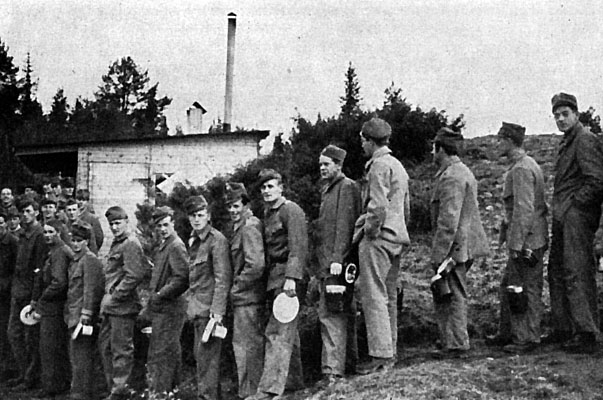
An internment camp in 1940

In February 1940, the decision was made to build several internment camps, which are believed to have held around 3,000 inmates between the years 1940–1948.

- Axmar, Gävle Municipality, Gävleborg County (1945)

- Ede, Krokom Municipality, Jämtland County (1943–1948)

- Florsberg, Söderhamn Municipality, Gävleborg County (1943–1948)

- Grytan, Östersund Municipality, Jämtland County (January–September 1942)

- Hälsingmo, Söderhamn Municipality, Gävleborg County (1943–1948)

- Ingels, Rättvik Municipality, Dalarna County (1942–1946)

- Kusfors, Norsjö Municipality, Västerbotten County (1944–1945)

- Långmora, Hedemora Municipality, Dalarna County (March 1940 – 1945)

- Lövnäsvallen, Härjedalen Municipality, Jämtland County (September 1941–January 1942)

- Naartijärvi, Haparanda Municipality, Norrbotten County (January–March 1940)

- Norra Bredåker, Boden Municipality, Norrbotten County (December 1939–January 1940) (Merged with Storsien internment camp in January 1940)

- Rengsjö, Bollnäs Municipality, Gävleborg County (1942–1945)

- Smedsbo, Falun Municipality, Dalarna County (March 1940 – 1945)

- Stensele, Storuman Municipality, Västerbotten County (August–October 1943)

- Storsien, Kalix Municipality, Norrbotten County (December 1939–April 1940; May–July 1940)

- Sunnerstaholm, Bollnäs Municipality, Gävleborg County (1945–1946)

- Säter, Säter Municipality, Dalarna County (1943–1946)

- Sörbyn, Boden Municipality, Norrbotten County (1944–1945)

- Tjörnarp, Höör Municipality, Skåne County (1945–1946)

- Vindeln, Vindeln Municipality, Västerbotten County (August–October 1943)

- Vägershult, Uppvidinge Municipality, Kronoberg County (1942–1945)

- Öxnered, Vänersborg Municipality, Västra Götaland County (September 1941–January 1942)

=== Internees ===
Internees were commonly suspected criminals, German refugees, left-wing activists or anti-Nazis. They were imprisoned without trial and without being informed of the accusations made against them. Most of these were foreigners.

=== Treatment ===
Wardens were instructed to ensure humane treatment of internees. All internees were forced to wear certain uniform and submit daily routines. Internees in Smedsbo internment camp had a typical daily routine of being woken up at 7.15am, they were then escorted to the dining room where they were expected to have their breakfast in complete silence followed by working passes. They were not permitted to leave their working station at any time. Jobs like road building, repair duty and woodcutting were commonly adopted. With one break for lunch, work proceeded until 2.45pm, after which internees were more or less free for the rest of the day.

== Internment of Allied air crews ==
A number of Western Allied servicemen, primarily crew members of the aircraft damaged during bombing missions over Germany, found themselves on Swedish soil, and were interned by the Swedish authorities.

Unlike civilian refugees from Germany, who were kept in internment camps, Allied airmen were placed in hotels and bed and breakfast establishments in the Falun area, and enjoyed relative freedom. They received their regular military pay from their home countries, which allowed them to be much better off than the local Swedish residents.

== Disclosure ==
In 2008, Swedish journalist Niclas Sennerteg and researcher Tobias Berglund published the book Swedish Concentration Camps in the Shadow of the Third Reich (Swedish title: Svenska koncentrationsläger i tredje rikets skugga), in which they expose what the government had kept secret regarding the presence of Swedish concentration camps. After the discovery was brought to media and thus public attention, the use of the term concentration camp has been highly debated.

== Post-war use of Swedish internment camps ==
After the war the internment camps were used to store foreigners that the Swedish government deemed dubious. However, details regarding much of this have still not been uncovered.

== Quotes ==
"Den svenska staten använder sig av brutala tvångs- och våldsmetoder för att eftertryckligt trampa ned den utländska antifascisten som likt en vrakspillra efter den tyska demokratins skeppsbrott kastats upp på svensk strand"

Translation:

"The Swedish government is using brutal methods to forcefully crush the foreign antifascists who like remnants after the shipwreck of the German democracy was washed upon Swedish shores."

"Det svenska folket får inte tolerera att oskyldiga människor kastas i fängelse och kvarhålles där på obestämd tid."

Translation:

"The Swedish people must not tolerate the imprisonment of innocent people for an undetermined time."

== See also ==
- List of concentration and internment camps
- Sweden in World War II
