= Axel Holmström (anarchist) =

Swedish anarchist

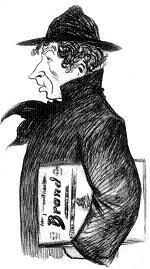

Axel Holmström (1881–1947) was a Swedish anarchist. He was jailed in 1906 after speaking at a public meeting. Holmström was editor of the anarchist paper Brand ("Fire").
