= SAC Syndikalisterna =

Swedish syndicalist trade union federation

- Central Organisation of Swedish Workers
- Sveriges Arbetares Centralorganisation
- Logo of the SAC

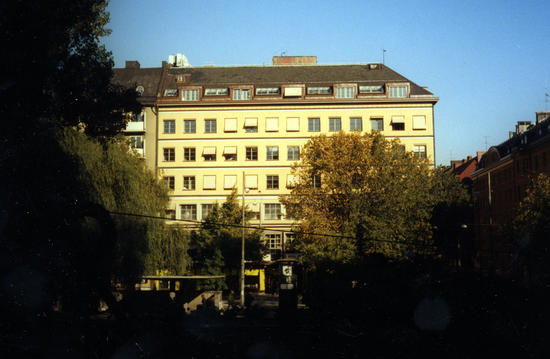
- SAC headquarters in Stockholm
- Established: 27 June 1910; 116 years ago
- Founded at: Stockholm, Sweden
- Type: National trade union federation
- Headquarters: Sveavägen 98, Stockholm
- Location: Sweden
- Members: 3,020 (2024)
- General Secretary: Agnes Lansrot
- Publication: Arbetaren, Syndikalisten
- Affiliations: International Workers' Association (1922–1958); Red and Black Coordination (2010–present)
- Website: sac.se

The Central Organisation of Swedish Workers (Swedish: Sveriges Arbetares Centralorganisation; (Note: Also translated as the Central Organisation of the Workers of Sweden, the Central Organisation of Sweden's Workers, or the Central Workers' Organisation of Sweden.) SAC) is a Swedish syndicalist trade union federation. The SAC organises people from all occupations and industries in one single federation, including the unemployed, students, and the retired. The SAC also publishes the weekly newspaper Arbetaren ("the Worker"), owns the publishing house Federativ and runs the unemployment fund Sveriges Arbetares Arbetslöshetskassa (SAAK).

== History ==
=== Establishment ===
Insignia of SAC

Trade unions were first established in Sweden during the late 19th century. During the 1890s, trade union activities were largely coordinated by the Swedish Social Democratic Party (SAP), which favoured reformism and electoralism over revolutionary syndicalism. In 1898, the SAP established the Swedish Trade Union Confederation (LO), the first national trade union centre in Sweden. Anarcho-syndicalism emerged in Sweden out of the far-left opposition to social democratic influence over the labour movement. Members of the Young Socialists (SUF) began to advocate for the adoption of the syndicalist methods of the French General Confederation of Labour (CGT). SUF member Albert Jensen became the leading advocate of anarcho-syndicalism in Sweden, synthesising the ideas of Daniel De Leon together with anarchist proposals for a post-capitalist society. In November 1906, leading members of the SUF were suspended from the SAP, cementing the organisation's definitive shift towards syndicalism. In August 1908, the SUF broke away from the SAP. They established their own party, which rejected reformism, electoralism and centralisation, endorsed the prefigurative conception of trade unionism and advocated for a revolutionary general strike.

By this time, the nascent Swedish Employers' Confederation (SAF) had established a collective bargaining agreement with the LO, which included a "right to work". But in 1908, industrial disputes between employers and workers were escalating into open class conflict, as lockouts threatened 220,000 Swedish workers with unemployment. Negotiations between the LO and SAF, mediated by the government, briefly halted the dispute. When negotiations halted and the lockouts resumed, on 4 August 1909, the LO called a 1909 Swedish general strike. Over 300,000 workers went on strike, shutting down the country's industrial economy. After one month, the LO called for a partial return to work, which resulted in the deescalation of the strike by the autumn, lasting until 13 November 1909. The strike was ultimately defeated; none of the workers' demands were met and thousands were dismissed from their jobs. The defeat caused widespread disillusionment among rank-and-file trade union members with their social-democratic union leaders. Half the LO's membership left the organisation over the following year.

By 1910, syndicalist opponents of the social-democrats had established the Central Organisation of Swedish Workers (SAC). In June 1910, the SAC held its founding congress in Stockholm, bringing together 37 delegates from various trade unions and socialist organisations, including the SUF; the delegates were largely men, with only one woman present. The SAC was established along syndicalist lines, based on the model of the French CGT and the North American Industrial Workers of the World (IWW), which organised it into a federation of local organisations. By the end of 1910, the SAC had 21 local federations, which brought together workers of various trades, largely construction workers, foresters, metalworkers, miners and stonemasons. The largest local federation was in the northern mining town of Kiruna. The SAC rapidly grew in size and influence over the course of the 1910s, coming to count 32,000 members by 1920. It remained relatively small compared to the LO, but was able to lead a series of strike actions by itself.

=== International relations ===
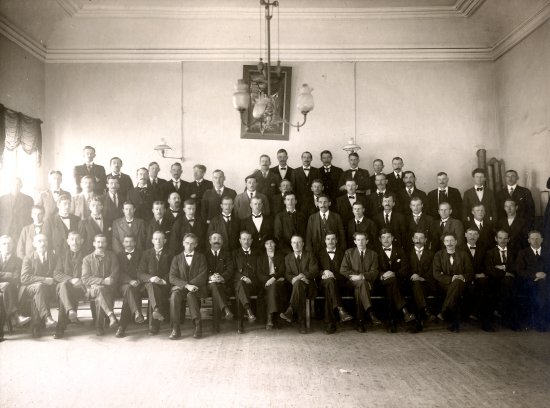
SAC workers conference, held in Örebro 25–26 November 1917, which resolved to plan mass action for the 8-hour working day in the spring of 1918.

In September 1913, delegates from the SAC attended the First International Syndicalist Congress in London, where they and other revolutionary syndicalist unions attempted to establish a Syndicalist International. However, this process was interrupted by the outbreak of World War I. Throughout the war and after, the SAC maintained close relations with the syndicalist federations in Norway and Denmark.

The SAC was sceptical of the rise of Bolshevism that occurred in the wake of the Russian Revolution, considering it to be a centralist and authoritarian ideology. It refused to affiliate to the Red International of Labor Unions (RILU), as the SAC considered it to be an organ of party politics and thus incompatible with the anti-political stance of syndicalism. In December 1920, the SAC participated in an international syndicalist conference in Berlin. When a Russian delegate encouraged the syndicalist delegates to affiliate themselves with the RILU, the SAC delegation responded by criticising the government of Vladimir Lenin and its political repression of the Russian anarchist movement.

The SAC attended the RILU's July 1921 congress in Moscow, where it supported a motion to keep the RILU independent from the Communist International, but the motion was defeated. Syndicalist unions that were in the opposition at this congress decided to establish their own international association. At a subsequent syndicalist conference, held in Düsseldorf in October 1921, delegates from the SAC supported the establishment of a syndicalist international. Back in Sweden, the SAC formally voted against affiliating with the Communist International in an internal referendum. In December 1922, the SAC, along with syndicalist unions from Argentina, Chile, Denmark, Germany, Italy, Mexico, the Netherlands, Norway, Portugal and Spain, established the International Workers' Association (IWA). Members of the SAC rapidly approved its affiliation with the IWA.

=== Division and repression ===
By the 1920s, Sweden was seeing the most industrial disputes of any country in Europe. In 1922, the SAC began publishing its journal Arbetaren (English: The Worker), through its publishing house Federativ. Membership of the SAC peaked at 37,000 in 1924. In 1928, the SAC experienced a split, as more radical syndicalist members, led by P. J. Welinder, left the organisation and established the Syndikalistiska Arbetarefederationen (English: Syndicalist Workers' Federation; SAF). Welinder believed that the SAC was too moderate and pushed for more confrontational tactics during strikes. Despite the split, the SAC maintained a membership of 35,000 throughout the 1930s, while the SAF had only a few thousand members. By the late 1930s, following the death of Welinder, the SAF merged back into the SAC.

In the wake of the Spanish Revolution of 1936, the SAC criticised the Confederación Nacional del Trabajo (CNT) for joining the government of Spain, although it also accepted the CNT's tactical autonomy on the matter and defended the policy of anti-fascist unity. After the defeat of the Republicans in the Spanish Civil War, many exiled syndicalists moved to Sweden and joined the SAC. In 1938, the secretariat of the IWA relocated to Stockholm.

During World War II, the grand coalition that governed Sweden introduced a number of emergency measures which restricted workplace organising. The SAC became one of the few opposition forces in Sweden; its protests against the government's appeasement of Nazi Germany made it a target of political repression, which weakened the organisation and caused its membership numbers to dwindle. Members of the SAC, including Arbetaren editor Birger Svahn, were imprisoned or sent to internment camps, the latter of which had been established to separate left-wing radicals from detained military personnel.

=== Post-war revisions ===
Following the conclusion of World War II, anarcho-syndicalist unions throughout Europe experienced a decline, while reformist trade unionism began to see a resurgence. In Sweden, where the anarcho-syndicalist movement hadn't been suppressed by dictatorship or wartime repression, the SAC remained active, making it one of the few IWA affiliates that continued to function. The Swedish state was also developing into a social democracy, with a comprehensive system of welfare and collective bargaining, in which trade unions themselves were tasked with administering social benefits.

Although the SAC had earned moral recognition for its opposition to Nazism during the war, its relevance as a workers' organisation was diminishing. From 1945 to 1957, its membership numbers declined from 22,000 to 16,000. Moderate syndicalists within the SAC, led by the German emigrant Helmut Rüdiger, believed that if the SAC was to survive as an organisation, then it needed to provide a workable alternative to the LO; they argued that, due to the changes brought by the record years of economic expansion and modernisation, the principles of anarcho-syndicalism needed to be revised. Rüdiger thought that, as the states which anarcho-syndicalists had previously opposed had since been transformed into welfare states, overthrowing the state would also mean abolishing its social programmes. In a challenge to the anarchist "orthodoxy" of anti-statism, he thus proposed that anarcho-syndicalists should act within existing state systems in order to democratise the economy, rather than waiting around for a social revolution. He also expressed support for participation in local government. This "new orientation" (Swedish: nyorientering) increasingly informed the practices of the SAC, as the moderate faction gained more influence during the 1950s.

In order to pursue such reforms to the state structure and bolster its own popularity, the SAC elected to participate in the administration of unemployment benefits in Sweden. In 1952, the SAC membership voted to approve the creation of a syndicalist-administered unemployment insurance fund. Rejecting direct action, they declared their goal to be the establishment of industrial democracy by bringing state and private companies under workers' control. Evert Arvidsson, the editor of Arbetaren, declared the SAC to have renounced the "magic wand of revolution". Instead he announced that the SAC "regards the progressive democratisation of the economy as its primary task... The basic idea consists in gradually transferring economic power from the shareholders to the producers." During this period, while its political platform grew increasingly moderate, the SAC also saw a marked growth in its membership.

The SAC's establishment of unemployment insurance funds resulted in the further deterioration of relations between it and the IWA, which increasingly criticised the SAC as "reformist" and "collaborationist". The IWA secretariat pulled out of Sweden in 1953. The Spanish CNT was particularly critical of the SAC, which it felt was contracting the IWA's founding values, especially after the SAC involved itself in the CNT's internal factional dispute. The CNT called for members of the IWA to reaffirm traditional anarchist principles, to reject any collaboration with the state and to repeal of the IWA's statute of tactical autonomy, a motion which passed at the IWA's 1956 congress. Tensions between the CNT and SAC came to a head at the IWA's 1958 congress, when the SAC withdrew from the international organisation. For its part, the SAC called for the "modernisation" of anarcho-syndicalism by revising its principles to fit post-war material conditions.

=== Contemporary era ===
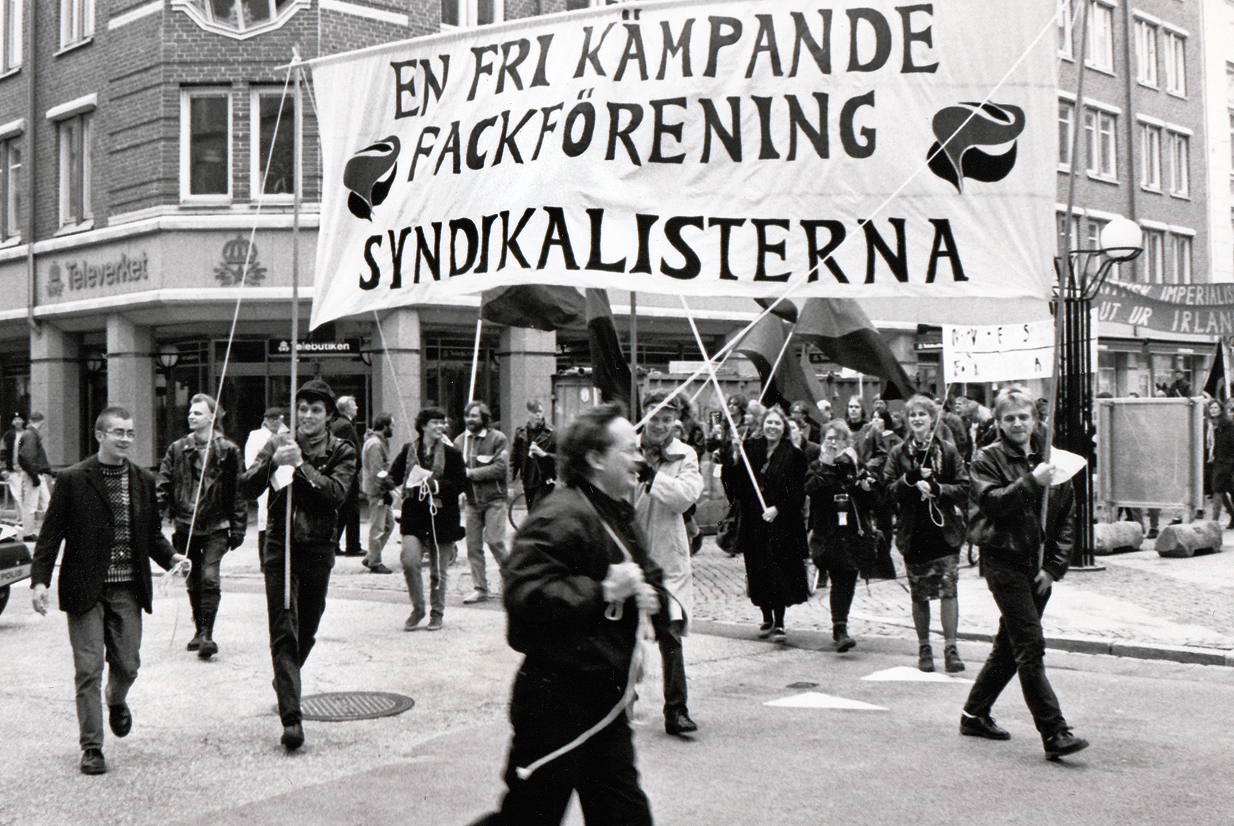
Malmö LS 1 May 1991.

Throughout the 1960s, the SAC saw an increase in its membership numbers, although following the turbulence of the previous decades, it also lacked a coherent ideological programme and its members became concerned that it was facing stagnation. Among other issues, the SAC struggled to find common ground with the counterculture of the 1960s. This trend was reversed by the late 1960s, when a new generation of young activists joined the SAC, which they saw as a means to agitate for left-wing policies. Local federations subsequently reorientated themselves from workplace organising towards broader social campaigns, including environmentalism, feminism and LGBT rights.

In the 1970s, the SAC began to swing back towards far-left politics and reaffirmed some syndicalist principles, although it continued to administer state unemployment benefits. In 1993, the SAC established a youth section, the Swedish Anarcho-syndicalist Youth Federation (SUF). As it remained excluded from the IWA, the SAC also increasingly sought international cooperation with other syndicalist organisations not affiliated with an international. In 2001, the SAC co-founded the International Libertarian Solidarity network, together with other anarcho-syndicalist and anarcho-communist organisations throughout Europe. The following decade, the SAC participated in the establishment of Red and Black Coordination, which brought it together with the British branch of the Industrial Workers of the World (IWW), the French National Confederation of Labour (CNT-F), the Italian Syndicalist Union (USI), the Greek Union of Libertarian Syndicalists (ESE), the Polish Workers' Initiative (IP), and the Spanish General Confederation of Labour (CGT).

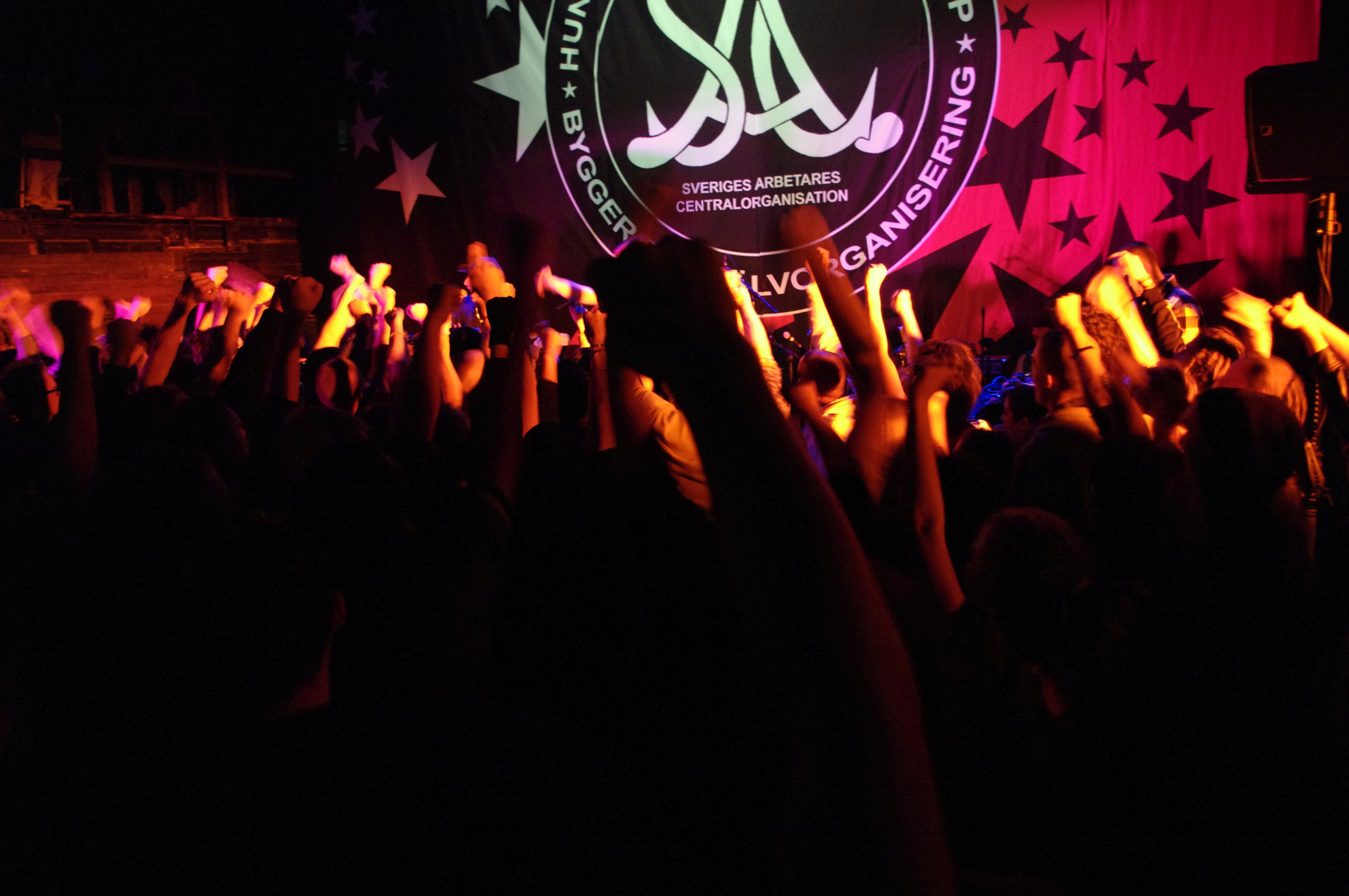
SAC centenary celebration in Stockholm (2010)

Towards the end of the 20th century, the institution of neoliberalism in Sweden damaged the SAC's position within the welfare state. By 2002, the SAC's membership had declined to 7,000 members. By the turn of the 21st century, members of the SAC were growingly increasingly frustrated with the shift in focus away from workplace organising and began campaigning for the SAC to return to its anarcho-syndicalist roots. In 2002, the SAC national congress passed motion to refocus efforts on workplace organising, while also maintaining an intersectional analysis of oppression. It also reorganised itself into a more fluid structure, cutting the number of employed officials and enforcing the regular rotation of its administrative positions. These changes were hotly debated but ultimately resolved, leading to the consolidation of a new direction for the SAC. The SAC continued to face a declining membership, which fell to 5,500 in 2012, but its membership also saw an increased representation of women and young people. The restructuring also highlighted the SAC's urban-rural divide, as it caused a resurgence of activism in the urban centres of Gothenburg, Malmö and Stockholm, while local federations in small towns and rural areas faced difficulties adapting to the organisational changes.

Since its centenary in 2010, the SAC has been credited as the only anarcho-syndicalist organisation to have carried out uninterrupted activity for more than a century. In September 2012, it held its 13th congress in Gävle, where it prepared for its second century of organisation. Gabriel Kuhn highlighted its internal reorganisation, its urban-rural divide and the resumption of international cooperation as the main challenges facing the SAC in its second century.

== Campaigns ==
=== Anti-fascism ===
Since the 1990s, the rise of far-right politics in Sweden has threatened members of the SAC. On 12 October 1999, SAC member Björn Söderberg was murdered for protesting a far-right activist's election to the board of the local social democratic trade union at the warehouse they were working at. The attack provoked mass anti-fascist demonstrations throughout Sweden and a crackdown on far-right extremists, with broad support from Swedish society. Despite the crackdown, far-right attacks against the SAC persisted. In 2008, two members of the SAC and their infant daughter narrowly escaped an arson attack against their home. In commemoration of Söderberg, the SAC holds an annual memorial event and awards a Civil Courage Prize (Swedish: Civilkuragepriset).

=== Critique of corporate globalisation ===
The SAC coordinated political demonstrations against the 2001 European Council meeting in Gothenburg, during which violent clashes broke out between police and demonstrators.

=== Organising undocumented workers ===
In 2004, the Stockholm local federation of the SAC established an Undocumented Group (Swedish: Papperslésasgruppen), which was tasked with organising migrant workers without work permits, many of whom have immigrated to Sweden from Latin America since the 1970s. The founding meeting was held in the building of the Workers' Education Association (Swedish: Arbetarnas bildningsförbund; ABF) and attended by 100 people, half of whom were undocumented workers, with Latin American organisers taking charge of the meeting. The SAC's attempts to organise undocumented workers were opposed by members of the LO and the Left Party, who accused the SAC of undercutting the wages of native Swedes. To agitate for fair wages for migrant workers in the service industry, who worked long hours for low wages in a hostile work environment, the SAC opted for its "register method" (Swedish: registermetod); the union itself decided a minimum wage, without collective bargaining, and any employers who refused were picketed.

The breakthrough campaign for the SAC's undocumented workers' union came in 2007, when one of their members had their wages withheld by their employers at the South Asian restaurant they worked in. After negotiations failed, the SAC picketed the restaurant, securing payment of the unpaid wages after seven weeks. In the wake of this campaign, many business owners complied with the SAC's demands rather than face similar campaigns. The following year, SAC members began protesting against poor working conditions and unpaid wages at an up-market restaurant in Djurgården. After thousands of participants at the 2009 International Workers Day demonstration pledged to join the campaign, the employer compensated the workers by $30,000 (equivalent to $45,021 in 2025). When cleaners at the Berns complex were denied their wages, a one-day SAC picket managed to resolve the issue, but after it was discovered that the Berns employers had illegally blacklisted syndicalists from employment, the SAC resumed its campaign against them. Events at the Berns were cancelled or boycotted, while members of the SAC emptied trash outside its doors, provoking outrage from conservative politicians and press, who compared the SAC to a gang.

The organising of undocumented workers gave a boost to the SAC, as migrant workers rose to official positions within the union and its other members were energised by the campaigns. The initiative quickly spread from Stockholm to Malmö, where picket lines became the scene of violent clashes between striking workers and police. 26 protestors were arrested and ultimately found guilty of disobeying the police, for which they were fined thousands of Swedish crowns.

== Organisation ==
The SAC is a decentralised organisation, in which its sections have a large amount of autonomy and are federatively-linked together within the SAC. The SAC has two types of constituent section: geographic- and branch-level organisations.

The base geographic unit of the SAC is the local federation (Swedish: Lokal Samorganisation; LS), which brings together workers in a given municipality to coordinate their workplace struggles. Local federations are grouped together based on district, in which they share infrastructure, provide mutual aid and organise campaigns. Each elect their own delegates to nationwide meetings of the SAC. As of 2014, the SAC counted around 50 local federations throughout Sweden, the largest of which is in Stockholm, which counts roughly 1,000 members.

The base branch unit of the SAC are shop branches, which organise workers within the same workplace, irrespective of their trade. Shop branches are grouped together into union branches, which unite workplace branches that work in the same industry. Union branches are finally united into national federations, which group together all union branches in their industry.

The central body of the SAC is its Executive Committee (Swedish: Arbetsutskott; AU), which consists of seven members that meet on a bi-weekly basis to handle administrative tasks. Members of the AU are elected by the SAC's national congress, which brings together delegates representing each local federation, as well as proportional representation for each 100 members. Alongside wage workers, the SAC also allows the unemployed, students and pensioners to join its ranks.

== Ideology ==
The SAC is a syndicalist organisation, which was founded on anti-capitalist and socialist principles. Membership of the SAC is open to all workers, regardless of their ideology, although many of its members have identified with libertarian socialism or anarchism. The SAC favours direct action, rather than just negotiating with employers. The SAC aims to provide a more democratic and self-organised alternative to the Swedish Trade Union Confederation (LO), the country's largest trade union centre.

== Notable members ==
- Stig Dagerman
- Jan Fridegård
- Folke Fridell
- Britta Gröndahl
- Elise Ottesen-Jensen

== See also ==
- Anarchism in Sweden
- General Confederation of Labour (Spain)

== Bibliography ==
- Damier, Vadim (2009) [2000]. Anarcho-syndicalism in the 20th Century. Translated by Archibald, Malcolm. Edmonton: Black Cat Press. ISBN 978-0-9737827-6-9.
- Kuhn, Gabriel (2014). "Syndicalism in Sweden: A Hundred Years of the SAC". In Ness, Immanuel (ed.). New Forms of Worker Organization: The Syndicalist and Autonomist Restoration of Class-Struggle Unionism. PM Press. pp. 168–183. ISBN 978-1-60486-956-9.
- Persson, Lennart K. (1990). "Revolutionary Syndicalism in Sweden before the Second World War". In van der Linden, Marcel; Thorpe, Wayne (eds.). Revolutionary Syndicalism: An International Perspective. Gower Publishing. pp. 81–99. ISBN 0-85967-815-6.
- van der Walt, Lucien; Schmidt, Michael (2009). Black Flame: The Revolutionary Class Politics of Anarchism and Syndicalism. Edinburgh: AK Press. ISBN 978-1-904859-16-1. LCCN 2006933558. OCLC 1100238201.
