= Syndikalistiska Arbetarefederationen =

SAF
- Syndicalist Workers Federation
- Syndikalistiska Arbetarefederationen
- Merged into: Central Organisation of Swedish Workers
- Formation: 26 October 1928; 98 years ago
- Dissolved: 1 January 1938; 88 years ago
- Type: Trade union federation
- Location: Sweden
- Members: 3,000 (c. 1935)
- Leader: P.J. Welinder
- Publication: Arbetarekuriren

The Syndicalist Workers' Federation (Swedish: Syndikalistiska Arbetarefederationen; SAF) was a Swedish anarcho-syndicalist trade union centre from 1928 to 1938.

== Split in SAC ==
The formation of the SAF had been preceded by a conflict in the syndicalist trade union centre, the Central Organisation of Swedish Workers (Swedish: Sveriges Arbetares Centralorganisation; SAC). Within the SAC an oppositional tendency had emerged, centred around the newspaper Arbetarekuriren (Worker's Courier), which began publishing in October 1926. In 1925, P.J. Welinder, who had served as acting general secretary of the Industrial Workers of the World (IWW), returned to Sweden. In 1926, Welinder was employed as an agitator for 4 coordinated SAC districts (Gothenburg, Skåne, Västergötland-Halland and West Småland-Halland) and as editor for Arbetarekuriren. Welinder carried out an extensive agitation (holding 145 public meetings in 1926 alone), and in this process Welinder emerged as the key leader of the oppositional tendency with SAC.

The SAC opposition was primarily based in the 4 coordinated districts, with some presence in other regions such as parts of Hälsingland. It was mainly concerned with tactical questions. The opposition was frustrated by long strikes that demanded significant fundraising to be sustained, as well as concerns over the costs of maintaining the central SAC bureaucratic apparatus. SAC central propaganda sought to prevent the split but a number of SAC Local Federations in western Sweden, including the sizeable Gothenburg Local Federation, broke away from the SAC during 1926–1927. The dissident Local Federations had an anarcho-syndicalist orientation. The dissident Local Federations formed the Syndicalist Workers' Federation (Swedish: Syndikalistiska Arbetarefederationen; SAF) at its founding congress in Gothenburg, on 26–28 October 1928. The SAF endorsed the declaration of principles of the Industrial Workers of the World (IWW). The organisation's main leader was P. J. Welinder.

== SAF programme ==
The SAF programme was largely similar to that of the 1910 SAC programme, albeit some parts were more drawn from the IWW. The SAF rejected the SAC as overly centralized and bureaucratic, and the SAF disagreed with the move of the SAC towards fixed-term collective bargaining agreements. The SAF saw such agreements as compromises with capitalists, and instead reaffirmed its commitment to direct action tactics. The SAF stressed the importance of organizing the poorest workers to retain the revolutionary character of the movement and keeping membership fees low. The SAF retained the Local Federation (lokal samorganisation) structures of the SAC and would form industrial sections where feasible, but stressed that Local Federations would have autonomy over decision-making. The SAF rejected the formation of centralized industrial departments.

== Growth and decline ==
For a relatively small organisation, the SAF carried out significant propaganda activities, largely thanks to Welinder's capacities as a public speaker and writer. But the launch of the new organisation was soon followed by the Great Depression, and the economic hardship and unemployment that followed made recruitment to the SAF difficult. According to Lennart K. Persson, the SAF would have had around 1,000 members at the time of its foundation and around 3,000 by the mid-1930s. At its peak, the SAF had some 50 Local Federations mainly in the southern and western parts of the country, plus a handful of Local Federations in the north. The organisation was dominated by its Gothenburg Local Federation, which had some 500 members by the early 1930s. The main sectors represented in the SAF were construction workers, followed by coal miners and forestry workers.

The SAF published Arbetarekuriren as a weekly newspaper. Whilst the SAF had sought to keep membership dues lower than other trade unions, the SAF had the most frequent levy-rising activities for its newspaper of all labour unions in Gothenburg. Between two and four times a year, SAF members had to pay levies to keep Arbetarekuriren afloat.

Formally speaking, the SAF had to disband following a litigation arising from an intense industrial conflict, and a supposedly new organisation was formally constituted as the 'New Syndicalist Workers Federation'.

== Reunification with SAC ==
Following the split, the SAC took several initiatives towards a reunification with the SAF. In 1929, a SAF delegation was invited to the SAC congress. Discussions on unification took place, but Welinder resisted a merger. After Welinder's death in 1934, merger talks resumed, but only by 1 January 1938 did the SAF merge back into the SAC.

Folke Fridell, the famous proletarian writer, was also a notable member of the SAF.

== Bibliography ==
- Andersson, John (1936). Syndikalismen: teori, mål, historia, taktik och organisationsformer (in Swedish). Federativs Förlag. p. 112.
- Bergkvist, Karl; Arvidsson, Evert (1960). SAC 1910-1960: jubileumskrift (in Swedish). Federativs förlag. p. 95.
- Blomberg, Eva (1995). Män i mörker: arbetsgivare, reformister och syndikalister: politik och identitet i svensk gruvindustri 1910-1940 (in Swedish). Stockholm University. p. 176. ISBN 9789122016892.
- Engblom, Lars-Åke (1980). Arbetarpressen i Göteborg: en studie av arbetarpressens förutsättningar, arbetarrörelsens presspolitik och tidningskonkurrensen i Göteborg 1890-1965 (in Swedish). University of Gothenburg. pp. 60, 87, 163. ISBN 9789185196197.
- Erfurth, Sonja (1987). Harry Martinson och Moa, 1920-1931 (in Swedish). Bonniers. p. 76. ISBN 9789100470616.
- Persson, Lennart K. (1990). "Revolutionary Syndicalism in Sweden before the Second World War". In van der Linden, Marcel; Thorpe, Wayne (eds.). Revolutionary Syndicalism: An International Perspective. Scolar Press. pp. 81–100. ISBN 0-85967-815-6.
