= Storsien =

Coordinates: 66°02′N 23°03′E

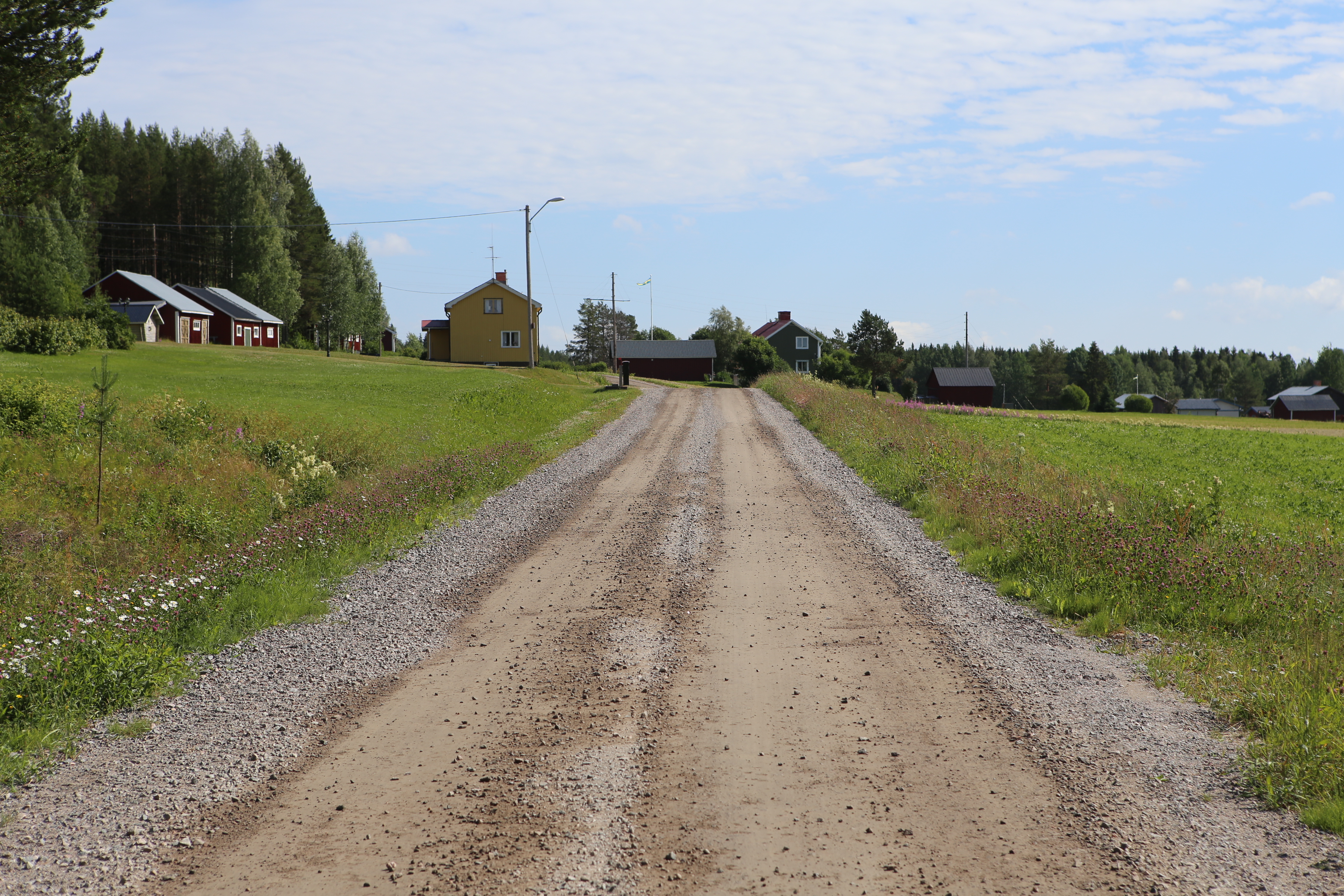
The village Storsien in 2014.

Storsien is a small village in Kalix Municipality in northern Sweden. It is best known for the internment camp located there where about 300–370 communists and pacifists were held during the winter of 1939–1940.

The village was founded in 1798 and grew to its maximum size at the end of the 1940s with about 80 inhabitants. Today it consists of thirteen farms with a total of about twenty-five people. Mail service, with one delivery per week, was started in early 1900. Telephones were installed in 1927, and electricity in 1941.
