= Brand (magazine) =

Swedish anarchist magazine

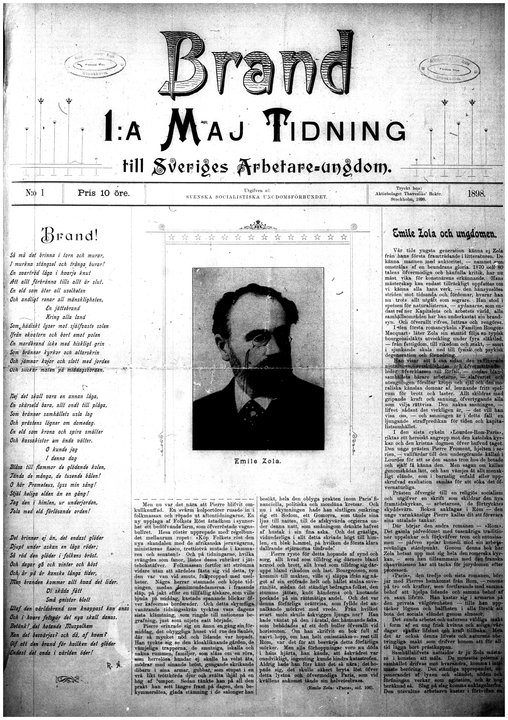
- First issue cover
- Categories: Anarchist magazine
- Founded: 1898
- Country: Sweden
- Based in: Stockholm
- Language: Swedish
- Website: www.tidningenbrand.se
- ISSN: 0284-9526

Brand (Swedish: Fire) is a Swedish anarchist and left-wing magazine founded in 1898. Originally, it was run by the Young Socialists, the youth section of the Swedish Social Democratic Party. Since the 1950s, it is not affiliated with any political organization.

== Legal and political persecution ==
Brand has been in trouble with the police. The first case was in 1906 and was due to the laws enacted by Karl Staaff that made it illegal to promote pacifism. The laws were known as Staaflagarna (the Staff laws) or Lex Hinke (after Hinke Bergegren) who served ten months for breaking the law. In 1908 Einar Håkansson was accused of blasphemy for an article he published in Brand, but he died before it was possible to charge him. In 1910 Hinke Bergegren was sent to jail for two months due to an article series on birth control and the brochure Kärlek utan barn (Love without children) on the same subject. He was acquitted three times in Stockholm until he was sentenced in Gothenburg. In 1916 the then editor of Brand Ivan Oljelund was arrested for promoting pacifism, i.e. for violation of the Staaf laws. Oljelund was sentenced to 18 months of hard labor, but the sentence was later reduced to 15 months and then to 8 months when it was appealed. During his time at Långholmen Prison the magazine was edited by C J Björklund.

On 19 June 1999 Hans Regner charged the magazine with sedition due to an article on female self-defense. The charge was later dismissed. On 31 August 2000 Brand was charged again. This time for sedition following a humoristic article on how to make your riot a success.

== Contributors ==
Several notable people have written for Brand, examples are Gustav Hedenvind-Eriksson, Hinke Bergegren (editor 1904-1911), Ivan Oljelund, Moa Martinson (as Helga Johansson), Harry Martinson, C.J. Björklund, Carl-Emil Englund, Erik Asklund, Eyvind Johnson, Jan Fridegård, Ivar Lo Johansson, Artur Lundkvist, Vilhelm Moberg, Albert Jensen, Elise Ottesen-Jensen, Nils Ferlin, Helmer Grundström and Eva X Moberg.
