= Arbetaren =

Swedish syndicalist newspaper

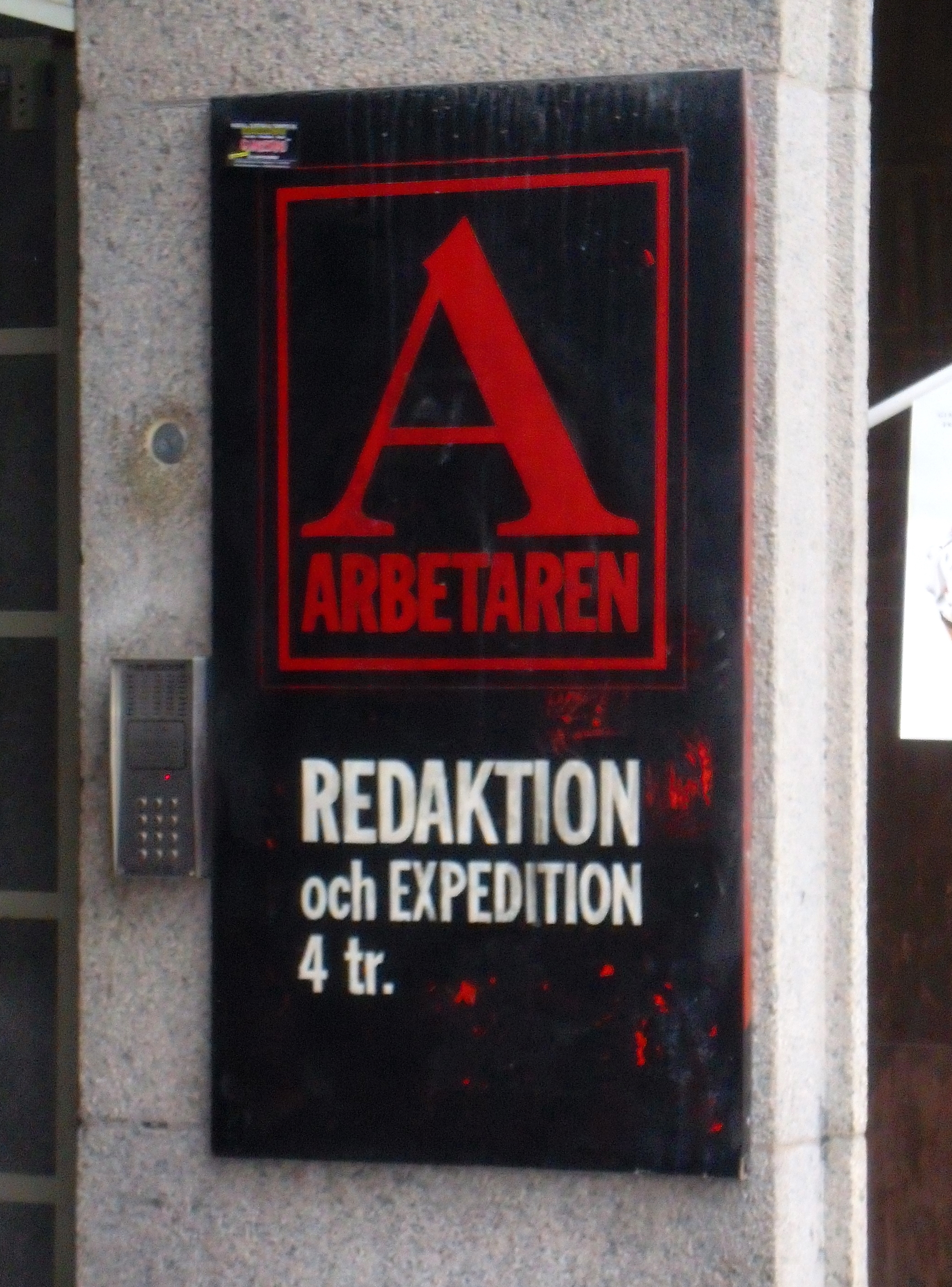
Arbetarens redaktionsskylt

Arbetaren (English: The Worker) is a Swedish syndicalist newspaper. Founded in 1922, it has been published by the Central Organisation of Swedish Workers (SAC), an anarcho-syndicalist trade union federation, first as a daily newspaper, then as a weekly magazine since 1958. The editor-in-chief of Arbetaren sits on the administrative body of the SAC.

During World War II, Arbetaren came under sustained political repression by the Swedish government. Although it was never formally banned, its issues were frequently seized by police immediately after publication. According to Gabriel Kuhn, it was the "most confiscated Swedish journal during World War II". Its editor-in-chief, Birger Svahn, was detained in an internment camps during the war.

As of 2013, the paper had a circulation of 2,500. The following year, Gabriel Kuhn reported its circulation to be 3,500 copies.

== Bibliography ==
- Kuhn, Gabriel (2014). "Syndicalism in Sweden: A Hundred Years of the SAC". In Ness, Immanuel (ed.). New Forms of Worker Organization: The Syndicalist and Autonomist Restoration of Class-Struggle Unionism. PM Press. pp. 168–183. ISBN 978-1-60486-956-9.
