= Gabriel Kuhn =

Swedish writer (born 1972)

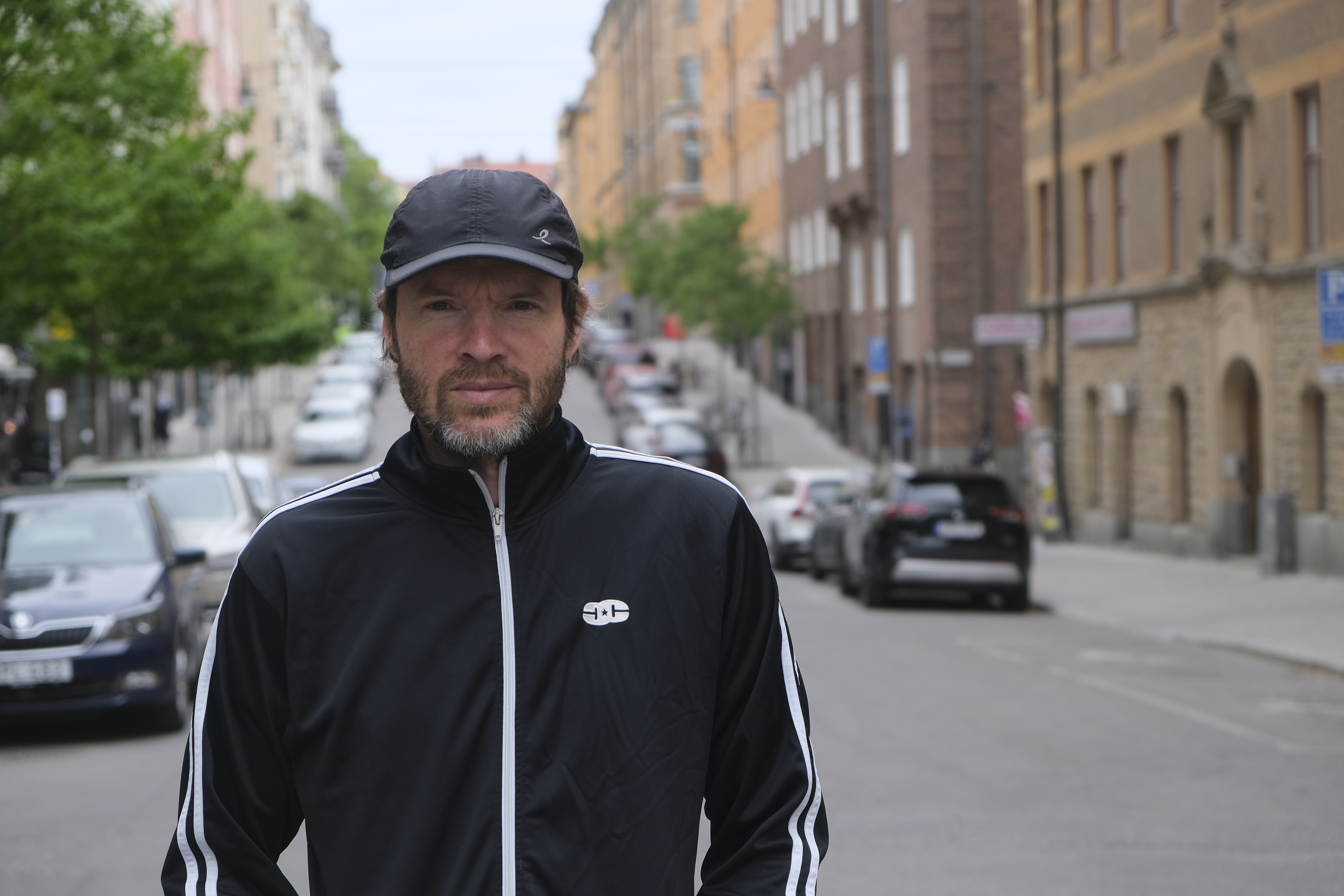

General Secretary of the Central Organisation of Swedish Workers
- Incumbent
- Assumed office 1 June 2023
- Preceded by: Erik Bonk

Personal details
- Born: 12 February 1972 (age 54) Innsbruck, Austria
- Education: University of Innsbruck
- Occupation: Writer, translator

Gabriel Kuhn (born 1972) is a political writer and translator based in Sweden.

== Biography ==
Kuhn became straight edge and active in radical circles as a teenager.

Following post-secondary studies in Austria and the United States, Kuhn lived in the Middle East and the South Pacific Islands.

Since 2005, Kuhn has lived in Sweden. Kuhn holds a PhD in philosophy with a speciality in poststructuralism. His thinking has been influenced by classical anarchism and Anglo-American Cultural Studies. The key focus of Kuhn's political activity has been on bridging the gap between theory and practice. Kuhn's conception of community is one based on solidarity with oppressed peoples. Alongside his political and social involvement, Kuhn has in the past played soccer semi-professionally.

In 2010, Kuhn was forced to cancel a three-month speaking tour of the United States after being denied authorization to travel by US authorities. Kuhn believes he had been placed on the "No Fly List."

== Work ==
Kuhn has been politically active since 1989, and his written work, developed in that context, is directed towards left-wing activists and scholars. In the 1990s, he worked with the Austrian autonomist journal TATblatt and the Vienna anarchist publisher Monte Verita. Kuhn founded Alpine Anarchist Productions (AAP) in 2000.

His annotated anthology of contemporary American anarchism, translated into German, Neuer Anarchismus in den USA. Seattle und die Folgen (2008), was named "Book of the Year" by Berlin's Bibliothek der Freien.

In June 2023, Kuhn became general secretary of the syndicalist labor union SAC Syndikalisterna.

== Selected bibliography ==
- Women Pirates and the Politics of the Jolly Roger. With Ulrike Klausmann und Marion Meinzerin. BlackRose, Montreal 1997 ISBN 978-1-55164-059-4 TB ISBN 978-1-55164-058-7
- Prison Round Trip by Klaus Viehmann. Translator. PM Press & Kersplebedeb, Oakland & Montreal 2009 ISBN 978-1-60486-082-5
- Life Under the Jolly Roger: Reflections on Golden Age Piracy. PM Press, Oakland 2010 ISBN 978-1-60486-052-8
- Sober Living for the Revolution: Hardcore Punk, Straight Edge, and Radical Politics. Editor. PM Press, Oakland 2010 ISBN 978-1-60486-051-1
- Gustav Landauer: Revolution and Other Writings. Editor and translator. PM Press, Oakland 2010 ISBN 978-1-60486-054-2
- Erich Mühsam: Liberating Society from the State and Other Writings. Editor and translator. PM Press, Oakland 2011 ISBN 978-1-60486-055-9
- Soccer vs. the State: Tackling Football and Radical Politics. PM Press, Oakland 2011 ISBN 978-1-60486-053-5
- All Power to the Councils! A Documentary History of the German Revolution of 1918–1919. Editor and translator. PM Press, Oakland 2012 ISBN 978-1-60486-111-2
- Turning Money into Rebellion: The Unlikely Story of Denmark's Revolutionary Bank Robbers. Editor. PM Press & Kersplebedeb, Oakland & Montreal 2014 ISBN 978-1-60486-316-1
- Playing as if the World Mattered: An Illustrated History of Activism in Sports. PM Press, Oakland 2015 ISBN 978-1-62963-097-7
- Antifascism, Sports, Sobriety: Forging a Militant Working-Class Culture. Selected Writings by Julius Deutsch. Editor and Translator. PM Press, Oakland 2017 ISBN 978-1-62963-154-7
- X: Straight Edge and Radical Sobriety. Editor. PM Press, Oakland 2019 ISBN 978-1-62963-716-7
- Liberating Sápmi: Indigenous Resistance in Europe's Far North. PM Press, Oakland 2020 ISBN 978-1-62963-712-9
- From Hash Rebels to Urban Guerrillas: A Documentary History of the 2nd of June Movement. Editor, with Roman Danyluk. PM Press & Kersplebedeb, Oakland & Montreal 2024 ISBN 979-8-88744-061-3
