= Hinke Bergegren =

Swedish politician

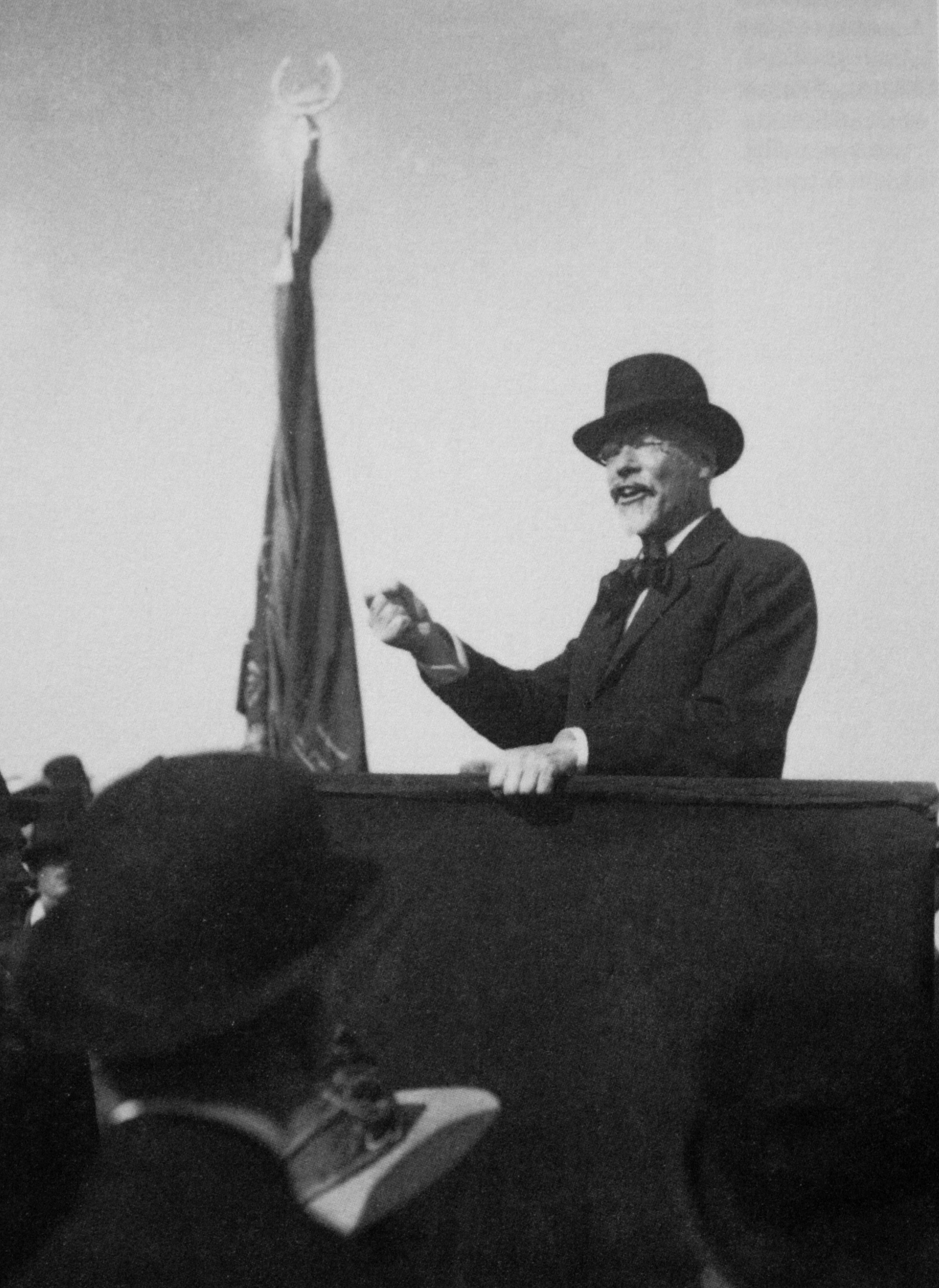
- Bergegren in 1908
- Born: 22 April 1861
- Died: 10 May 1936 (aged 75)
- Occupation: Politician
- Known for: Contraceptive and reproductive rights activism in Sweden
- Spouse: Anna Kajsa Gustafsson

Henrik "Hinke" Bergegren (1861–1936) was a Swedish socialist, anarchist, writer, and agitator. He was one of Sweden's most influential early anarchists.

== Early life ==
Bergegren was born on 22 April 1861 in Kungsholmen, Stockholm to bookseller Evald Teodor Bergegren and Karolina Hildlberg. He worked as a journalist and editor, going on to be hired as an editorial secretary by Hjalmar Branting at The Social Democrat.

== Political life ==
Bergegren was a leading figure in the Social Democratic party, a figurehead of its anarcho-syndaclist element. Bergegren was active in the Swedish labour movement, supporting striking industrial workers during the 1909 Swedish general strike. Bergegren supported direct action and in a speech at the second SAP Congress in 1891, he argued that social democrats should be prepared for "any violence whatsoever" and that this involved teaching "workers how to manufacture and use dynamite and daggers." Bergegren was fined for publicly declaring: “If the officers use violence against us, we will use the same means against them”. His solidarity work also extended to sheltering refugees at his villa in Agneberg. Bergegren's radicalism attracted support among the party's Youth League who gathered around him. As the party leadership moved to the right, Bergegren was expelled, although his revolutionary activism received continued admiration from younger socialists. Bergegren later turned to support Bolshevism.

=== Contraceptive and reproductive rights advocacy ===
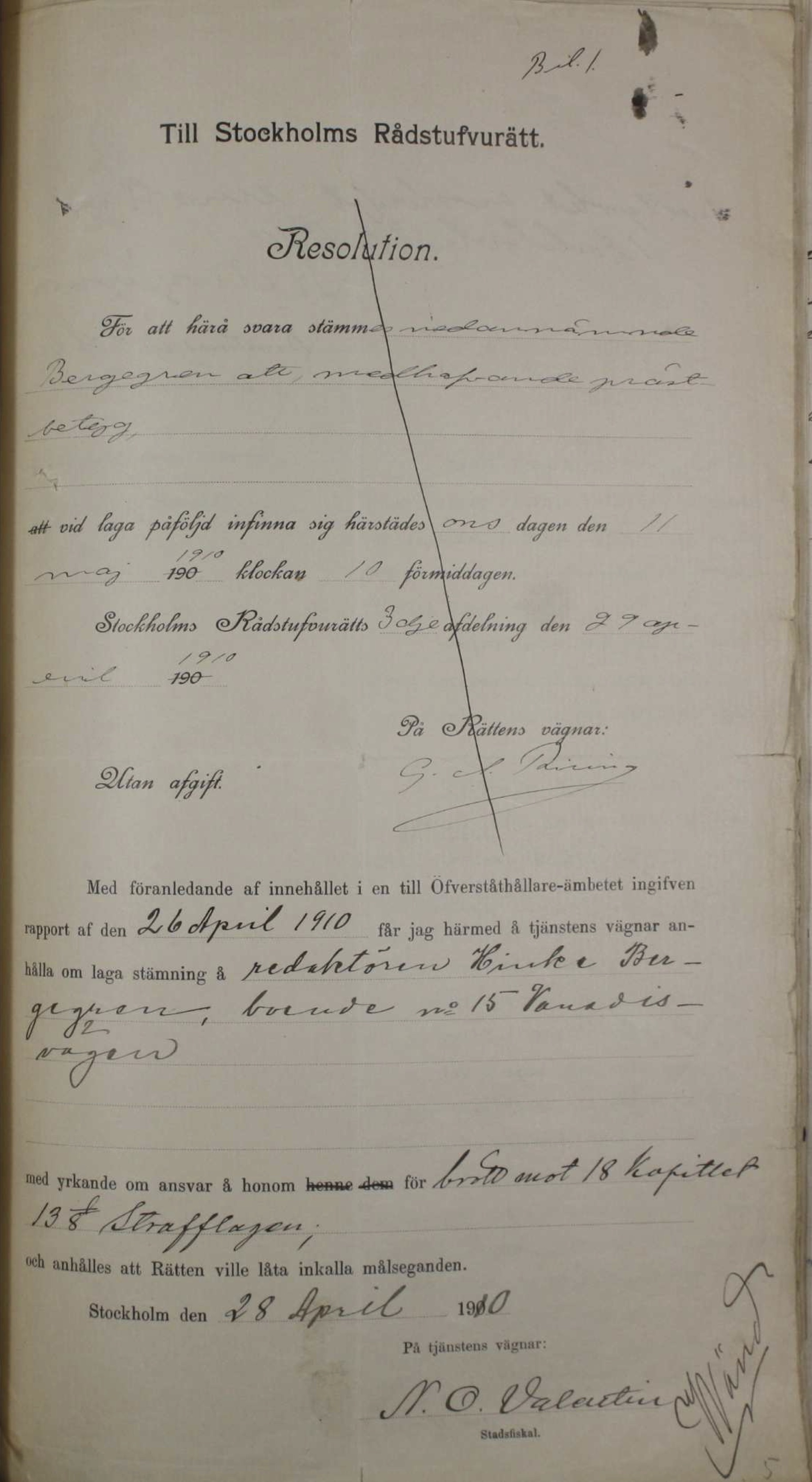
Record of Bergegren's arrest.

Bergegren has been described as a "pioneer propagandist" for contraception. After Bergegren gave a speech promoting birth control in 1910, the Swedish government criminalised advocating for birth control.

Bergegren's support for reproductive rights and contraceptive access was affected by seeing urban poverty in Hagalund. He gave a lecture titled Kärlek utan barn (Love without children) in Stockholm on 7 April 1910.

"My wish is that all unmarried mothers have the same legal protection as other mothers, that the law against the removal of a fetus should be considerate and mild. But I stress, better than the removal of a fetus is to use contraceptives. The unmarried woman who does not have a home or bread for a child should be protected against the consequences of her actions. This is better than, through tears and regret, placing a child into a difficult, unmerciful life. We must speak loudly about the preventive methods that exist."

The conservative newspaper Nya Dagligt Allehanda was outraged by Bergegren's speech and in an article published on 16 April 1910 the paper described it as "nasty propaganda". Despite being outlawed, Bergegren continued to lecture in support of contraception and reproductive autonomy; more than 50,000 copies of his lectures were printed and sold across Sweden. Bergegren was prosecuted and jailed for his active support for contraception on multiple occasions.

== Personal life ==
Bergegren was married to Anna Kajsa Gustafsson (1857–1934) in 1886 at the age of 26, they had no children.
