= Outline of anarchism =

Overview of and topical guide to anarchism

The following outline is provided as an overview of and topical guide to anarchism:

== Nature ==
- Supports
  - Anarchy
  - Autonomy
  - Civil liberties
  - Classless society
  - Cooperation
  - Direct action
  - Egalitarianism
  - Free association of producers
  - Lawlessness
  - Mutual aid
  - Prefiguration
  - Stateless society
  - Self-governance
  - Voluntary association
  - Workers' self-management
- Rejects
  - Authoritarianism
  - Capitalism
  - Censorship
  - Centrally planned economy
  - Coercion
  - Discrimination
  - Government
  - Hierarchy
  - Imperialism
  - Organized religion
  - Paternalism
  - Patriarchy
  - State
  - Supremacism
  - Totalitarianism

== Schools of thought ==
=== Classical ===
- Mutualism
- Individualist anarchism
  - Philosophical anarchism
  - Egoist anarchism
    - Illegalism
- Social anarchism
  - Collectivist anarchism
  - Anarchist communism
    - Magonism

=== Post-classical ===
- Anarcha-feminism
- Green anarchism
  - Anarcho-primitivism
  - Social ecology
- Anarcho-pacifism
- Insurrectionary anarchism
- Religious anarchism
  - Buddhist anarchism
  - Christian anarchism
  - Jewish anarchism
- Anarchism without adjectives

=== Contemporary ===
- Black anarchism
- Crypto-anarchism
- Market anarchism
- Postcolonial anarchism
- Post-anarchism
- Post-left anarchy
- Queer anarchism
- Anarcho-transhumanism

=== Organizational forms ===
- Platformism
- Anarchist synthesis
- Anarcho-syndicalism

== History ==
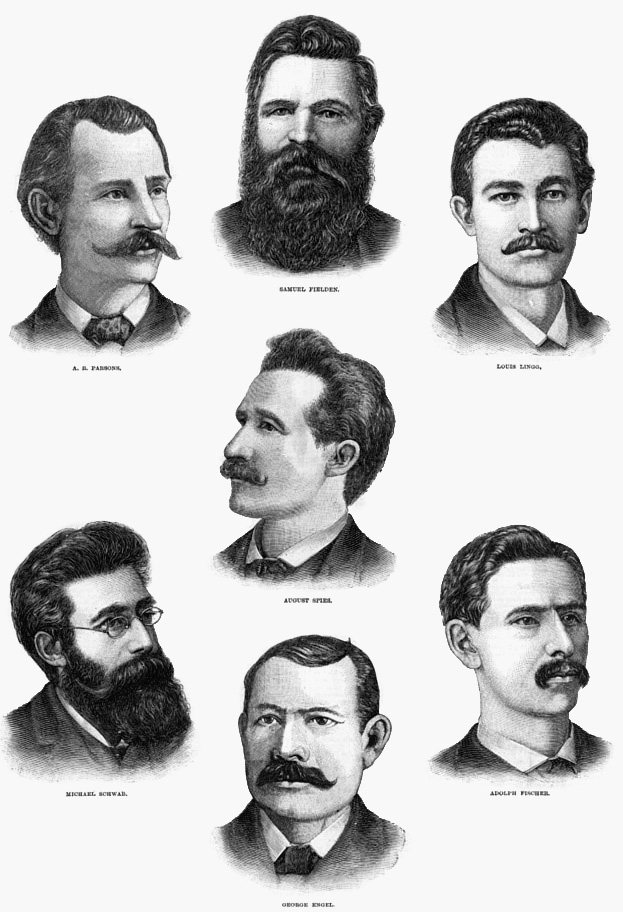
The execution of the Haymarket martyrs following the Haymarket affair of 1886 inspired a new generation of anarchists

=== Timeline of major events ===
Historic precedents and background events (pre-1840)

- 1793 – William Godwin publishes Enquiry Concerning Political Justice, implicitly establishing the philosophical foundations of anarchism.
- 1827 – Josiah Warren opens the Cincinnati Time Store, an early experiment in mutualist economics.

Early stages (1840–1870)

- 1840 – Pierre-Joseph Proudhon publishes What Is Property? and becomes history's first self-proclaimed anarchist.
- 1844 – The Ego and Its Own published by Max Stirner.
- 1845 – Ramón de la Sagra founds the first anarchist journal in Spain.
- 1850 – Anarchist Manifesto published by Anselme Bellegarrigue.
- 1864 – International Workingmen's Association (IWA) founded.
- 1867–69 – Julio López Chávez revolt in Mexico.

Classical era (1870–1913)

- 1870–71 – Paris Commune, Lyon Commune and Besançon Commune in France.
- 1872 – Hague Congress in the Netherlands.
- 1872 – St. Imier Congress in Switzerland.
- 1873–74 – Cantonal rebellion and Petroleum Revolution in Spain.
- 1874 – Bologna insurrection in Italy.
- 1877 – Matese insurrection in Italy.
- 1878 – Assassination attempt against Kaiser Wilhelm I by Max Hödel.
- 1882–83 – Mano Negra affair in Spain.
- 1886 – Strike of 1886 in Belgium.
- 1886 – Haymarket affair in the US. Leads to International Workers' Day/May Day.
- 1891 – Clichy Affair in France.
- 1892 – The Conquest of Bread by Peter Kropotkin is published.
- 1892 – Jerez uprising in Spain.
- 1892 – Walsall Anarchists in Britain.
- 1893 – Liceu bombing in Spain.
- 1894 – Lunigiana revolt in Italy.
- 1894 – Omladina Trial in the Austro-Hungarian empire.
- 1894 – Assassination of French President Sadi Carnot by Sante Geronimo Caserio.
- 1894 – Trial of the Thirty in France.
- 1896 – Barcelona Corpus Christi procession bombing and Montjuïc trial in Spain.
- 1897 – Assassination of Spanish PM Antonio Cánovas del Castillo.
- 1898 – Assassination of Empress Elisabeth of Austria.
- 1900 – Assassination of King Umberto I of Italy.
- 1901 – Assassination of US President William McKinley.
- 1903 – Strandzha Commune in the Ottoman Empire.
- 1903 – Immigration Act of 1903 in the US.
- 1907 – International Anarchist Congress of Amsterdam in the Netherlands.
- 1907 – Tenants' strike in Argentina.
- 1908 – Red Flag Incident in Japan.
- 1909 – Assassination of Chief of Police Ramón Lorenzo Falcón.
- 1909 – Francisco Ferrer executed in Spain.
- 1910–11 – High Treason Incident in Japan.
- 1911 – Magonista rebellion in Mexico.
- 1912 – Assassination of Spanish PM José Canalejas y Méndez.
- 1912–27 – The Diligent Work-Frugal Study Movement in China and France.
- 1913 – Assassination of George I of Greece.

World War I, Interwar period and World War II (1914 – 1945)

- 1916 – Manifesto of the Sixteen published.
- 1916 – Serifos miners strike in Greece.
- 1917–21 – the Makhnovshchina is active in Ukraine.
- 1918–20 – Constitution Protection Region of Southern Fujian in China.
- 1918 – Explosion in Leontievsky Lane in Russia.
- 1918 – First Republic of Pińczów established in Poland.
- 1918 – Rio de Janeiro anarchist insurrection in Brazil.
- 1919 – Tragic Week in Argentina.
- 1919 – La Canadenca strike in Spain.
- 1919 – United States anarchist bombings.
- 1919–20 – First Red Scare and Palmer Raids in the US.
- 1919–20 – Biennio Rosso in Italy.
- 1920–22 – Patagonia Rebelde and La Forestal massacre in Argentina.
- 1920 – Wall Street bombing in the US.
- 1921 – Assassination of Spanish PM Eduardo Dato.
- 1923 – Kantō Massacre and Amakasu Incident in Japan.
- 1926 – Gino Lucetti attempts to assassinate Benito Mussolini in Italy.
- 1926–28 – Severino Di Giovanni bombing campaign in Argentina.
- 1927 – Sacco and Vanzetti executed in the US.
- 1929–31 – Korean People's Association in Manchuria in China.
- 1931 – Taking of Encarnación in Paraguay.
- 1932 – Alt Llobregat insurrection in Spain.
- 1933 – Anarchist insurrection of January 1933 and Casas Viejas incident in Spain.
- 1933 – Anarchist insurrection of December 1933 in Spain.
- 1934 – Erich Mühsam murdered in a Nazi concentration camp.
- 1934 – Asturian miners' strike of 1934 in Spain.
- 1936–39 – the Spanish Civil War and Spanish Revolution.
- 1937 – May Days in Spain.
- 1943 – Carlo Tresca assassinated in the US.

Cold War era (1946 – 1989)

- 1955 – Pierre Morain becomes the first French activist jailed for supporting Algerian independence.
- 1968 – May 68 in France.
- 1969 – Piazza Fontana bombing and death of Giuseppe Pinelli in Italy.
- 1970 – Barracks anarchists killed in Italy.
- 1971 – Chomsky–Foucault debate the Netherlands.
- 1978 – Scala case in Spain.
- 1980 – Faurisson affair in France.
- 1980 – Wanganui Computer Centre bombing in New Zealand.
- 1982 – Litton Industries bombing in Canada.
- 1986 – Battle of Ryesgade in Denmark.

Post-Cold War era resurgence (1990 – present)

- 1994–2020 – Zapatista uprising and Chiapas conflict in Mexico.
- 1999 – Murder of Björn Söderberg in Sweden.
- 1999 – Seattle WTO protests in the US.
- 2001 – Katie Sierra free speech case in the US.
- 2006 – 4F case in Spain.
- 2008 – Tarnac Nine arrested in France.
- 2008 – Greek riots.
- 2011 – Occupy movement begins.
- 2012 – Rojava conflict begins.
- 2016 – Audrey Tang appointed Minister without portfolio in Taiwan.
- 2017 – Catalan general strike in Spain.
- 2018 – Arkhangelsk FSB office bombing in Russia.
- 2019 – Tacoma attack in the US.
- 2023 – Killing of Tortuguita in the US.
- 2024 – Self-immolation of Aaron Bushnell in the US.

=== History by region ===
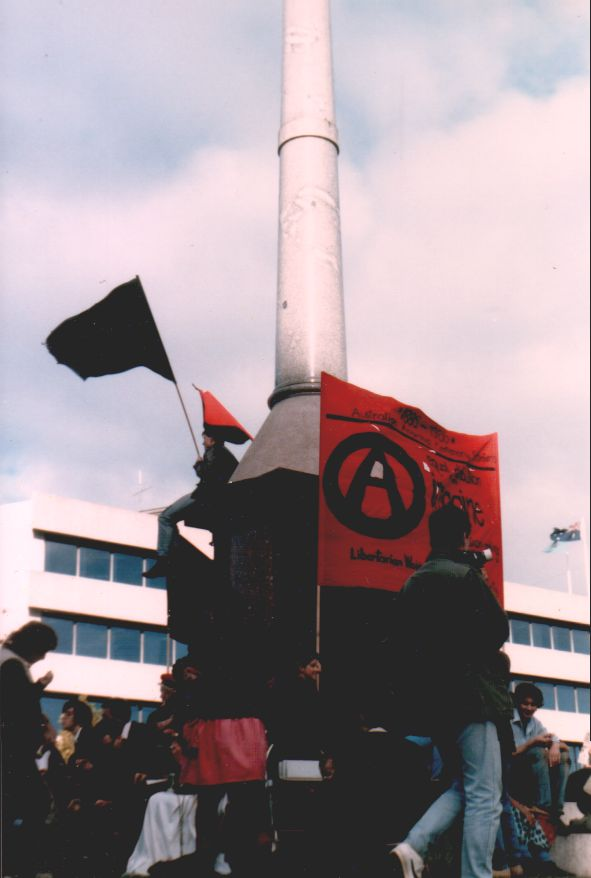
Australian Anarchist Centenary Celebrations on 1 May 1986 at the Melbourne Eight Hour Day monument

- Anarchism in Africa
  - Anarchism in Algeria
  - Anarchism in Egypt
  - Anarchism in Morocco
  - Anarchism in Nigeria
  - Anarchism in South Africa
  - Anarchism in Tunisia
- Anarchism in the Americas
  - Anarchism in Argentina
  - Anarchism in Bolivia
  - Anarchism in Brazil
  - Anarchism in Canada
  - Anarchism in Chile
  - Anarchism in Colombia
  - Anarchism in Costa Rica
  - Anarchism in Cuba
  - Anarchism in the Dominican Republic
  - Anarchism in Ecuador
  - Anarchism in El Salvador
  - Anarchism in French Guiana
  - Anarchism in Guatemala
  - Anarchism in Mexico
  - Anarchism in Nicaragua
  - Anarchism in Panama
  - Anarchism in Paraguay
  - Anarchism in Peru
  - Anarchism in Puerto Rico
  - Anarchism in the United States
  - Anarchism in Uruguay
  - Anarchism in Venezuela
- Anarchism in Asia
  - Anarchism in Armenia
  - Anarchism in Azerbaijan
  - Anarchism in Bangladesh
  - Anarchism in China
  - Anarchism in Georgia
  - Anarchism in Hong Kong
  - Anarchism in India
  - Anarchism in Israel
  - Anarchism in Indonesia
  - Anarchism in Iran
  - Anarchism in Japan
  - Anarchism in Korea
  - Anarchism in Malaysia
  - Anarchism in Mongolia
  - Anarchism in the Philippines
  - Anarchism in Russia
  - Anarchism in Singapore
  - Anarchism in Syria
  - Anarchism in Taiwan
  - Anarchism in Timor-Leste
  - Anarchism in Turkey
  - Anarchism in Vietnam
- Anarchism in Europe
  - Individualist anarchism in Europe
  - Anarchism in Austria
  - Anarchism in France
  - Anarchism in Greece
  - Anarchism in Ireland
  - Anarchism in Italy
  - Anarchism in Poland
  - Anarchism in Russia
  - Anarchism in Spain
    - Spanish Revolution of 1936
  - Anarchism in Sweden
  - Anarchism in Ukraine
    - Makhnovshchina
  - Anarchism in the United Kingdom
- Anarchism in Oceania
  - Anarchism in Australia
  - Anarchism in New Zealand

=== Historians ===
- Paul Avrich
- David Goodway
- Daniel Guérin
- Peter Marshall
- Max Nettlau
- George Woodcock

Historical societies

- Anarchy Archives
- Centre International de Recherches sur l'Anarchisme
- Kate Sharpley Library
- Labadie Collection

== Organizations ==
=== Notable organizations ===
==== Political internationals ====
- International Alliance of Socialist Democracy (1868–1871)
- Anti-Authoritarian International (1872–1877)
- International Working People's Association (1881–1887)
- International Workers' Association (est. 1922)
  - Asociación Continental Americana de Trabajadores (1929–1941)
- International of Anarchist Federations (est. 1968)
- International Confederation of Labour (est. 2018)

==== Platformist federations ====
- Delo truda (1925–1930)
- Friends of Durruti Group (1937–1939)
- Uruguayan Anarchist Federation (est. 1956)
- Alternative libertaire (1991–2019)
- Revolutionary Confederation of Anarcho-Syndicalists (1994–2014)
- Autonomous Action (est. 2002)
- Zabalaza Anarchist Communist Front (est. 2003)
- Libertære Socialister (2009–2017)
- Libertarian Communist Union (est. 2019)
- The Platform (est. 2019)

==== Syndicalist federations ====
- Federation of Workers of the Spanish Region (1881–1888)
- Sociedad Cosmopolita de Resistencia y Colocación de Obreros Panaderos (1887–1930)
- Pact of Union and Solidarity (1888–1896)
- National Labor Secretariat (1893–1914)
- Confédération Générale du Travail (est. 1895)
- Free Association of German Trade Unions (1897–1919)
- Federation of Workers' Societies of the Spanish Region (1900–1907)
- Argentine Regional Workers' Federation (est. 1901)
- Industrial Workers of the World (est. 1905)
  - IWW-South Africa (1910–1922)
  - IWW-Chile (1919–1927)
- Uruguayan Regional Workers' Federation (1905–1964)
- Paraguayan Regional Workers' Federation (1906–1916)
- Workers' Federation of Chile (1906–1909)
- Solidaridad Obrera (1907–1910)
- Brazilian Workers' Confederation (1908–1915)
- Union of Russian Workers (1908–1919)
- Central Organisation of the Workers of Sweden (est. 1910)
- Confederación Nacional del Trabajo (est. 1910)
- Fagoppositionens Sammenslutning (1910–1921)
- Unione Sindacale Italiana (est. 1912)
- Peruvian Regional Workers' Federation (1912–1925)
- Casa del Obrero Mundial (1912–1916)
- Regional Workers' Federation of Chile (1913–1917)
- National Workers' Union (Portugal) (1914–1919)
- Norsk Syndikalistisk Forbund (est. 1916)
- Regional Workers' Center of Paraguay (1916–1934)
- Free Workers' Union of Germany (1919–1933)
- General Confederation of Labour (Portugal) (1919–1938)
- Syndicalist Defense Committee (1922–1926)
- Dutch Syndicalist Trade Union Federation (1923–1940)
- All-Japan Libertarian Federation of Labour Unions (1926–1936)
- Confédération Générale du Travail-Syndicaliste Révolutionnaire (1926–1939)
- Chilean Regional Workers' Federation (1926–1927)
- Local Workers' Federation (1926–1953)
- Comité Pro Acción Sindical (1928–1932)
- Syndikalistiska Arbetarefederationen (1928–1938)
- Libertarian Federal Council of Labour Unions of Japan (1929–1934)
- Union of Trade Unions (1931–1939)
- General Confederation of Workers of Chile (1931–1953)
- Confédération nationale du travail (est. 1946)
- Free Workers' Union (est. 1977)
- Solidarity Federation (est. 1979)
- Confederación General del Trabajo (est. 1979)
- Workers' Initiative (est. 2001)
- Autonomous Workers' Union (2011–2018)

==== Synthesis federations ====
- Anarchist Federation of Poland (1926–1939)
- Federación Anarquista Ibérica (est. 1927)
- Mexican Anarchist Federation (est. 1945)
- Fédération Anarchiste (est. 1945)
- Federazione Anarchica Italiana (est. 1945)
- Japanese Anarchist Federation (est. 1946)
- Argentine Libertarian Federation (est. 1955)
- Anarchist Federation (Britain) (est. 1986)

==== Militant groups ====
- The Disinherited (1882–1885)
- Boatmen of Thessaloniki (1898–1903)
- Chernoe Znamia (1903–1908)
- Union of Poor Peasants (1905–1908)
- Chinese Assassination Corps (1910–1911)
- Rewolucyjni Mściciele (1910–1914)
- Bonnot Gang (1911–1912)
- Red Battalions (1914–1916)
- Black Guards (1917–1919)
- Revolutionary Insurgent Army of Ukraine (1918–1921)
  - 1st Donetsk Corps (1919–1920)
  - 2nd Azov Corps (1919–1920)
  - 6th Kyiv Corps (1919–1920)
  - Air Fleet (1918–1921)
  - Azov-Black Sea Flotilla (1919)
  - Kontrrazvedka (1919–1921)
- Heroic Corps (1919–1928)
- Red Legion (1919–1925)
- Los Justicieros (1920–1922)
- Los Solidarios (1922–1924)
- Los Errantes (1924–1926)
- Black Band (1929–1933)
- Confederal militias (1934–1937)
  - Andalusia-Extremadura Column (1936–1937)
  - Ascaso Column (1936–1937)
  - Durruti Column (1936–1937)
  - Harriers Column (1936–1937)
  - Iberia Column (1936–1937)
  - Iron Column (1936–1937)
  - Land and Freedom Column (1936–1937)
  - Maroto Column (1936)
  - Red and Black Column (1936)
  - Rosal Column (1936–1937)
  - Torres-Benedito Column (1936–1937)
- Anarchist brigades in the Italian Resistance (1943–1945)
- 104th Company of Syndicalists (1943–1944)
- Syndicalist Brigade (1944–1945)
- Defensa Interior (1961–1965)
- First of May Group (1966–1974)
- The Angry Brigade (1968–1972)
- East Asia Anti-Japan Armed Front (1972–1975)
- 2 June Movement (1972–1980)
- Internationalist Revolutionary Action Groups (1973–1979)
- Resistencia Libertaria (1974–1978)
- Fasel Gang (1977–1991)
- Comandos Autónomos Anticapitalistas (1978–1985)
- Action Directe (1979–1987)
- CLODO (1980–1983)
- Squamish Five (1981–1983)
- People's Liberation Front (1989–1991)
- Revolutionary Nuclei (1996–2000)
- Informal Anarchist Federation (est. 2003)
- Revolutionary Struggle (est. 2003)
- Revolutionary Action (est. 2005)
- Leon Czolgosz Autonomous and Destructive Forces (2006–2009)
- Revolutionary Anarchist Front (2007–2009)
- Severino di Giovanni Antipatriot Band (2007–2012)
- Conspiracy of Fire Nuclei (est. 2008)
- Jean Marc Rouillan Armed and Heartless Columns (2008–2012)
- Revolutionary Cells (2009–2011)
- Sect of Revolutionaries (2009–2011)
- Iconoclastic Caravans for Free Will (2009–2012)
- Efraín Plaza Olmedo Dynamite Band (2009–2013)
- Práxedis G. Guerrero Autonomous Cells of Immediate Revolution (2009–2014)
- Vandalika Teodoro Suárez Gang (2010–2011)
- Mariano Sánchez Añón Insurrectional Cell (2010–2014)
- Antagonic Nuclei of the New Urban Guerrilla (est. 2011)
- Anarchic Cell for Revolutionary Solidarity (2012)
- People's Self-Defense (2013–2022)
- Organization for Revolutionary Self-Defense (2014–2019)
- Revolutionary Union for Internationalist Solidarity (est. 2015)
- Anarchist Struggle (est. 2017)
- International Revolutionary People's Guerrilla Forces (2017–2018)
- Combat Organization of Anarcho-Communists (est. 2018)
- Resistance Committee (est. 2022)

==== Others ====
- Jura federation (est. 1870)
- Freedom Press (est. 1886)
- Anarchist Black Cross (est. 1906)
- Mexican Liberal Party (est. 1906)
- Spies for Peace (1963)
- Popular Indigenous Council of Oaxaca "Ricardo Flores Magón" (est. 1997)
- Anarchists Against the Wall (est. 2003)

=== Structures ===
- Affinity group (e.g. Black bloc)
- Adhocracy
- Collective
- Cooperative
- Federation
- Participatory organization
- Popular assembly
- Security culture
- Spokescouncil
- Syndicate
- Union of egoists
- Workers' council

== Literature ==
=== Manifestos and expositions ===
(1840–1914)

- Anarchist Manifesto (1850) by Anselme Bellegarrigue
- The General Idea of the Revolution in the Nineteenth Century (1851) by Pierre-Joseph Proudhon
- The Principles of Anarchism (c. 1890s) by Lucy Parsons
- The Soul of Man under Socialism (1891) by Oscar Wilde
- The Conquest of Bread (1892) by Peter Kropotkin
- Anarchy Defended by Anarchists (1896) by Emma Goldman and Johann Most

(1914–1984)

- Anarchism: From Theory to Practice (1965) by Daniel Guérin

(1985–present)

- Listen, Anarchist! (1987) by Chaz Bufe
- Anarchy Alive! (2007) by Uri Gordon
- The Government of No One: The Theory and Practice of Anarchism (2019) by Ruth Kinna

== Notable figures ==
Argentina
- Facón Grande
- Facundo Cabral
- Luisa Lallana
- Osvaldo Bayer
- Severino Di Giovanni
- Simón Radowitzky
- Soledad Rosas
- Virginia Bolten

Armenia

- Alexander Atabekian
- Christapor Mikaelian

Australia

- Chummy Fleming
- Fred Hollows
- Gary Foley
- Germaine Greer
- Graeme Dunstan
- Kleber Claux
- Montague Miller

Austria

- Etta Federn
- Otto Gross

Belgium

- Edward Joris
- Émile Verhaeren
- Ernest Tanrez
- Marie Vuillemin
- Noël Godin
- Victor Serge

Bolivia

- Petronila Infantes

Bosnia and Herzegovina

- Bogdan Žerajić
- Nedeljko Čabrinović

Brazil

- Camila Jourdan
- Domingos Passos
- Elvira Boni
- Maria Lacerda de Moura
- Neno Vasco

Bulgaria

- Mariola Sirakova
- Manol Vasev
- Paraskev Stoyanov
- Spiro Gulabchev
- Tinko Simov
- Tsvetana Jermanova

Canada

- Dimitrios Roussopoulos
- Efrim Menuck
- George Woodcock
- Gord Hill
- Jaggi Singh (activist)

Chile

- Juan De Marchi
- Juan Onofre Chamorro
- Manuel Rojas (author)
- Teresa Wilms Montt

China

- Ba Jin
- Cai Yuanpei
- Chen Jiongming
- He Zhen (anarchist)
- Li Shizeng
- Liu Shifu
- Taixu
- Wong Sau Ying
- Wu Zhihui
- Zhang Renjie

Cuba

- Canek Sánchez Guevara

Czechia

- Franz Kafka
- Jakub Polák (anarchist)
- Luisa Landová-Štychová

Denmark

- Halfdan Rasmussen

Ecuador

- Piedad Moscoso

Finland

- Harry Järv
- Kaarlo Uskela

France

- Albert Camus
- Alexandra David-Néel
- André Breton
- Anselme Bellegarrigue
- Auguste Vaillant
- Caroline Rémy de Guebhard
- Célestin Freinet
- Clément Duval
- Daniel Guérin
- Élisée Reclus
- Émile Armand
- Émile Henry (anarchist)
- Émile Pouget
- Eugène Varlin
- Félix Fénéon
- Fernand Pelloutier
- Georges Brassens
- Jacques Ellul
- Jean Grave
- Jean Vigo
- Joëlle Aubron
- Joseph Déjacque
- Jules Bonnot
- Jules Vallès
- Julien Coupat
- Louise Michel
- Marius Jacob
- Maximilien Luce
- Octave Mirbeau
- Paul Signac
- Paul Virilio
- Pierre-Joseph Proudhon
- Ravachol
- Sébastien Faure
- Simone Weil
- Théodore Monod
- Théophile Steinlen
- Zo d'Axa

Georgia

- Varlam Cherkezishvili

Germany

- Adolf Brand
- Angela Gossow
- Augustin Souchy
- B. Traven
- Carl Einstein
- Etta Federn
- Erich Mühsam
- Gustav Landauer
- Helmut Rüdiger
- Hugo Ball
- Wilhelm Marr

Greece

- Alexandros Schinas
- Elias Petropoulos
- Pola Roupa
- Yannis Tamtakos

Iceland

- Birgitta Jónsdóttir
- Haukur Hilmarsson

India

- Bhagat Singh
- Har Dayal
- M. P. T. Acharya

Ireland

- Finbar Cafferkey
- Jack White (Irish socialist)
- Marie and Noel Murray
- Patrick Read
- Ronan Bennett
- Ubi Dwyer

Israel

- Abraham Yehudah Khein
- Jonathan Pollak
- Toma Sik
- Uri Gordon (anarchist)
- Yehuda Ashlag

Italy

- Alfredo Cospito
- Argo Secondari
- Camillo Berneri
- Carlo Cafiero
- Errico Malatesta
- Fabrizio De André
- Gaetano Bresci
- Gino Lucetti
- Giovanni Passannante
- Giuseppe Pinelli
- Horst Fantazzini
- Mario Buda
- Michele Angiolillo
- Luigi Galleani
- Luigi Lucheni
- Sante Geronimo Caserio
- Ugo Mazzucchelli
- Umberto Lenzi

Korea

- Baek Jeong-gi
- Kim Chwajin
- Lee Hoe-yeong
- Pak Yol
- Shin Chae-ho
- Yi Jeong-gyu

Japan

- Hatta Shūzō
- Hiratsuka Raichō
- Itō Noe
- Jun Tsuji
- Kaneko Fumiko
- Kanno Sugako
- Kenzaburō Ōe
- Kenzō Okuzaki
- Kōtoku Shūsui
- Mochizuki Yuriko
- Ōsugi Sakae
- Satoshi Kirishima
- Uchiyama Gudō

Macedonia

- Atanas Razdolov

Mexico

- Juana Belén Gutiérrez de Mendoza
- Julio López Chávez
- Margarita Ortega (magonist)
- Plotino Rhodakanaty
- Ricardo Flores Magón
- Tomás Cruz Lorenzo

Netherlands

- Bart de Ligt
- Carolina Bunjes
- Christiaan Cornelissen
- Clara Wichmann
- Edo Fimmen
- Ferdinand Domela Nieuwenhuis
- Joop Westerweel
- Simon Berman
- Wieke Bosch

New Zealand

- Philip Josephs
- Simon Oosterman

Nigeria

- Sam Mbah

Norway

- Hans Jæger
- Henrik Ibsen
- Ivar Mortensson-Egnund
- Jens Bjørneboe

Paraguay

- Moisés Santiago Bertoni
- Obdulio Barthe

Peru

- Manuel González Prada
- Miguelina Acosta Cárdenas
- Teodomiro Gutiérrez Cuevas

Poland

- Aniela Wolberg
- Edward Abramowski
- German Askarov
- Jan Wacław Machajski
- German Askarov
- Walery Mroczkowski

Portugal

- Alfredo Luís da Costa
- Antero de Quental
- Deolinda Lopes Vieira
- Mário Castelhano
- Vitorino

Romania

- Alexandru Bogdan-Pitești
- Barbu Lăzăreanu
- Dumitru Țepeneag
- Eugen Relgis
- Ilie Cătărău
- Panait Mușoiu
- Zamfir Arbore
- Ion Ionescu-Căpățână

Russia

- Aleksandr Ge
- Aleksei Gan
- Alexander Schapiro
- Anatoli Zhelezniakov
- Anastasia Baburova
- Azat Miftakhov
- Dmitry Ivanovich Popov
- Dmitry Petrov (anarchist)
- Georgy Gapon
- Grigorii Maksimov
- Leo Tolstoy
- Lev Chernyi
- Mikhail Bakunin
- Nadya Tolokonnikova
- Peter Arshinov
- Peter Kropotkin
- Sergey Stepnyak-Kravchinsky
- Stepan Petrichenko
- Volin
- Yegor Letov

Spain

- Agustín Rueda
- Amparo Poch y Gascón
- Ana Sigüenza
- Andreu Nin
- Ángel Pestaña
- Anselmo Lorenzo
- Antonio Ortiz Ramírez
- Bernabé López Calle
- Buenaventura Durruti
- Elisa Garrido
- Federica Montseny
- Felipe Sandoval
- Fermín Salvochea
- Fernando Fernán Gómez
- Fernando Tarrida del Mármol
- Francisco Ferrer
- Isaac Puente
- Joaquín Ascaso
- José Pellicer Gandía
- Juan García Oliver
- Kasilda Hernáez
- Koldo Mitxelena
- Lucía Sánchez Saornil
- Lucio Urtubia
- Manuel Pardiñas
- Maria Silva Cruz
- Melchor Rodríguez García
- Pepita Laguarda Batet
- Rafael Farga i Pellicer
- Ramón Acín
- Ramón de la Sagra
- Ricardo Sanz García
- Sabaté brothers
- Salvador Puig Antich
- Salvador Seguí
- Teresa Mañé
- Teresa Torrelles

Sweden

- Björn Söderberg
- Elise Ottesen-Jensen
- Helmut Rüdiger
- Ivan Aguéli
- Mattias Gardell
- Monica Sjöö
- Stig Dagerman

Switzerland

- Adhémar Schwitzguébel
- Clara Thalmann
- Fritz Brupbacher
- James Guillaume
- Joseph Favre
- Lucien Tronchet
- Maia arson crimew
- Marco Camenisch

Syria

- Omar Aziz

Taiwan

- Audrey Tang

Turkey

- Mehmet Tarhan
- Tayfun Gönül

Tunisia

- Amina Tyler

Ukraine

- Aron Baron
- Dmitrii Bogrov
- Fedir Shchus
- Halyna Kuzmenko
- Lev Zadov
- Maria Nikiforova
- Mollie Steimer
- Mykhailo Drahomanov
- Nestor Makhno
- Oleksandr Volodarsky
- Olexandr Kolchenko
- Olga Taratuta
- Osip Tsebriy
- Sascha Schapiro
- Semen Karetnyk
- Serhiy Kemsky
- Sholem Schwarzbard
- Simeon Pravda
- Sophie Kropotkin
- Viktor Bilash
- Voldemar Antoni

United Kingdom

- Ian Bone
- Anna Campbell
- Stuart Christie
- Alex Comfort
- Nancy Cunard
- Ruth Kinna
- Sam Mainwaring
- Ethel Mannin
- Dora Marsden
- Albert Meltzer
- Michael Moorcock
- Alan Moore
- Saul Newman
- Penny Rimbaud
- Vi Subversa
- Nicolas Walter
- Colin Ward
- Charlotte Wilson
- Lilian Wolfe
- Benjamin Zephaniah

United States of America

- Adin Ballou
- Albert Parsons
- Kuwasi Balagoon
- Alexander Berkman
- Carlo Tresca
- Chris Hedges
- David Graeber
- Dorothy Day
- Peter Gelderloos
- Emma Goldman
- Emmett Grogan
- Hendrik Meijer
- Howard Zinn
- Jacob Appelbaum
- Jeff Monson
- Jeremy Hammond
- John Zerzan
- Josh Wolf (journalist)
- Kurt Vonnegut
- Lawrence Ferlinghetti
- Leon Czolgosz
- Lorenzo Kom'boa Ervin
- Luisa Capetillo
- Lucy Parsons
- Martin Sostre
- Michael Malice
- Moxie Marlinspike
- Murray Bookchin
- Noam Chomsky
- Paul Goodman
- Peter Lamborn Wilson
- Robert Anton Wilson
- Sigismund Danielewicz
- Tom Cornell
- Vermin Supreme
- Voltairine de Cleyre
- Woody Harrelson

Uruguay

- Abraham Guillén
- Florencio Sánchez
- Lilián Celiberti

=== Non-anarchists influential on anarchism ===
- Guy Debord
- Friedrich Engels
- Michel Foucault
- Charles Fourier
- William Godwin
- Daniel de Leon
- Rosa Luxemburg
- Herbert Marcuse
- Sylvain Maréchal
- Karl Marx
- Friedrich Nietzsche
- Franz Oppenheimer
- Jean-Jacques Rousseau
- Max Stirner
- Raoul Vaneigem
- Gerrard Winstanley
- Zeno of Citium

== Places named after anarchists ==
- Action Directe (climb), Germany
- Anarchist Mountain, Canada
- Collège Louise-Michel in Paris, France
- Doctor Moisés Bertoni, Paraguay
- Dorothy Day homeless shelter, United States
- Eloxochitlán de Flores Magón, Mexico
- Fred Hollows Reserve, Australia
- Haymarket Martyrs' Monument, US
- Georg von Rauch Haus, Germany
- Golets Kropotkin, Russia
- Louise Michel station, France
- Kropotkin, Irkutsk Oblast, Russia
- Kropotkin, Krasnodar Krai, Russia
- Kropotkin Range, Russia
- Kropotkinskaya, Russia
- Medical University of Varna "Prof. Dr. Paraskev Stoyanov", Bulgaria
- Metropolitan Ervin Szabó Library, Hungary
- Mount Kropotkin, Antarctica
- Parc Georges-Brassens, France
- Práxedis G. Guerrero Municipality, Mexico
- Práxedis Gilberto Guerrero, Chihuahua, Mexico
- Red Emma's, United States
- Ricardo Flores Magón metro station, Mexico
- Scientific Monument Moises Bertoni, Paraguay
- Soviet monitor Zhelezniakov, Ukraine
- Teotitlán de Flores Magón, Mexico
- Tolstoy, United States

== Related philosophies ==
- Absurdism
- Existentialism
- Libertarian socialism
  - Democratic confederalism
  - Neozapatismo
- Nihilism
- Panarchism
- Voluntaryism

== See also ==
- Anti-globalization/Globalization
- Anti-fascism
- Anti-war
- Civil rights
- Labour movement
- Tax resistance
