= Greece–Mexico relations =

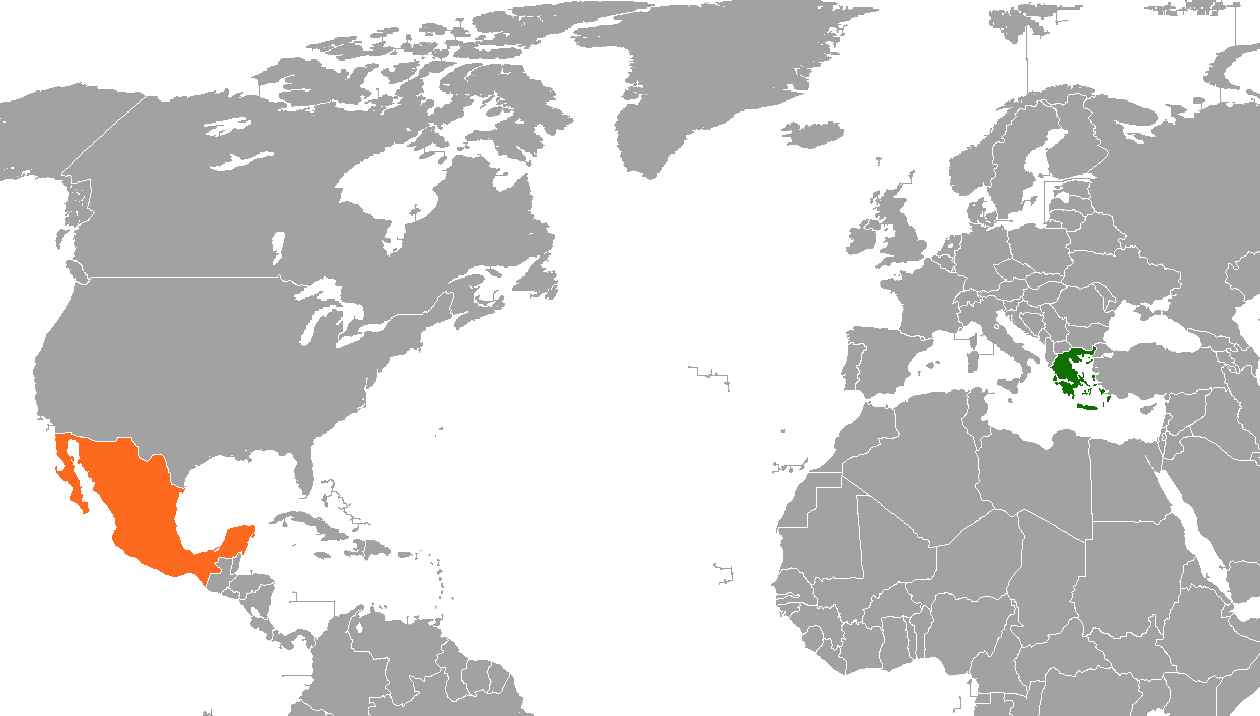

- Greece: Mexico

The nations of Greece and Mexico established diplomatic relations in 1938. Early Greek migration to Mexico contributed to the industrial agricultural development of the North-Western Pacific state of Sinaloa. Both nations are members of the Organisation for Economic Co-operation and Development and the United Nations.

== History ==
The first wave of Greek migrants arrived to Mexico during the Porfiriato years of President Porfirio Díaz; settling primarily in the Pacific state of Sinaloa. During the 1920s more Greek migrants arrived and they contributed greatly to the development of industrial agricultural businesses making the state of Sinaloa the breadbasket of Mexico to this day.

Diplomatic relations between Greece and Mexico were established on the 17 May 1938 immediately after the signing of the Treaty of Friendship between both nations. Between 1955 and 1964 diplomatic relations were carried out between Mexico's embassy in Rome, Italy and Greece's embassy in Washington, D.C., United States; and through their respective honorary consulates.

In 1963, President Adolfo López Mateos became the first Mexican head-of-state to visit Greece. In 1965 resident embassies were established in each other's capitals. In May 1986, Mexican Foreign Secretary Bernardo Sepúlveda Amor paid a visit to Greece to sign bilateral agreements between both nations. In August 1986, Greek Prime Minister Andreas Papandreou paid an official visit to Mexico, becoming the first Greek head-of-government to visit the nation. In 1991, Greek Foreign Minister (and future Prime Minister) Antonis Samaras paid a visit to Mexico. There have been several additional visits by foreign ministers of both nations thus strengthening their bilateral relationship.

In August 2016, shots were fired at the Mexican Embassy in Athens which was later discovered to have been conducted by the Organization for Revolutionary Self-Defense, a Greek far-left group targeting embassies of countries it disagrees with on their attitude towards refugees, social movements, the natural environment and local communities.

In February 2020, a 'Mexico-Greece Friendship Group' was installed in the Mexican Chamber of Deputies; which focuses on the protection of cultural assets against climate change and the illegal trafficking of archaeological pieces.

In 2023, both nations celebrated 84 years of diplomatic relations.

== High-level visits ==
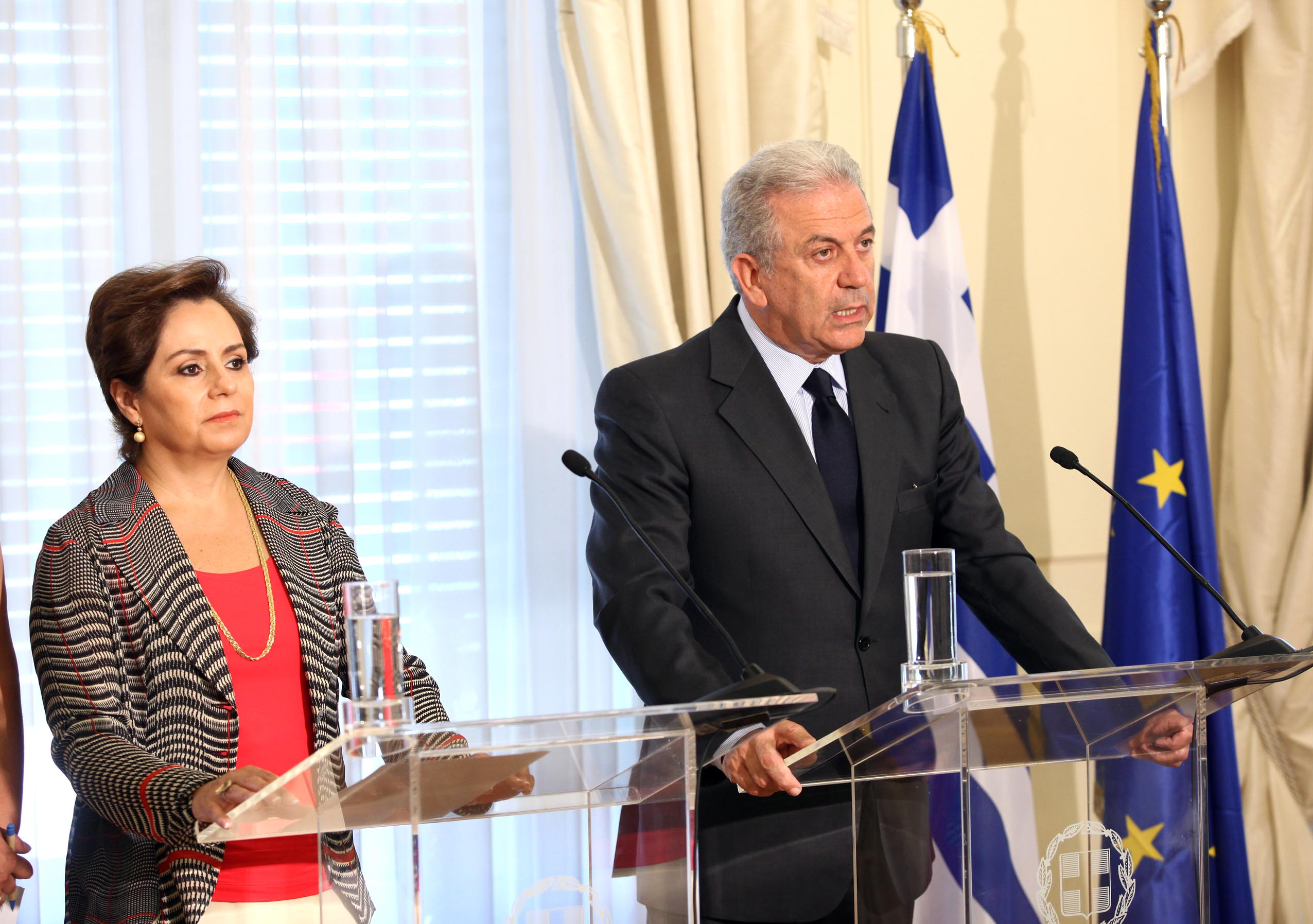
Mexican Foreign Secretary Patricia Espinosa and Greek Foreign Minister Dimitris Avramopoulos in Athens; July 2012.

High-level visits from Greece to Mexico

- Prime Minister Andreas Papandreou (1986)
- Foreign Minister Antonis Samaras (1991)
- Foreign Minister Theodoros Pangalos (1998)

High-level visits from Mexico to Greece

- President Adolfo López Mateos (1963)
- Foreign Secretary Bernardo Sepúlveda Amor (1986)
- Foreign Secretary Fernando Solana (1992)
- Foreign Secretary Rosario Green (1999)
- Foreign Undersecretary Juan Rebolledo (1999)
- Foreign Secretary Luis Ernesto Derbez (2003)
- Foreign Secretary Patricia Espinosa (2012)

== Bilateral relations ==
Both nations have signed several bilateral agreements such as a Treaty of Friendship (1938); Trade Agreement (1960); Agreement on Education and Cultural Cooperation (1982); Agreement of Cooperation in Tourism (1992); Agreement on Scientific and Technical Cooperation (1999); Extradition Treaty (1999); Agreement in Scientific and Technological Cooperation (1999); Agreement on Mutual Legal Assistance in Criminal Matters (1999); Agreement on the Promotion and Protection of Investments (2000); Agreement on the Avoidance of Double-Taxation and Tax Evasion (2004) and a Memorandum of Understanding between both nations Diplomatic Institutions (2009).

== Trade relations ==
In 2000, Mexico signed a Free Trade Agreement with the European Union (which includes Greece). Since 2000, trade between the two countries has grown considerably. In 2023, two-way trade between both nations amounted to US$307 million. Greece's main exports to Mexico include: parts and accessories for watt meters; razors and blades. Mexico's main exports to Greece include: tequila, process units, chickpea, memory units and malt beer.

== Resident diplomatic missions ==
- Greece has an embassy in Mexico City
- Mexico has an embassy in Athens.

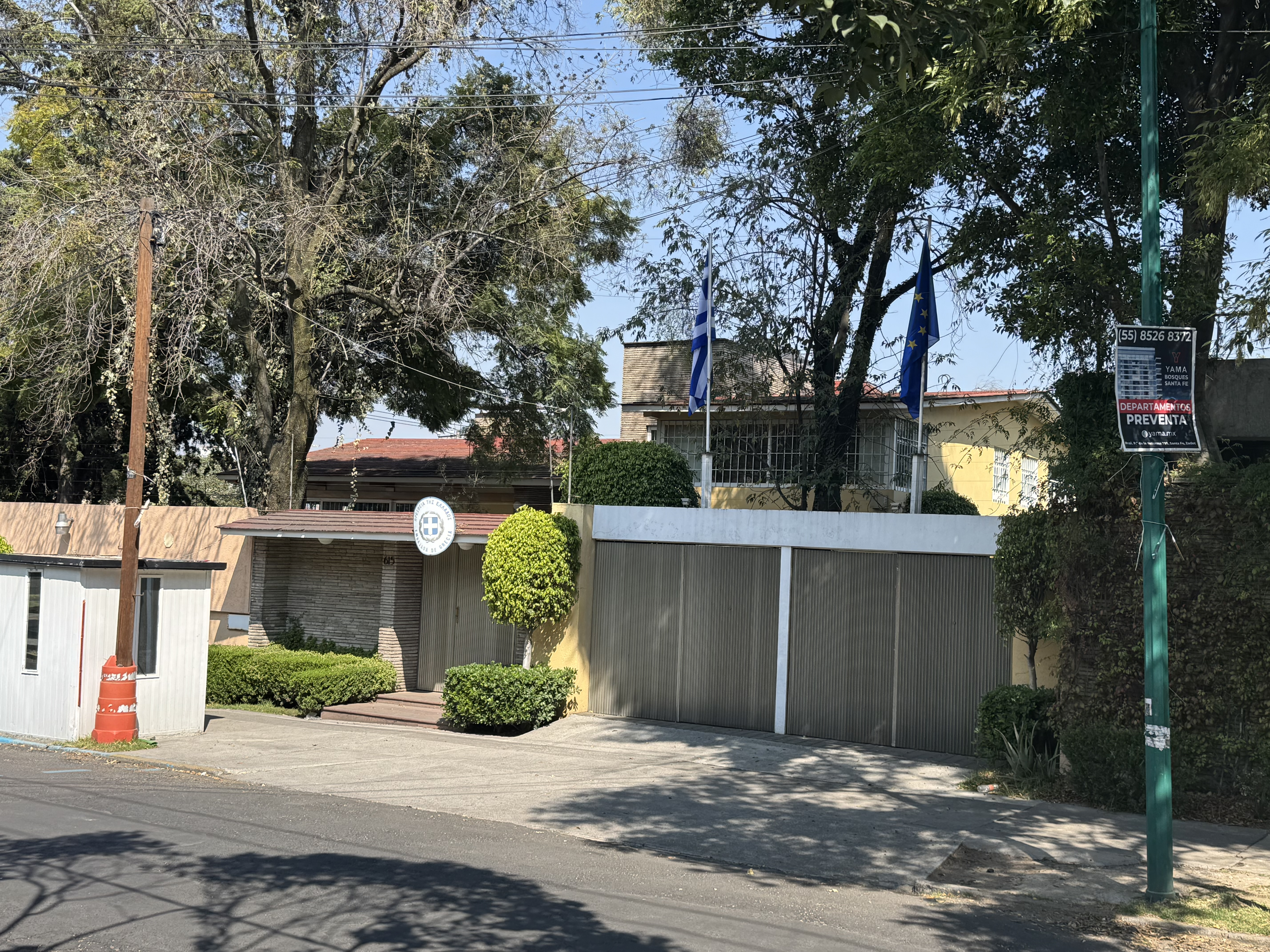
Embassy of Greece in Mexico City

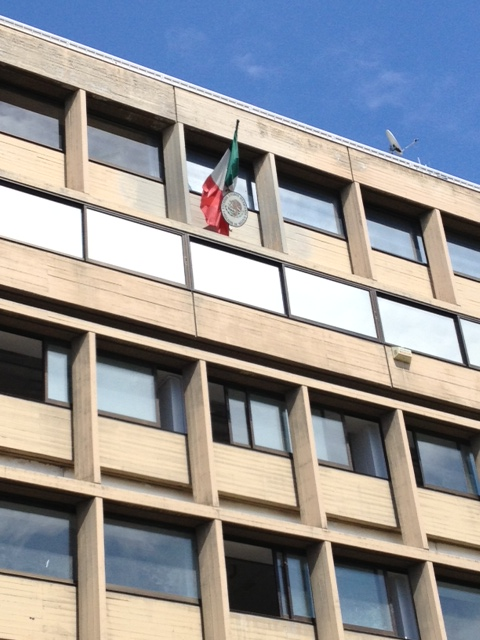
Embassy of Mexico in Athens

== See also ==
- Greek Mexicans
- Mexico–EU relations
