= Lallana =

Lallana is a surname. Notable people with this surname include:

- Adam Lallana (born 1988), an English football player
- Ibone Lallana (born 1976), a Spanish taekwondo practitioner
- Juan Carlos Lallana (1938 – 2022), an Argentine football player
- Luisa Lallana (1910 – 1928), an Argentine dockworker
