= Greek Mexicans =

Greek Mexicans greco-mexicanos
Total population
- 248 Greece-born residents (2015) est.1,500 families of Greek descent

Regions with significant populations
- Sinaloa, Mexico City, Guadalajara

Languages
- Mexican Spanish and Greek

Religion
- Christianity

Related ethnic groups
- Greeks and Greek diaspora

Greek Mexicans (Greek: Ελληνομεξικανοί) are people of whole or partial Greek descent living in Mexico. The largest Greek communities are in Mexico City, Naucalpan, Guadalajara, and Sinaloa. Smaller numbers of Greeks can be found in Aguascalientes, Acaponeta, Tepic, and Pachuca.

== History ==
Greeks have immigrated to Mexico since the 18th century, with the largest influx arriving in the mid-20th century and settling in Mexico City, Sinaloa state, and border cities. While many had left Greece due to war, political instability and economic problems in Greece, the Mexican government also offered incentives for Greeks to work in Mexico, specifically in Sinaloa. During the 1940s, the Mexican government invited a large number of Greeks to Sinaloa to improve harvest of tomatoes. Soon the Greek community became so large that the area around the Tamazula, Humaya, and Culiacán rivers became known as the "Valle de Grecia" (“Valley of Greece”). Today, Sinaloa has a heavy Greek presence, and Greek surnames are very common in the state. Greek Mexican families can also be found in other major cities around the republic, such as Mexico City and Guadalajara. Most Greeks that arrived in Mexico City went to live in La Merced neighborhood and formed a community around Calle Academia or Academia Street. They had many businesses catered to Greek immigrants as well as for other immigrants and locals.

== Figures ==
Statistics regarding the exact number of Greek people in Mexico vary greatly, especially due to the different numbers for native-born Greeks and for Mexican citizens of Greek descent. The only official number is of native-born Greeks, which stood at 298 at the time the Mexican national census of 2000. When including descendants of Greeks, published estimates range from 1,000 to 4,000 individuals.

The General Secretariat for Greeks Abroad estimates that only 1,000 Greeks live in Mexico. On the other hand, according to the Greek Ministry of Foreign Affairs, the number stands at about 4,000, including descendants of Greeks. In agreement with the estimate by the Greek Ministry of Foreign Affairs, Elena Stamatiadou, president of the Comunidad Helenica de Mexico in Mexico City, estimated that there are at least 1,500 Greek families living in Mexico. Stamatiadou stated that most families are of second and third-generation ethnic Greeks from Euboea, Greece's second largest island. A lower estimate of 300 families was published in Greece Now magazine in 2004. Other sources report significant numbers of immigrants from Cyprus and mainland Greece.

== Communities ==
=== Greektown in Mexico City ===
Thousands of Greeks immigrated to Mexico City and formed a community on and around Calle Academia or Academia Street in the La Merced neighborhood. Many families had businesses that catered to Greek families as well as others such as nearby Turkish, Lebanese, Jewish, Armenian, Syrian, Italian, Spanish, Portuguese, Chinese, Japanese and local families in the area. Pita Bread and Gyro style cooking styles heavily influenced Mexican gastronomy, especially in Mexico City. After two generations the families prospered and moved to other parts of the city and suburbs such as Naucalpan where they built the largest Greek Orthodox Church in the country. The Legacy of the Greektown or Barrio Griego is close to gone today as migrants from other parts of Mexico, especially Oaxaca, have moved in as La Merced is the "port of entry" for many migrants from other parts of the world as well as every corner of Mexico. Today, around Mexico City, many families are found in the more affluent southern neighborhoods but many younger Greek-Mexicans live in trendier neighborhoods such as La Roma, Polanco, Zona Rosa, Napoles and Santa Fe while many others have been returning to the Historical Center as well.

=== Sinaloa ===
The state of Sinaloa has the largest Greek community in all of Mexico, with estimates in the capital city of Culiacán standing at 2,000 individuals. Greeks can also be found in the cities of Mazatlán, Guamúchil, Guasave, and Los Mochis. Culiacán is home to the Comunidad Helénica of Culiacán (Hellenic Community of Culiacán).

=== Naucalpan ===
Around 250 Greek Mexican families, or 1,500 individuals, live in and around Mexico City. A major centerpiece of the Greek community of the Greater Mexico City area is the Greek Orthodox Church of Santa Sofia in Naucalpan, Mexico State. The church also serves as the home for the Comunidad Helenica de Mexico (Hellenic Community of Mexico).

=== Guadalajara ===
Guadalajara is home to around 230 Greeks. It is also the home of the Casa Helenica de Guadalajara (Hellenic House of Guadalajara) and the Amigos de Grecia (Friends of Greece), which organize community events and offers Greek classes to the public. Colotlán, Jalisco has its own Greek community.

== Numbers ==
Greek net migration to Mexico from 1857 to 1976
Year period	Greek-speaking immigrants
1857–1860	54
1861–1870	100
1871–1880	102
1881–1890	383
1891–1900	1,042
1901–1910	1,372
1911–1920	6,374
1921–1930	1,370
1931–1940	1,910
1941–1950	3,298
1951–1960	N/A
1961–1970	N/A
1971–1976	85
Total	16,090

== Notable people ==
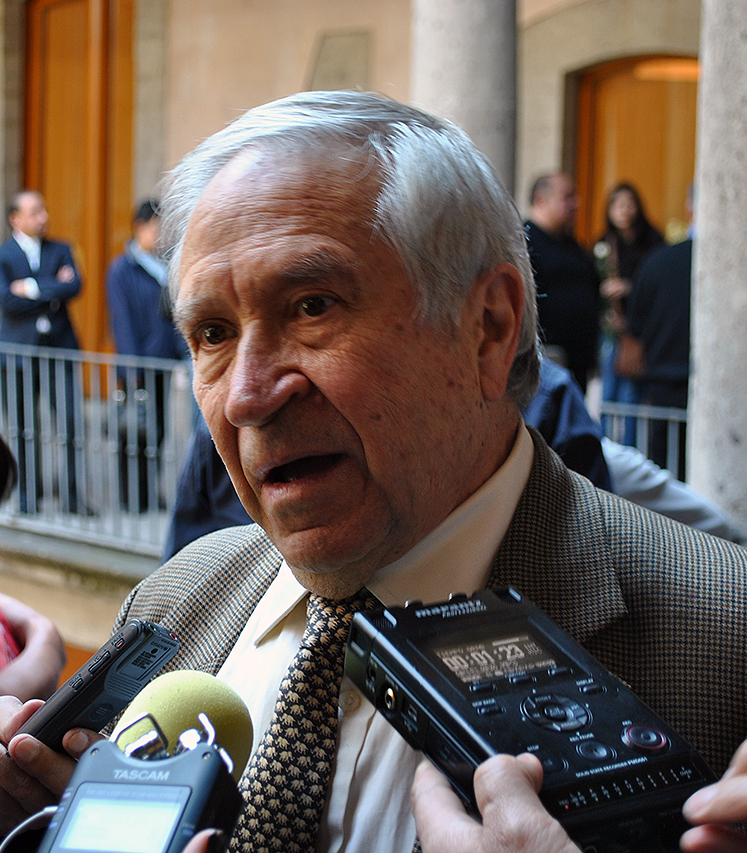
Homero Aridjis, prominent writer

- Homero Aridjis - writer and diplomat
- Mauricio Aridjis - writer
- Los Chicharrines - comedians
- Crisantes - singer
- Constantino Costas - actor
- Lambrina Kolioussi - of UNAM and the Hellenic Community of Mexico
- Lampros Kontogiannis - football player
- Sofía Lama - actress
- Enrique Metinides - photographer
- Felipe Muñoz Kapamas - 1968 Olympic gold medalist and head of the Olympic Committee of Mexico
- Plotino Rhodakanaty - anarchist
- Dimitrios Sarrás - actor and director

== See also ==
- Greece–Mexico relations
- Greek diaspora
- Demographics of Mexico
- White Mexicans
