= The Platform =

The Platform may refer to:

- The Platform (film), a Spanish horror film
- The Platform (TV series), an Emirati TV series
- The Platform (album), a hip-hop album by the group Dilated Peoples
- thePlatform, an online video publishing company
- The Platform (Finland), a Finnish anarchist group
- The Platform (Germany), a German anarcho-communist group
- The Platform, a venue in Morecambe, England, in the former Morecambe Promenade railway station building
- The Platform (radio station), a New Zealand online radio station

== See also ==
- Platform (disambiguation)
