= Platforming =

Platforming may refer to:

- A catalytic reforming process
- The mechanics of a platform game

== See also ==
- Deplatforming, an administrative or political action to deny access to a platform to express opinions
- Platform (disambiguation)
