= Kilifarevo =

Kilifarevo Килифарево
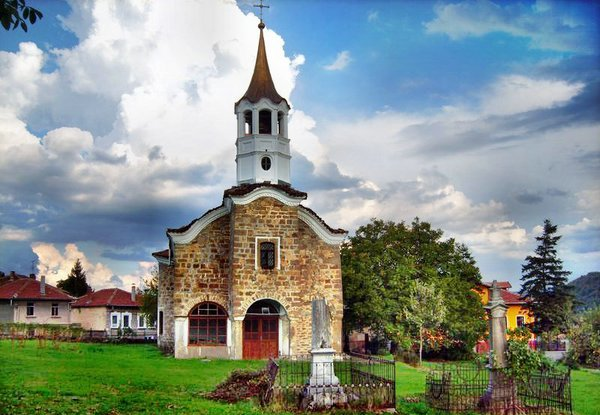
- The Saint Archangel Michael Church in Kilifarevo

- Location of Kilifarevo
- Coordinates: 42°59′N 25°38′E
- Country: Bulgaria
- Provinces (Oblast): Veliko Tarnovo

Government
  - Mayor: Dimitar Sabev
- Elevation: 303 m (994 ft)

Population (2005-09-13)
  - Total: 2,532
- Time zone: UTC+2 (EET)
  - Summer (DST): UTC+3 (EEST)
- Postal Code: 5050
- Area code: 06114
- License plate: BT

Kilifarevo (Bulgarian: Килифарево [kiliˈfarɛvo]) is a small town in central northern Bulgaria, administratively part of Veliko Tarnovo Municipality, Veliko Tarnovo Province. Previously a village, it was proclaimed a town in 1973.

== History ==
Ruins and remains are proof of the presence of civilization in the neighbouring area since the times of the Thracians. A fortress which guarded a pass through the Balkan Mountains existed nearby during the Roman Empire. During the Second Bulgarian Empire and more precisely the rule of Ivan Alexander (1331–1371), Kilifarevo was a centre of literary activity and the site of Theodosius of Tarnovo's school and monastery, founded in 1350, which actively promoted the spiritual practice of hesychasm.

Upon Bulgaria's conquest by the Ottoman Empire, the monastery was besieged, captured and razed by the invading Ottomans. It was later reconstructed and still exists today. During the Ottoman rule, Kilifarevo was the birthplace of Velcho Atanasov the Glazier, who organized the Velchova zavera (Велчова завера), an unsuccessful uprising against the Ottomans, in 1835.

Kilifarevo has a cultural centre (chitalishte), founded in 1884 and called Napredak ("Progress"), and a museum of local history, which occupies an old house. There are two Eastern Orthodox churches, St Archangel Michael and Dormition of the Mother of God.

In the wake of the 1923 Bulgarian coup d'état, Kilifarevo saw a peasant uprising against the new government. Between 1924 and 1925, anti-fascist partisan activity was also carried out by a local anarchist Cheta, led by Georgi Popov, Georgi Sheitanov, and Mariola Sirakova.

== Namesakes ==
Kilifarevo Island in Aitcho Islands in the South Shetland Islands, Antarctica is named after Kilifarevo.

== Gallery ==
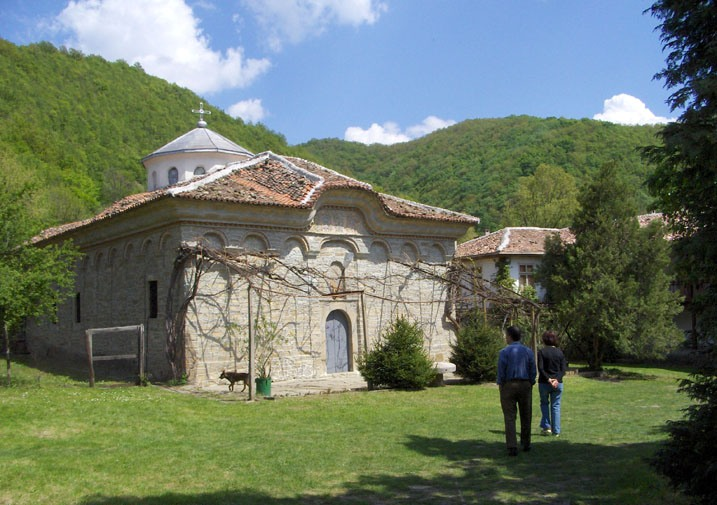
Main church of the Kilifarevo Monastery

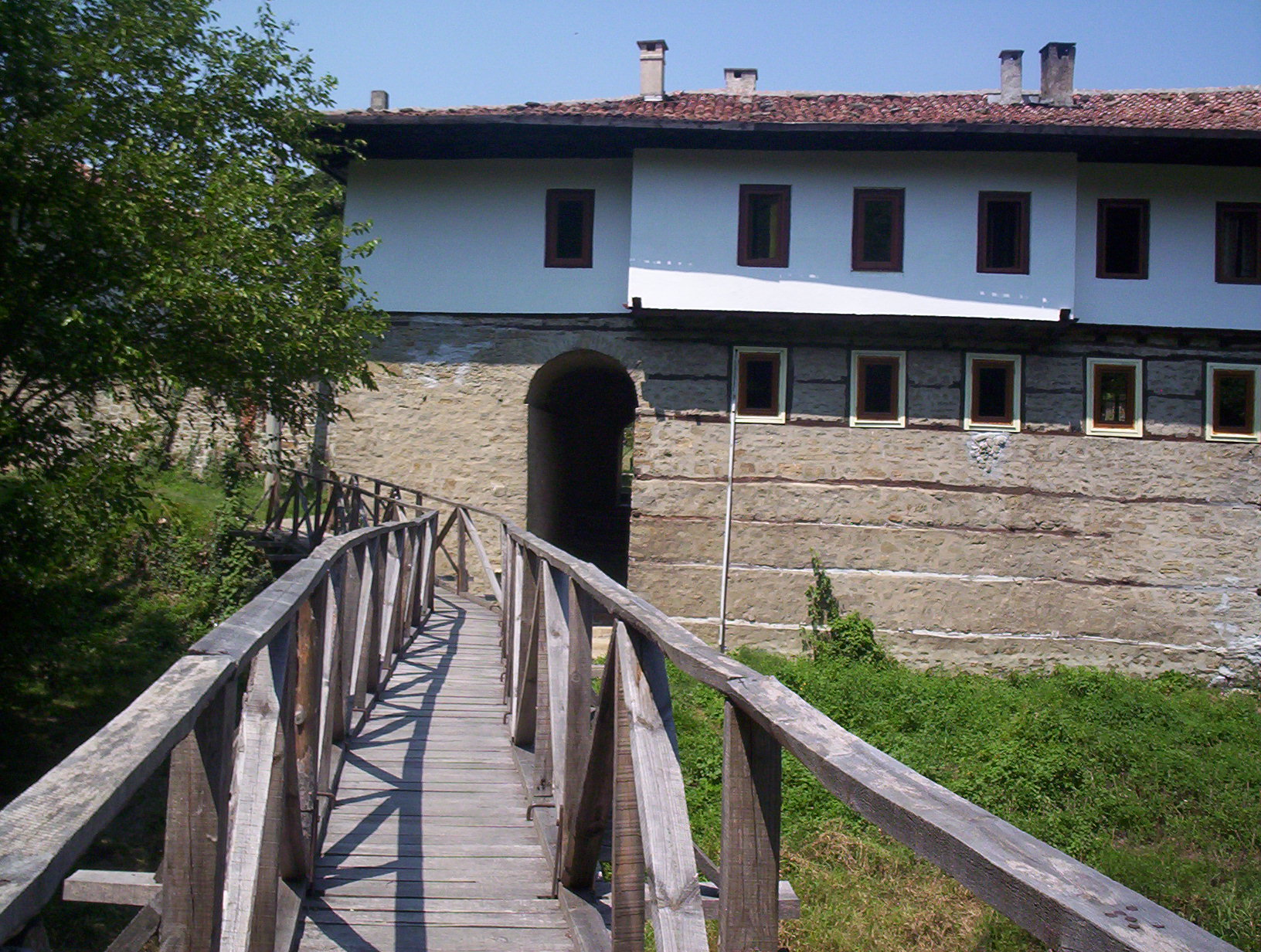
Kilifarevo Monastery

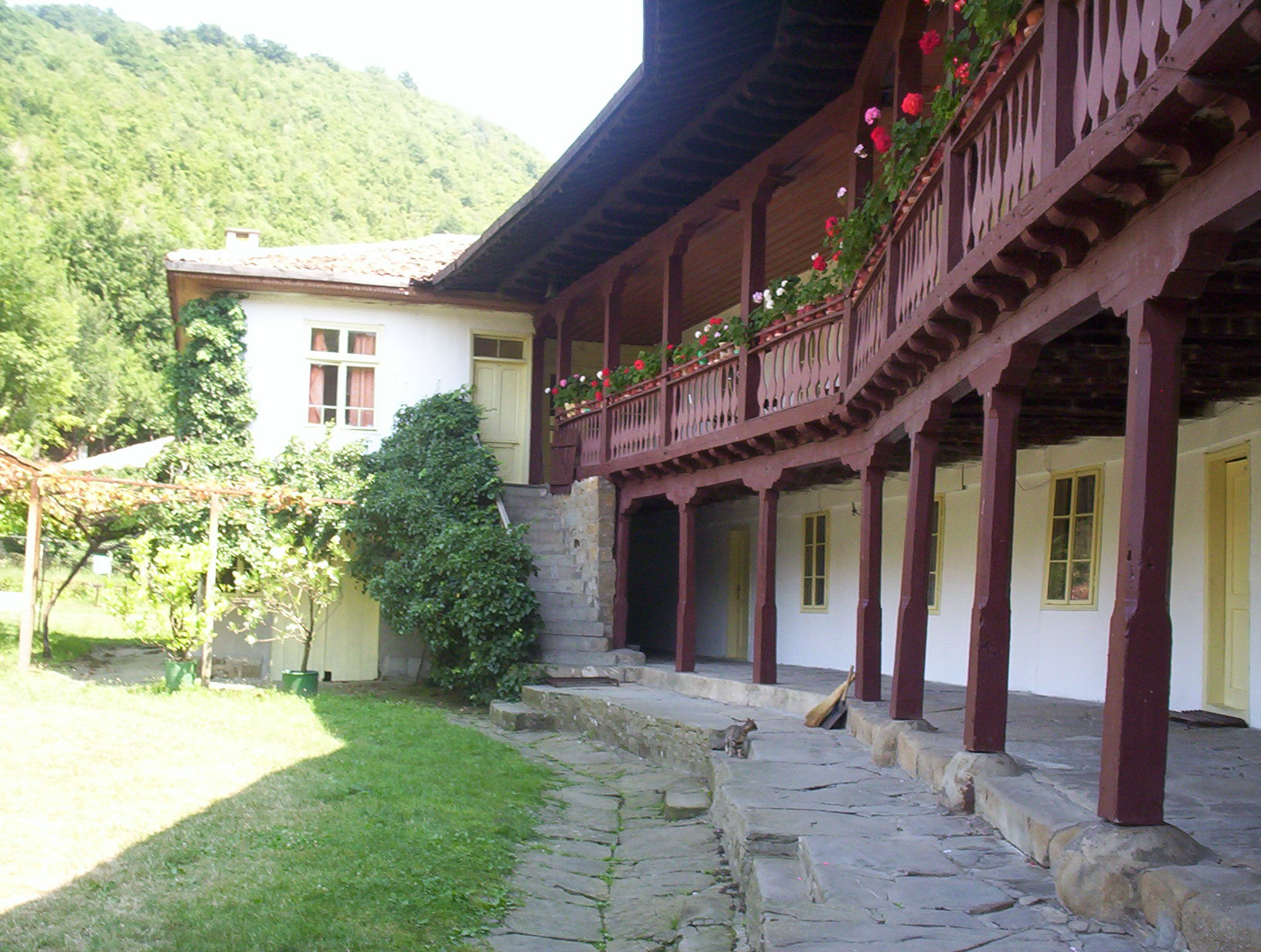
Kilifarevo Monastery

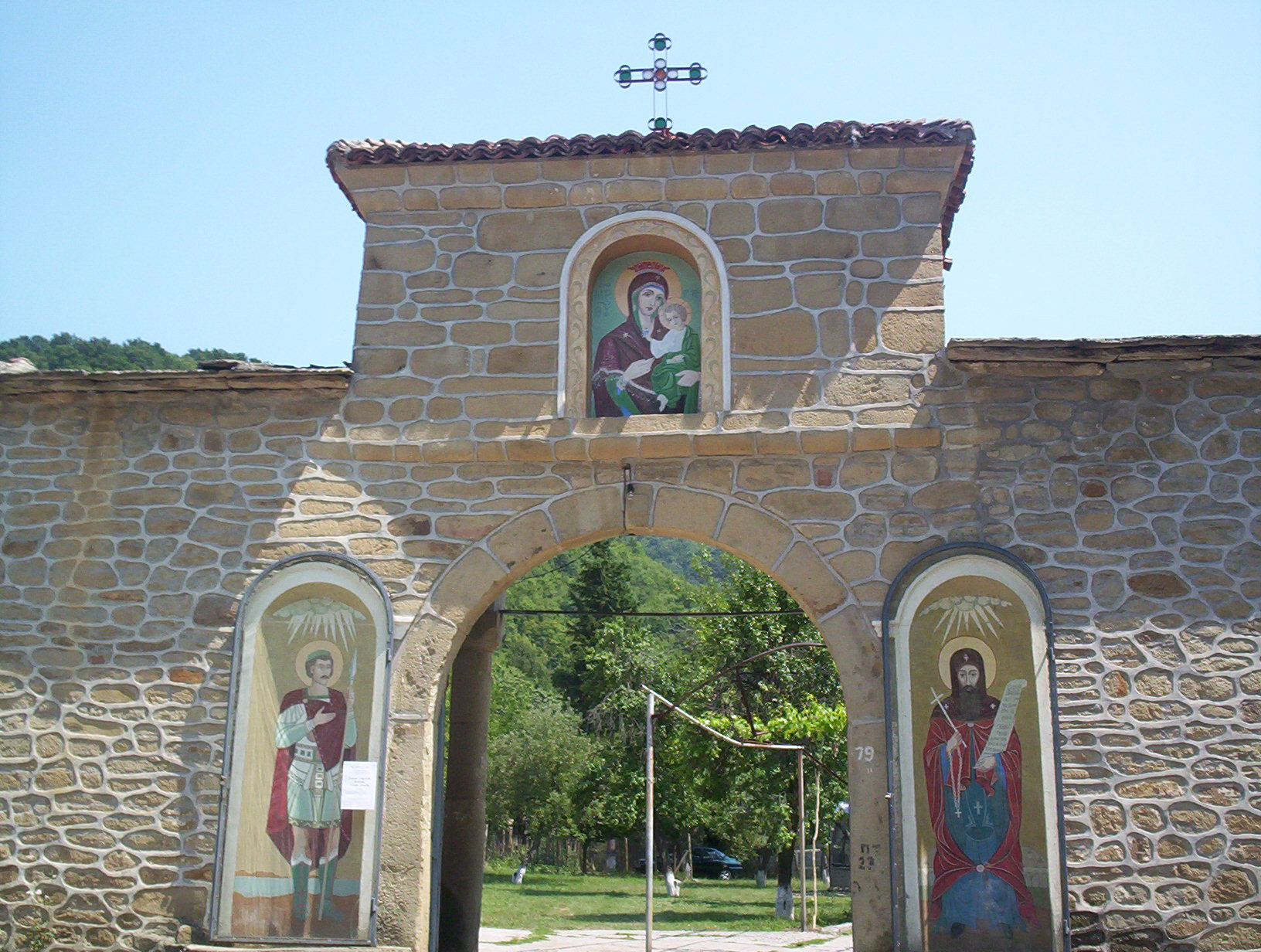
Entrance to the Kilifarevo Monastery

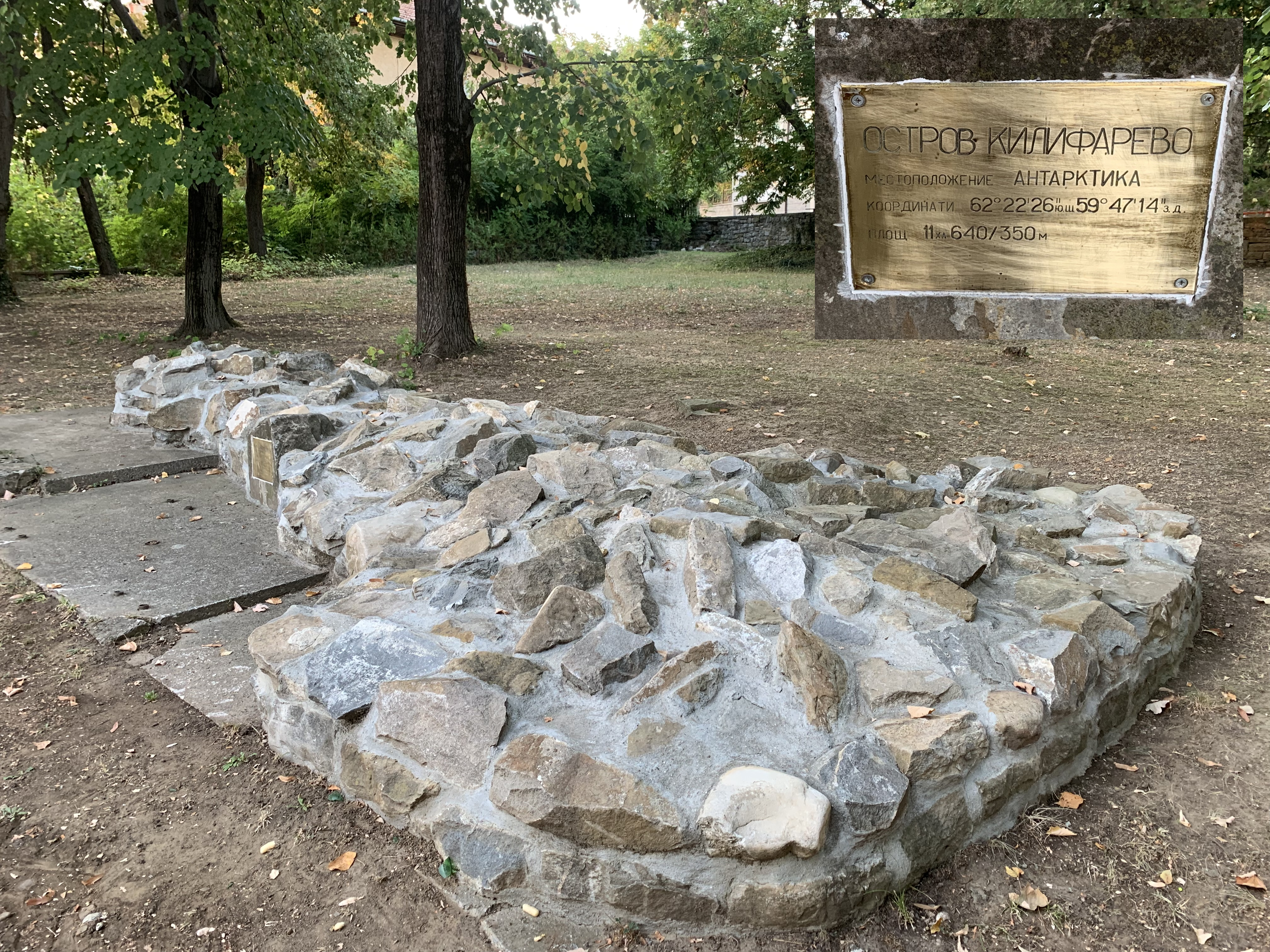
Model of Kilifarevo Island in Antarctica Park, Kilifarevo
