= Azov Flotilla =

Former Russian naval force

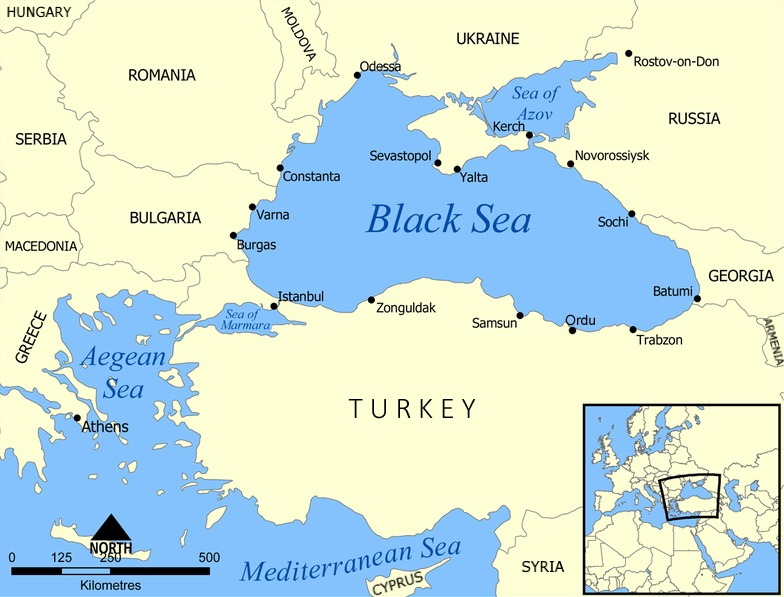
location of the Sea of Azov

The Azov Flotilla or Azov Naval Flotilla was the name given to several Russian naval forces operated on the Sea of Azov - as part of the Imperial Russian Navy, by both the Workers' and Peasants' Red Fleet and the White Russians during the Russian Civil War of 1917 to 1923, and as part of the Soviet Navy during World War II.

== Russia's first Azov flotilla ==
The first Azov Flotilla or Azov Fleet comprised Russia's first naval force. Built from 1695 to 1711 at the behest of Tsar Peter I, it started its existence in Voronezh and first saw action in the Second Azov Campaign in 1696.

== Russo-Turkish War ==
The flotilla was first formed in 1768 for the Russo-Turkish War (1768-1774) under the command of vice-admiral Alexei Senyavin. It was disbanded in 1783 and its ships handed over to the Black Sea Fleet.

== Russian civil war ==
During the Russian Civil War, the Bolsheviks formed the flotilla in April 1918 to fight the Germans and the White Guards. As early as the end of June, the flotilla was destroyed after the coastline of the Azov Sea was lost, and the crews were transferred to the Red Army. After Denikin's defeat in March 1920, the Red Army recaptured the coast of the Sea of Azov, and the flotilla was formed again under the command of S.E. Markelov and based at Mariupol. All ships that were in the ports of the Sea of Azov were included in the fleet. Barges and tugs were converted into warships. From September to November the base of theflotilla was relocated to Taganrog and after a short time back to Mariupol.

In July 1920 the flotilla included:

- 3 mine layers
- 7 gunboats
- 6 frigates
- 5 speed boats
- 7 floating batteries

A division of 4,600 men was deployed for landing operations. The tasks of the flotilla were, for example, fire support for the troops or the creation of mine barriers in the Kerch Strait. She also played an important role in defeating General Wrangel's forces. In April 1921 the flotilla was disbanded and crews and ships were taken over by the Black Sea Fleet.

In November 1920, Commander Mikhail Frunze took Crimea, pushing White general Pyotr Wrangel and his troops out of Russia. Frunze considered using the Azov flotilla to aid him, but the ships were stuck in Taganrog Bay by an early frost and took no part in the final campaign.

== World War II ==
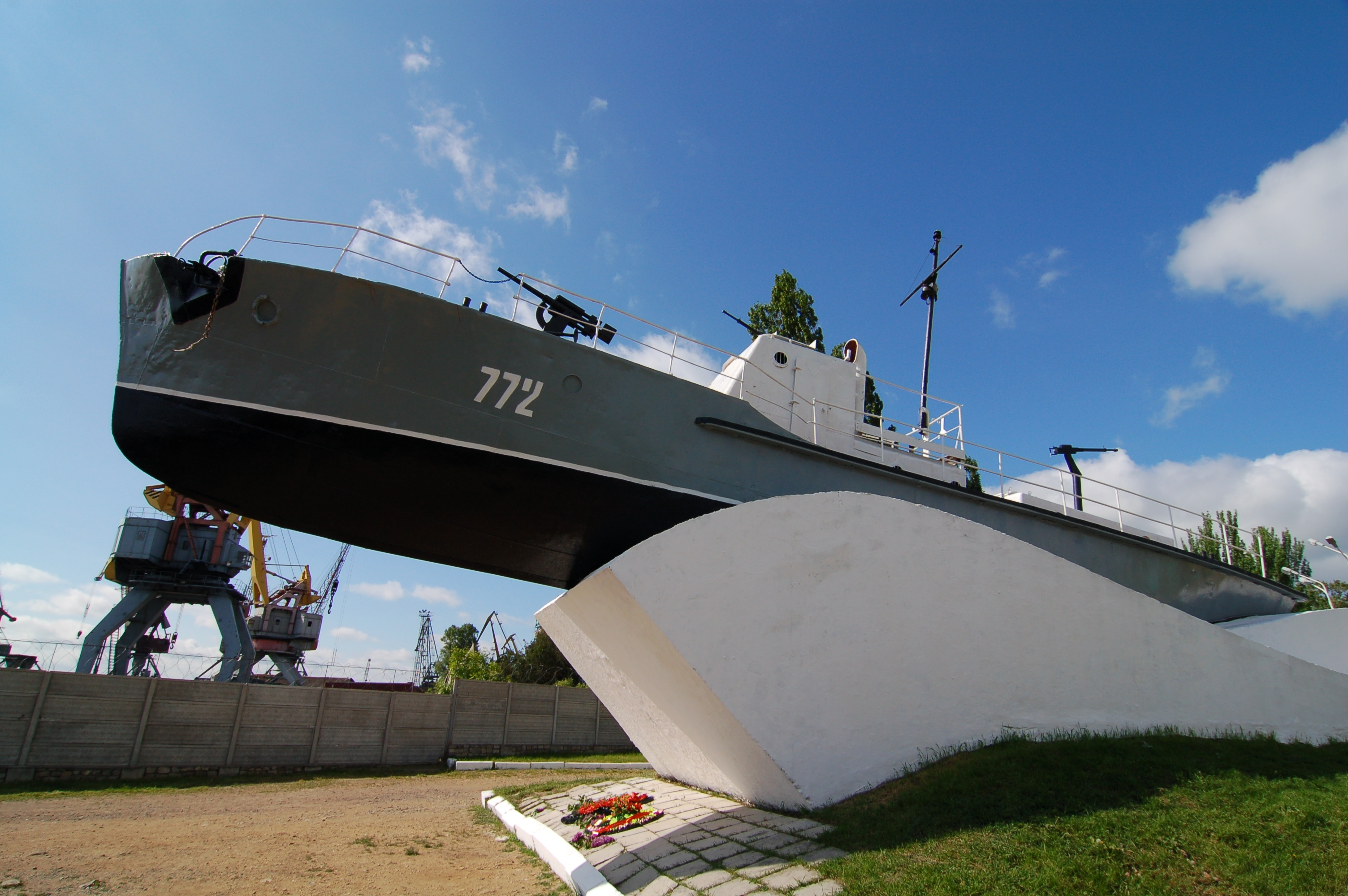
Monument to the Azov Flotilla's part in the defence of Taganrog during the Second World War.

During World War II, the Flotilla fought against German and Romanian forces as they advanced along the coast. After being chased away from its base at Yeysk by Romanian Cavalry on 8 August 1942, the Flotilla regrouped at Temryuk. In late August, as Romanian forces seized the ports of Anapa and Temryuk, most of the Flotilla was scuttled at Temryuk on 23 August, including its main warships: three gunboats (Bug, Don and Dniester), each displacing 840 tons and armed with two 130 mm guns.

The Flotilla was re-established on 3 February 1943, and the headquarters of the flotilla became Yeisk.
At that time the flotilla consisted of :

- 2 torpedo speedboats
- 15 armored boats
- 3 guard ships
- 8 minesweepers

The Akhtarsk Combat Division was established as part of the flotilla, which included a battalion of marine infantry, an infantry battalion and four anti-aircraft batteries. The flotilla was also assigned 20 Neman R-10s, 12 Ilyushin Il-2s, a fighter squadron with seven Il-2s and a flight reconnaissance squadron with five Beriev MBR-2s.

The flotilla supported various landing operations and participated in the liberation of Mariupol and the Taman Peninsula. During the Kerch–Eltigen Operation, ships of the flotilla landed troops of the 56th Army northeast of Kerch. In January 1944, three more tactical landings were made on the Crimean coast. From November 1943 to April 1944, the flotilla performed supply tasks for the Separate Coastal Army in the Kerch area. In the Battle of the Crimea, they transported troops to the Crimea and dropped landing forces on the flanks of the German enemy.

In April 1944, the Danube Flotilla was formed from the Azov flotilla, which was disbanded.

== Flotilla Commanders ==
=== Russo-Turkish War ===
- Vice Admiral Alexei Senyavin (1768–1774)

=== Russian Civil War ===
- I.I. Gernstein (April – June 1918)
- S.E. Markelov (March – April 1920)
- E.S. Gernet (April – August 1920)
- S.A. Chwitzki (September – November 1920)
- B.L. Dandre (December 1920 – April 1921)

=== German-Soviet War ===
- Captain at sea Alexander Petrovich Alexandrov (July – October 1941)
- Rear Admiral Sergey Gorshkov (October 1941 – October 1942)
- Rear Admiral Sergey Gorshkov (February 1943 – January 1944)
- Rear Admiral Georgy Kholostyakov (January – February 1944)
- Rear Admiral Sergey Gorshkov (February 1944 – April 1944)

== See also ==
- Azov-Black Sea Flotilla
