= Platform =

Platform may refer to:

== Arts ==
- Platform, an arts centre at The Bridge, Easterhouse, Glasgow
- Platform (1993 film), a 1993 Bollywood action film
- Platform (2000 film), a 2000 film by Jia Zhangke
- The Platform (2019 film)
- Platform (art group), an interdisciplinary art group that researches the oil industry
- Platform (Australian art group), an artists group based in Melbourne
- Platform (novel), a 2001 novel by Michel Houellebecq

== Physical objects and features ==
- Carbonate platform, a type of sedimentary body
- Cargo platform, a pallet used to ship cargo and heavy machines by forklift or manual lift
- Diving platform, used in diving
- Jumping platform, naturally occurring platforms, or platforms made in an ad hoc way for cliff jumping
- Oil platform, a structure built for oil production
- Platform, a component of scaffolding
- Platform (geology), the part of a continental craton that is covered by sedimentary rocks
- Platform (shopping center) in Culver City, Greater Los Angeles, California
- Theatre platform, a standard piece of theatrical scenery
- Platform mound, an earthwork intended to support a structure or activity
- Platform shoe, a kind of shoe with a thick sole
- Railway platform, an area at a railway station to alight from/embark on trains or trams

== Politics ==
- Party platform, a list of principles held by a political party
- Platform (Mali), an alliance of pro-government paramilitary groups in the Mali War

== Technology ==
- Platform economy, a contemporary business model based upon apps and websites
- Technological platform, a set of technologies
  - Computing platform, a framework on which applications may be run
  - Digital platform (infrastructure), a software-based online infrastructure that facilitates user interactions and transactions
  - Web platform
- Platform game, a genre of video games
- Car platform, a set of components shared by several vehicle models
- Weapons platform, a system or structure that carries weapons

== Other uses ==
- Economic platform, an intermediary in a two-sided market
- Platform (business model), a business model that creates value by facilitating exchanges between two or more interdependent groups
- Platform conodonts, a type of conodonts with highly evolved feeding elements
- Platform, a shopping mall in Bangkok

== See also ==
- The Platform (disambiguation)
- Platform 4, a theatre company in Hampshire, England
- Platform release, a gradual film distribution strategy
- Platforming (disambiguation)
- Platformism, a form of anarchist organization that seeks unity from its participants
- Plateforme (comic book), a 2014 comic book by Alain Dual
- "Platforms", a song by M.I.A. from AIM (album)
