= Tinko Simov =

Bulgarian anarchist and revolutionary

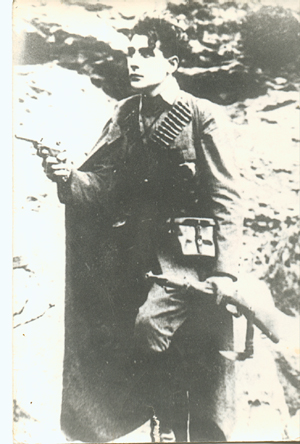
- Born: 1887; Balgarene, Levski Municipality, Kingdom of Bulgaria
- Died: 19 November 1935 (aged 48); Balgarene, Levski Municipality, Kingdom of Bulgaria
- Cause of death: Suicide by gunshot
- Organization: FAKB (Federation of Anarchists-Communists in Bulgaria)

Tinko Simov (Bulgarian: Тинко Симов) was a Bulgarian revolutionary from Balgarene, Lovech Province. Georgi Balkanski called him the Bulgarian anarchist revolutionary who fought in secrecy for the longest time. He was a part of a number of anarchists groups and was a founder of the anarchist guerrilla group, Guéroïa. Among his most frequent collaborators were Vasil Popov, Georges Popov, Vassil Ikonomov, and Georges Cheïtanov. He also wrote poetry, for example his poem about the revolutionary struggle, Не беснейте властелини.

Simov refused to take part in the First and Second Balkan Wars, for which he was jailed. He succeeded in escaping, and afterward supported the agitation from the leftist parties against Bulgarian intervention in the First World War. After the war Simov was freed and began working in Gorna Oryahovitza. He took part in the transport strike of 1919. During the 9th of June coup he was in Pleven, arrested and interned in Balgarene.

After the St Nedelya Church assault in April 1925, he became increasingly radical and active in anti-government groups. He came into contact with Vasil Popov, with whom he created an anti-government guerrilla group of anarchists and communists Guéroïa. In 1924 and 1925, many anarchist groups fled to the west, but Simov and Popov remained in Bulgaria. On November 23, 1925, Simov led an attack on the city governments of the villages of Balgarene and Kazachevo. In 1927, they attempted to rob the Zemedelska Bank in Troyan. In the ensuing firefight Popov, heavily wounded, reputedly killed himself in order to avoid capture. Simov escaped. In 1928 Simov became the head of another small group of anarchists and communists. Pressured by police prosecutions, the group fled to Yugoslavia. In the ensuing years, Simov traveled throughout Europe, searching for connections with other anarchist organizations. In 1934 he returned to Bulgaria and made attempts to resurrect his activities without much success. There he hid for some time in the village of Lomec, Troyan. In 1935 his hideout was surrounded by the police, but heavily wounded he still managed to escape. Simov came after back to Balgarene, where he hid in a barn for several days. After a betrayal, the police yet again surrounded him and during the firefight he killed himself.

== Sources ==
- Balkanski, Georges (Georgi Grigorov), G. Cheïtanov: pages d'histoire du mouvement libertaire bulgare, Editions "Notre Route", 1965
- Даскалов, Дончо (Daskalov, Doncho). Анархизмът в България. Унив. изд-во "Св. Климент Охридски, 1995
- Notre Route, Bulgaria, 1952
- Obshtestvo i pravo, Sŭi͡uz na i͡uristite v Bŭlgarii͡a, 1993
- Pavlevski, Konstantin. Nelegalen dnevnik. Voen. izd-vo, 1989
- http://bgvesti.com/index.php?option=com_content&view=article&id=33307:2009-06-28-15-22-00&catid=51:2008-09-17-19-36-54&Itemid=104
