= Anselme Bellegarrigue =

French anarchist (1813–c.1869)

Anselme Bellagarrigue
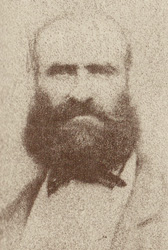
- Born: March 23, 1813; Monfort, France
- Died: c. 1869 (aged 55–56); San Salvador, El Salvador
- Notable work: Anarchist Manifesto

Anselme Bellegarrigue (23 March 1813 – c. 1869) was a French individualist anarchist. He participated in the French Revolution of 1848, was author and editor of Anarchie, Journal de l'Ordre and Au fait ! Au fait ! Interprétation de l'idée démocratique. His 1850 Anarchist Manifesto is recognized as the world's first manifesto of anarchism.

== Biography ==
=== Early life ===
According to his close friend Ulysse Pic, he went to the Lycée d'Auch for some time, then traveled in order to make his own education: between 1846 and 1848, he visited North America, via New York City, Boston, New Orleans and the West Indies. These travels convinced him of the advantages of democracy and individual liberties.

Catalan historian of individualist anarchism Xavier Diez reports that during his travels in the United States "he at least contacted Henry David Thoreau and, probably Josiah Warren".

=== Participation in the 1848 French Revolution ===
Anselme Bellegarrigue came back to France on 21 February 1848, the day before the events that would end the reign of Louis-Philippe I. He participated in the revolt but never ceased criticising the direction taken by the movement from the day following the end of the July Monarchy: as a young worker passes by saying "This time, we won't be robbed of our victory!" (a reference to the July Revolution that had failed to install a regime satisfying workers' demands), he responds: "Ah, my friend, the victory has already been robbed: hasn't a temporary government been declared?".

He also participated in the Société Républicaine Centrale (also called Club Blanqui), where he accused all of the political parties of the French Second Republic of having hijacked the popular revolt into more authoritarianism and central concentration of power, calling them "the pox of nations". He refused to call the historical period a revolution, instead saying of it that "the evolution of 1848 has only been a consolidation of what was meant to be abolished" because "a Revolution must be the ruin not of a government, but of all government". While he was participating in a society composed mostly of socialist thinkers, he opposed all authoritarian measures and all social measures because he considered that any governmental intervention can be shown to be slavery of some by some others, or a violent conflict between men: "Anarchy is order, government is civil war".

He even mentioned concepts of civil disobedience and voluntary servitude:

A democrat is not one who commands, but one who disobeys.
You thought to this day that there were tyrants? Well! You were in error, as there only are slaves: where no one obeys, no one commands.

In 1849 he founded the Association des Libres Penseurs in Meulan with some childhood friends, including Ulysse Pic (who then called himself Pic Dugers), in order to publish anarchist pamphlets; but the arrests of several members slowed and finally put an end to these activities.

=== Anarchist publications ===
Anselme Bellegarrigue published, edited and authored several anarchist texts. In 1848, between October and December he published Au fait ! Au fait ! Interprétation de l'idée démocratique in Toulouse. With Ulysse Pic he edited Le Dieu des riches et le Dieu des pauvres and Jean Mouton et le percepteur.

He was also an editor for the daily La Civilisation from March 1849, a local newspaper selling about 2000 copies. For his friends of the Association des Libres Penseurs, he wrote an article titled « L'anarchie, c'est l'ordre » (Anarchy is order) in the 3 April 1850 issue of La Voix du Peuple, but this issue's publication was interrupted.

Later he wrote, edited and self-published his Anarchie, Journal de l'Ordre of which two issues appeared due to low readership: the third issue, containing a study on the origin of wealth, was never published. According to Sharif Gemie, this journal constitutes the very first anarchist manifesto in the world

In 1851, he started writing a novel: "Le Baron de Camebrac, en tournée sur le Mississippi", published episodically until 1854, and an essay: "Les femmes d'Amérique" describing his observations on American society.

He participated in the writing of the Almanach de la Vile Multitude in 1851 and prepared an Almanach de l'Anarchisme for the year 1852, which was never published due to the French coup of 1851.

=== Return to America ===
By the establishment of the French Second Empire, Anselme Bellegarrigue went back to America, in Honduras, where, according to Max Nettlau, he was a professor, then in San Salvador where he is said to have participated in the government.

== Bellegarrigue's anarchism ==
For anarchist historian George Woodcock "Bellegarrigue stood near to Stirner at the individualist end of the anarchist spectrum. He dissociated himself from all the political revolutionaries of 1848, and even Proudhon, whom he resembled in many of his ideas and from whom he derived more than he was inclined to admit". Bellegarrigue's "conception of revolution by civil disobedience suggests that in America Bellegarrigue may have made contact with at least the ideas of [Henry David] Thoreau".

"At times Bellegarrigue spoke in the words of solipsistic egoism. "I deny everything; I affirm only myself.... I am, that is a positive fact. All the rest is abstract and falls into Mathematical X, into the unknown.... There can be on earth no interest superior to mine, no interest to which I owe even the partial sacrifice of my interests". Yet in apparent contradiction, Bellegarrigue adhered to the central anarchist tradition in his idea of society as necessary and natural and as having "a primordial existence".

== See also ==
- Anarchist Manifesto
