= Elvira Boni =

Brazilian anarchist (1899–1990)

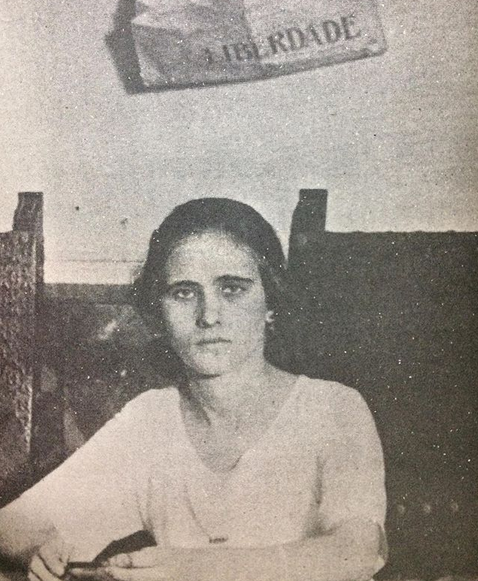
- Elvira Boni c. 1920
- Born: Elvira Boni de Lacerda; 1899; Espírito Santo do Pinhal, São Paulo, Brazil
- Died: 1990 (aged 90–91); Rio de Janeiro, Brazil
- Occupation: Seamstress
- Organizations: Union of Seamstresses; Hatters and Associated Classes
- Movement: Anarcha-feminism, anarcho-syndicalism

Elvira Boni de Lacerda (Espírito Santo do Pinhal, 1899 - Rio de Janeiro, 1990) was a political activist and strike leader. She defined herself as the "lady of the last century". She was the daughter of Italian immigrants from Cremona, Angelo Boni and Tercila Aciratti Boni. She had her first contact with socialist ideas at home, with her father who was a metal worker, and her brothers. At the age of eight, she moved with her family to the city of Rio de Janeiro in the Cordovil neighborhood. Elvira had to leave school to take care of one of her siblings who fell ill and, therefore, did not complete primary school. At age 12, she started working as an apprentice in a sewing workshop. She married Olgier Lacerda, one of the founders of the Brazilian Communist Party (PCB), in which she also participated in its activities, but without joining.

In 1909, as a result of the spread of anarchist ideas, the Anticlerical League was founded in the then federal capital. The League carried out intense activity, including a campaign called “Where is Idalina?”, which lasted two years, denouncing Father Faustino Consoni for the rape and death of Idalina de Oliveira, a minor. In the midst of all this unrest, Elvira got started in union and political life.

After going through some sewing workshops, Elvira had to decide between setting up her own business or doing union work - then deciding on union work. In May 1919, she founded, with other professionals, the Union of Seamstresses, Hatters and Associated Classes, promoting a victorious strike for the sector.

== Family and early years ==
Elvira was born in 1899 in Espirito Santo do Pinhal, the daughter of Italian immigrants from Cremona, Angelo Boni and Tercila Aciratti Boni. She had her first contact with socialist ideas at home with her father who was a metal worker. At the age of eight, she moved with her family to the city of Rio de Janeiro in the Cordovil neighborhood. Due to an illness that one of her brothers contracted, Elvira had to drop out of school and, as a result, did not complete primary school.

Elvira always had direct contact with sewing, when she was little she watched her mother sewing on a hand machine straight from Italy. Soon after, her father presented them with the best machine available at the time, a Singer cabinet. At the age of 12 she started working as an apprentice in a sewing workshop. So, at 17, 18 years old, Elvira was already sewing for herself and her sisters. Sewing at that time emerged as one of the main activities performed in the home by women who had children, but who needed to work.

She grew up in a domestic milieu with a libertarian bias, her father, Angelo, came closer to anarchism thanks to a friendship made with a Spanish shoemaker named Francisco Carrillo and an Italian named Stefano Guacchi, with whom he discussed whole nights about articles he had read in Italian newspapers. These friends were responsible for introducing Angelo to the 'Dante Alighieri Socialist Circle' founded in Pinhal.

Her mother, a practicing Catholic, also approached anarchist ideas under the responsibility of her husband, who when he found an interesting article on anticlerical themes would read it to her. Elvira's entire family, therefore, related to anarchism in some way, an example of which was her brother, who was once arrested for propagating the Jornal Espartacus in Rio de Janeiro which also resulted in his dismissal from his job.

== Professional and union life ==
At age 12, she began working as an apprentice in a sewing workshop on Rua Uruguaiana. At first, Elvira did not receive a salary and after a while she started to receive 10 thousand réis a month. She already knew the Anticlerical League, headquartered at Av. Marechal Floriano. At that time (1911-1912), the working day began at 8 am and ended at 7 pm, but when the work was too much, it continued until between 8 pm and 10 pm.

Amidst the turmoil after the founding of the Anticlerical League and the spread of anarchist ideas, Elvira got started in union and political life. She went through several sewing workshops, until then she had to choose between setting up her own business or just doing union work. Due to the high expense of becoming a businesswoman, and also the low amount her small sewing workshop gave her, Elvira was unable to pay her female employees properly and so chose to dedicate herself only to union work.

In May 1919 she founded, with Elisa Gonçalves de Oliveira, Carmen Ribeiro, Isabel Peleteiro, Noêmia Lopes, Aida Morais and other professionals, the Union of Seamstresses, Hatters and Associated Classes, still in the first moment of the feminist movement in Brazil, this Union formed part of the anarchist workers' movement, which proclaimed the situation of women in factories and workshops.

The headquarters of the Union operated in the former headquarters of the "Tailors Union of Rio de Janeiro". Elvira Boni was given the task of reading the opening speech, which was later published in the Jornal do Brasil. Three months later, the Union organized the association's first initiative - a victorious strike for better wages and an eight-hour working day. Many strikers were punished with dismissal. Nevertheless, despite the repressive measures, the workers continued their union activities. The strike was reported by Jornal do Brasil as “the strike of luxury bees”.

In 1920, Elvira chaired the working table of the 3rd Brazilian Workers Congress, and also its closing session, which took place in the same year.

It is possible to notice in the photo, which was published in the Jornal Voz do Povo on May 1, 1920, the high number of women present at the congress. On the table, however, there was only Elvira. From there, it is possible to notice the importance that Elvira acquired within the labor movement, as she was chosen to chair the opening table of the Congress, and also to speak, being much applauded by those present at the end of her speech. The worker who had not even finished primary education had the respect of the working class, staking her place in the political discursive spheres there.

She presented anarchist and anticlerical plays, performed by amateur groups on the stages of the halls of workers associations in Rio de Janeiro. In 1921, on the recommendation of José Oiticica, she joined the Pro-Flagelados Russos Committee, which aimed to assist populations victims of the drought in Russia, which occurred after the Civil War. In the period 1921–1922, she participated in the magazine Renovação, directed by the Portuguese Marques da Costa, giving her name as the person responsible for the vehicle (since the director was a foreigner, which was not allowed at the time). In one of the magazine's articles, entitled A Festa da Penha, after showing the happy but also sad side of the promise-takers, climbing the Penha Staircase on their knees, Elvira Boni ended with the following statement: "And you, women, who are indispensable to the success of any initiative, you must impose yourself by abandoning all these manifestations of vice and depravity; you must combine all your efforts, seeking education as the main factor for a conscious victory, and alongside men, train in battalion of a society where the jail is replaced by the School and hate does not exist instead of love".

Elvira also wrote frequently for the newspaper O Operário from 1912 onwards. It is possible to observe in her seven published texts an anticlerical stance (which combats the political, moral or social influence of the clergy), even defending free love and the choice of partners, as can be seen in this excerpt from her article entitled O divórcio, from October 1912 - "It seems incredible that this Jesuitada in a frock coat and so many others in a cassock are so concerned with the resolution that half a dozen have taken of men to repel the prejudices of the infernal Mother Church in the clash of struggles (...): they still try to impose their will on the private lives of those who find themselves divorced from their prejudices".

Along with Noêmia Lopes (also founder of the Union), she was determined to represent the Union of Seamstresses, and was also appointed treasurer between 1919 and 1922, when the organization ended up closing due to lack of interest among women in participating in the union movement.

With the divergences between the founders of the Brazilian Communist Party and the anarchists, Elvira Boni moved away from the libertarian movement.

== Marriage ==
During her participation in a working class theater group, Grupo Dramático 1º de Maio, in 1917, Elvira met the merchant Olgier Lacerda, one of the founders of the Brazilian Communist Party (PCB), whom she married some time later.

Her marriage coincided with the closure of the Seamstresses Union, when Elvira stopped working outside the home, and continued to work at home, not only doing housework, but also some small sewing jobs, such as producing men's pants and vests. Between 1925 and 1929, the couple lived in Rio Grande do Sul. They had two daughters - Vanda Lacerda (Brazilian theater, film and television actress) and Zeni Lacerda (Balle dancer at the Teatro Municipal in Rio de Janeiro). On account of the children, during this time, Elvira participated little in political activities. But even so, she became involved in Socorro Vermelho, an international communist organization whose main objective was to collect and channel funds for families of persecuted and imprisoned workers. Despite being a great collaborator of the communist cause, Elvira never really joined the PCB. In 1938, she went to live in the city of Rio de Janeiro in Santa Teresa. There, in 1949, she founded with other women the Women's Association of Santa Teresa, which developed an important community work for the protection of children, seeking improvements for the neighborhood.

Elvira died in Rio de Janeiro in 1990.
