= Patrick Read =

Irish anarchist (1899–1947)

- Read during his time fighting in Spain
- Born: Patrick Joseph Read; 25 February 1899; Irish Sea (born in transit between Dublin, Ireland and Liverpool, England)
- Died: 16 November 1947 (aged 48); Chicago, Illinois, United States of America
- Occupation: Journalist
- Military Service
- Allegiance: Canada; Second Spanish Republic
- Branch: Canadian Expeditionary Force; Anti-Treaty IRA; International Brigades
- Units: XIV International Brigade; The "Abraham Lincoln" XV International Brigade
- Conflicts: World War I; Irish Civil War; Spanish Civil War

Patrick Joseph Read (25 February 1899 – 16 November 1947) was an Irish anarchist who served in World War I, the Irish Civil War and the Spanish Civil War. He is sometimes incorrectly called Reid or Reade.

== Early life ==
Patrick was the son of Christopher Patrick Read and Emma McKay, both originally from Dublin, Ireland. In 1898, they emigrated to England. Patrick was born on the ship they took to Liverpool.

In 1912, the family emigrated to Canada. When the family returned to England in 1915, Patrick remained in Canada. He quickly joined the Canadian Army.

== World War One ==
Read served in the Canadian Expeditionary Force in a transmission unit. His unit's role was to lay telephone lines between the different army units as radio units were not generally available.

Read reportedly joined around 1915 and served for three years, including time on the Western Front. It is speculated in his obituary, which was published in the Industrial Worker newspaper, that he married while in France and had a child (who is thought to have died in World War II). During his time in France, he was likely introduced to the ideas of Anarcho-Syndicalism.

== Interwar Period ==
Following the end of his service, Read returned to Canada before moving to the United States of America. In 1919, while in the US he became involved in the Industrial Workers of the World, an international labor union founded in 1905 in Chicago. The union combines general unionism with industrial unionism, as it is a general union whose members are further organized within the industry of their employment. The philosophy and tactics of the IWW are described as "revolutionary industrial unionism", with ties to both socialist and anarchist labor movements. In 1921, he returned to Ireland and took up residence in Cork City, where he worked as a freelance journalist tied to the Cork Examiner.

While in Ireland, Read became involved in the Communist Party of Ireland (CPI) and joined the Anti-Treaty Side (Irish Republican Army) in the Irish Civil War. Read identified with espoused Irish labour leader James Connolly, who was an Irish Republican and Socialist leader. Connolly was part of the Industrial Workers of the World and founded the Irish Socialist Republican Party. Read served on the executive committee of the CPI and advocated for Syndicalist positions to be adopted by the party. Read clashed with CPI party leader Roddy Connolly (son of James Connolly) who would later expel Read from the party. Read believed that Roddy Connolly allowed the far-left in Ireland play a subservient role to the Nationalist Movement.

By 1924, at the age of 25, Read left Ireland for England where he remained until 1932. Read returned to the United States where he reconnected with the IWW. He became the Editor of the Industrial Worker, the official newspaper of the IWW. Read founded the Council for Union Democracy, based in Chicago in the 1930s and 1940s. This group was influenced by the IWW, helping trade-unionists combat the corruption and violence that afflicted many labour organizations. Fellow board members were Jack Sheridan and Sidney Lens.

== Spanish Civil War ==
Read is reputed to have been among the first group of Americans to sneak over the French border to Spain to join the war, following the closure of the border, around 5 February 1937. When he arrived, Read was offered a leadership position due to previous World War One military experience. Read declined, citing his anarchist beliefs as the reason. Read was often at odds with those he served beside due to his ideologies.

Read transferred from his initial placement with French volunteers in XIV International Brigade over to the Lincoln Battalion of the XV International Brigade, which was considered more tolerant of dissenting political views. Read was known for his anti-Stalinist beliefs, refusing to bow to the Soviet Union on left-wing political matters. While in Spain, Read became a member of Confederación Nacional del Trabajo, the militant Spanish Labour union.

As he had done during World War I, Read's role in the Spanish Civil War was transmissions.

Read left Spain on 5 December 1938, aboard the President Roosevelt.

== Later life ==
Following the end of the Spanish Civil War and the defeat of the Republican forces, Read returned to Chicago where he resumed his position as Editor of the Industrial Worker. Read died at the age of 48 on 16 November 1947 of a cerebral hemorrhage.

== See also ==
- Jack White
- John Creaghe
