= Philip Josephs =

New Zealand Jewish anarchist (1876–1946)

Philip Josephs (25 November 1876 – 26 April 1946) was a Jewish anarchist, anti-militarist, radical bookseller and tailor active in the New Zealand labour movement. He was a member of the Wellington branch of the New Zealand Socialist Party, ran their economics class and contributed to their paper, the "Commonweal". He helped revive the Anti-Militarist League in Wellington in 1912, and was elected secretary. On 9 July 1913 he helped launch New Zealand's first anarchist collective, Freedom Group, which lasted for a year. He was arrested during a police raid for possessing banned literature in 1915.

== Early years ==
Josephs was born in the port city of Liepāja, Latvia (then Russia) on 25 November 1876. Little is known of his early years, but it is likely he left Latvia due to the Tsarist pogroms of the 1890s.

In 1897 Josephs was in Glasgow, Scotland, marrying Sophia Hillman on 27 November. They had 4 children in Glasgow before emigrating to Wellington, New Zealand in 1903.

== Wellington, New Zealand ==
After arriving in New Zealand in 1904, Josephs spoke at demonstrations supporting the 1905 Russian Revolution, and joined the New Zealand Socialist Party in 1906. According to "The Commonweal" Josephs was "the originator and convenor" of their Economic classes. Josephs also spoke on anarchism as part of their weekly Sunday evening lectures.

Josephs also acted as the main distributor of radical and anarchist literature, such as Mother Earth and Freedom, and was in regular contact with anarchist Emma Goldman. Through his tailor shop and through various distributors across New Zealand, he used it as a distribution centre for anarchist and free communist pamphlets and periodicals, and imported literature by anarchists and communists in Britain and the United States, and journals from figures such as Goldman.

Although not a member, Josephs actively supported the New Zealand Industrial Workers of the World (IWW), which formed in 1908 in Wellington. "With the help of our anarchist friend and comrade P Josephs" wrote Tom Barker in 1913, "I had 11 propaganda meetings in 14 days".

He also helped revive the Anti-Militarist League in Wellington in 1912, and was elected secretary.

On 9 July 1913 at Josephs' tailor shop, New Zealand's first anarchist collective, Freedom Group, was formed. They held weekly meetings on topics such as "Will Social Democracy Succeed in the Economic Emancipation of the People?", and according to folklore, engaged with running battles with Police during the Great Strike of 1913.

During the First World War it appears that Josephs' shop was, or had been, the Wellington headquarters of the IWW. Any postage to the IWW Local was received care of Josephs. On 8 October 1915 both Josephs' home in the Wellington suburb of Khandallah and his Cuba Street shop in central Wellington were raided by the Police. As well as "eleven newspapers in foreign print", the Police found numerous IWW material, including "a number of unused official membership books, rubber stamps, and other gear used in connection with that constitution", as well as IWW pamphlets. Josephs was arrested but released later that same day. Along with other anarchists his mail was also censored during the First World War.

In 1921 Josephs was naturalised as a New Zealander, shortly before leaving with his family for Sydney, Australia. He died in Katoomba, Sydney 26 April 1946.
