= Julio López Chávez =

Mexican leader of peasant rebellion

- Known for: Peasant revolt

Julio López Chávez led a peasant rebellion in the late 1860s. He was a follower of Greek proto-anarchist Plotino Rhodakanaty, who moved to Mexico to organize peasants. When a land speculator drained Lake Chalco, López Chávez led up to 1,500 affected tenant farmers (campesinos) in an attempted overthrow of the oligarchic Mexican landowners. The 1867–1869 revolt spread through four Mexican states before Benito Juárez ordered federal intervention. López Chávez was killed before a firing squad. His translated last words were, "Long live socialism!"
