= Mariola Sirakova =

Bulgarian anarchist (1904–1925)

- Мариола Сиракова
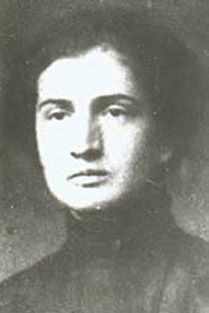
- Born: 14 August 1904; Kilifarevo, Veliko Tarnov, Bulgaria
- Died: 28 May 1925 (aged 20); Belovo, Pazardzhik, Bulgaria
- Cause of death: Execution
- Resting place: Nova Zagora
- Organization: Kilifarevo Cheta
- Movement: Anarchism, anti-fascism

Mariola Milkova Sirakova (Bulgarian: Мариола Милкова Сиракова; 1904-1925) was a Bulgarian anarchist and anti-fascist partisan. A member of an anarcho-communist Cheta in Kilifarevo, she participated in the resistance to the fascist government of Aleksandar Tsankov. She was arrested while attempting to escape the country and executed by the Internal Macedonian Revolutionary Organization (IMRO).

== Biography ==
Mariola Sirakova was born in Kilifarevo on 14 August 1904, the daughter of the district chief of Veliko Tarnovo. During her school years, she spent her free time acting in a local theatre troup, where she was first exposed to the ideas of anarchism. One night, while doing a performance for schoolchildren in Tarnovo's Russian cemetery, she met the anarchist poet Georgi Sheitanov and the two fell in love. Her increased involvement in anarchist activism resulted in her neglecting her education, and she was forced to repeat a year at school. She decided to quit school and went to Ruse, where she joined an agricultural commune established there by anarchists. Her parents attempted to get her away from the anarchists and complete her education, enrolling her at a school in Pleven.

In the wake of the 1923 Bulgarian coup d'état, civil unrest broke out throughout the country, with a popular uprising being declared in Kilifarevo. Sirakova's father, a former army captain, headed the village's military commission and declared himself against the uprising. At this time, Sirakova herself was caught sheltering the anarchist leaders Vasil Popov and Valko Shankov in her apartment in Pleven. She was arrested by the police, who tortured and raped her, but she never confessed any information and was released. In June 1924, she returned to Kilifarevo, where she reunited with Sheitanov and joined the local anarcho-communist Cheta, treating their wounded and supplying them with food, medicine and clothing. She was arrested by local authorities on suspicion of participating in the Cheta, but was again released. She decided to go underground in order to avoid police detection.

During the repression that followed the St. Nedelya Church assault, in April 1925, the Kilifarevo Cheta was forced to disband. Sirakova and Sheitanov departed for the Bulgaria–Turkey border, but they were arrested on 26 May while crossing through Sliven Province. Together with their accomplice Mina Vassileva and her daughter Maryka, who had sheltered the couple in Nova Zagora, they were put on a train towards Sofia, under the pretext that they were to be put on trial. But on 28 May, the train stopped in Belovo. The prisoners were handed over by the police to a detachment of the Internal Macedonian Revolutionary Organization (IMRO), commanded by Yonko Vaptsarov, who executed them and buried them in a mass grave.

== Legacy ==
In 1948, after the establishment of the People's Republic of Bulgaria, the mass grave was exhumed and the bodies were examined, discovering blunt trauma in their skulls that indicated they had been killed with hammers. Due to Sirakova's anarchist affiliations, the communist government prevented her remains from being taken back to Kilifarevo and instead re-buried her in a common grave for murdered anti-fascists in Nova Zagora. In 1980, Sirakova's brother Georgi Sirakov wrote a biographical essay about her, her involvement with the Cheta and her execution.
