= Anarchist Manifesto =

1850 work by Anselme Bellegarrigue

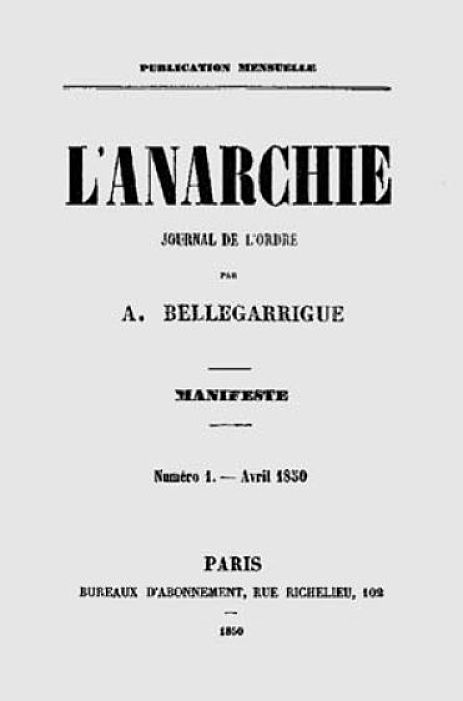
- First Edition in French
- Author: Anselme Bellegarrigue
- Original title: L'Anarchie journal de l'ordre
- Genre: Philosophy
- Publication date: April 1850

Anarchist Manifesto (or The World's First Anarchist Manifesto) is a work by Anselme Bellegarrigue, notable for being the first manifesto of anarchism. It was written in 1850, two years after his participation in the French Revolution of 1848, and ten years after Pierre-Joseph Proudhon's seminal What Is Property?. It was translated into English by Paul Sharkey and republished in 2002 as a 42-page political pamphlet by the Kate Sharpley Library with an introduction placing the manifesto in historical context by Anarchist Studies editor Sharif Gemie.

== Publication history ==
- Bellegarrigue, Anselme Manifeste de l'Anarchie, L'Anarchie, Journal de l'Ordre, Issue 1, April 1850.
- Bellegarrigue, Anselme (2002). Anarchist Manifesto. London: Kate Sharpley Library. ISBN 978-1-873605-82-0.

== See also ==
- The Communist Manifesto
- List of books about anarchism
