= Azov-Black Sea Flotilla =

- Азовсько-Чорноморська флотилія
- Active: 1919
- Country: Ukraine
- Allegiance: Makhnovshchina
- Branch: Revolutionary Insurgent Army of Ukraine
- Type: Flotilla
- Garrison/HQ: Berdyansk
- Engagements: Ukrainian War of Independence

The Azov-Black Sea Flotilla was a formation of the Makhnovist fleet, the main area of which was the Sea of Azov.

== History ==
In the spring of 1919, the Makhnovists occupied Berdyansk, where they began to form a navy from adapted civilian ships, on which weapons were installed.

In late April - early May 1919, several sailors received a three-inch (76-mm) cannon and appeared in front of the Berdyansk Revolutionary Committee with the initiative to install it on a boat that could be used to patrol the waters of the Azov Sea. But the boat was in very poor condition. Engineers called for its examination and confirmed their suspicions that the cannon should not be put on the boat. After the second or third shot, the boat was guaranteed to leak and sink. The sailors stubbornly argued the opposite - that the boat would withstand the load. In the end, ignoring the opinion of the engineers, they independently mounted a cannon on the boat and began to go out to sea. Almost immediately, the Berdyansk boat was assigned to the Revolutionary Insurgent Army of Ukraine.

On 21 May 1919, in connection with the appearance of the enemy fleet near Berdyansk, a telegram was sent to the headquarters of the 2nd Ukrainian Soviet Army from the headquarters of the 1st Insurgent Division with the signatures of the chief of division Nestor Makhno and senior assistant chief of staff B. Veretelnik. It contained an request of small caliber guns for ships and large caliber guns for the Coast Guard to be sent to Berdyansk to protect the port and city navy. "Delay can be the cause of great complications," noted Makhno.

At the same time, in May 1919, three ships were stationed at the Aleksandrovsk pier on the Dnieper under the control of the Makhnovists. The group of these ships was called the Azov-Black Sea Flotilla. The flotilla commander was Kamchatny, who was only waiting for Pavel Dybenko with his Crimean Red Army to knock out the White Guards from the Kerch Peninsula in order to withdraw the ships at the mouth of the Dnieper and try to deliver them to Berdyansk. However, this plan was never implemented.

== See also ==
- Azov Flotilla
- Black Sea Fleet
