= Plotino Rhodakanaty =

Greek and Mexican socialist and anarchist (1828–1890)

- Born: Plotino Constantino Rhodakanaty; 14 October 1828; Athens, First Hellenic Republic
- Died: 2 February 1890 (aged 61); Mexico City, Mexico
- Education: University of Vienna

Plotino Constantino Rhodakanaty (Greek: Πλωτίνος Ροδοκανάτης; 14 October 1828 – 2 February 1890) was a Greek and Mexican socialist and anarchist, as well as a prominent early member of the Church of Jesus Christ of Latter-day Saints (LDS Church) in Mexico. He is known as one of the first advocates for anarchist thought in Mexico. He was also an early activist in Mexico's mid-nineteenth century labor and campesino movement, which foreshadowed the Mexican Revolution in 1910. Rhodakanaty moved to Mexico in 1861 after being drawn to the country's rural system of small, self-governing agricultural communities. He published various books and essays about the threats of privatization and capitalism, and helped establish an "escuela libre" ("free school") in Chalco. After coming across a pamphlet containing materials published by the LDS Church in 1875, Rhodakanaty became one of the first people to be baptized into the church in Mexico. He conducted efforts to bring his friends and colleagues into the church, and was ordained an elder and leader of the local congregation before becoming disillusioned with the church in 1880 following the rejection of his plan to turn Mexico into a "utopian society".

== Early life ==
Rhodakanaty was born on October 14, 1828, in Athens, First Hellenic Republic. His father was a member of the Greek aristocracy, and his mother was Greek with Austrian citizenship. Rhodakanaty's father died near the end of the Greek War of Independence, and Rhodakanaty went with his mother to Vienna. There is some speculation with regards to Rhodakanaty's family and origins. Moses Thatcher, an apostle of The Church of Jesus Christ of Latter-day Saints, stated in 1880 that the mother of Rhodakanaty had been born in Mexico. Some believed that Rhodakanaty was a Mexican who had adopted a persona and foreign identity; others believed that he was born in London.

Rhodakanaty studied medicine in Austria and Berlin before traveling to Budapest in 1848 to assist in the failed Hungarian Revolution. He traveled next to Berlin, where he was exposed to the ideas of Hegel, Fourier, and Proudhon. He journeyed to Paris in 1850 specifically to meet Proudhon, after reading the latter's What Is Property?, where he stayed for seven years. While in Paris, he learned of Mexico's rural system, consisting of relatively self-governing agricultural communities, and of the threat being posed to the people by capitalism and privatization. He then traveled to Barcelona to learn Spanish and prepare to move to Mexico, spending at least two years in a large anarchist community there. While in Spain, Rhodakanaty published his first philosophical work, titled De la Naturaleza, and worked to formulate a plan to preserve the agrarian way of life in Mexico.

== First years in Mexico ==
Rhodakanaty arrived in Mexico in 1861, and within the year he published La Cartilla Socialista and began propagating the ideas of contemporary European thinkers, particularly those of Fourier, Proudhon, and Bakunin. La Cartilla Socialista lays out Fourier's program for agrarian socialism, and begins by asking: "What is the most elevated and reasonable goal that human intelligence can be devoted to? The achievement of universal association, of individuals and peoples, in order to fulfill the earthly purposes of humanity".

He published other radical essays, including Neopanteísmo, and founded various scholarly journals. In 1870, Rhodakanaty helped establish La Escuela del Rayo y del Socialismo, an "escuela libre" in Chalco. The term "escuela libre" was used by anarchists in order to distinguish themselves from government and church-influenced education. The school was run by a disciple of Francisco Zalacosta. In 1871, a former student of the school named Julio Lopez Chavez helped organize a peasant uprising, the manifesto of which—based heavily on anarchist ideas developed at the school—blamed the church, government, and landlords for the peasants' hardships. It was the first revolt in Mexico which called for the overthrow of the government, in favor of locally-controlled land redistribution and a decentralized system of autonomous villages with a common defense force based on libertarian principles.

In order to support himself, Rhodakanaty taught at the Colegio de San Ildefonso in Mexico City, where he organized like-minded students. A circle of followers emerged among his pupils, including Santiago Villanueva, Francisco Zalacosta, Julio Chávez López, and José María Gonzales. These people and others would later form an important nucleus in the early Mexican labor and peasant movements.

== Involvement with the LDS church ==
As religious curiosity began to grow among intellectuals in Mexico City, Rhodakanaty first turned his attention to the Protestants, who sold their goods in order to make them available to the church and distribute them as an example of the spread of the Gospel. However, he considered the Protestants to be materialistic, cold, fatalistic, and monarchical with regards to their division between the elect and the reprobate.

In 1875, Rhodakanaty came across and read various translated sections of the Book of Mormon, a religious text of the Church of Jesus Christ of Latter-day Saints (LDS Church), and gained a conviction about it being "the word of God". In addition to the values advocated by the LDS Church, he was also attracted to their communitarian practices at the time, which included communal property and an emphasis on self-reliance. He wrote in 1878 to the headquarters of the church in Salt Lake City, Utah, and requested additional church literature, as well as for missionaries to be sent to Mexico. His petitioning for missionaries, as well as his efforts to convert his friends and acquaintances, were instrumental in the subsequent establishment of the LDS Church in Mexico. During the three years between his discovery of the church in 1875 and the arrival of missionaries in 1879, Rhodakanaty had organized a group of twenty or so other interested people, who would meet together in his home each Sunday to study church literature.

Rhodakanaty was baptized into The Church of Jesus Christ of Latter-day Saints—along with eight others—on November 20, 1879, and shortly after was ordained an elder and appointed to lead the local congregation. He disapproved of the violence in Mexico associated with the insurrections, but believed that the church would surely institute their proposed United Order there, which would essentially follow his plan to turn the country into a utopian society. When this did not happen and he did not receive the church's support for his plan, his disappointment led him to leave the church. He resigned as head of the congregation in Mexico City in August 1880, and on May 2, 1881, he published an article titled "Social Reform", which was critical of the church.

== Later years ==
Following his resignation from the church, Rhodakanaty continued his attempts to implement his utopian socialist vision in Mexico with little success. One reason was that the politics of Mexico became increasingly stifling for radicals, especially so for foreigners like Rhodakanaty. He had an aversion for violence and a naïve hope that the wealthy would voluntarily transition to the new society he hoped to create, and because of this, the leadership of Mexican radicalism and anarchism increasingly passed to younger hands, many of whom were his former students.

In his old age, he moved to Ajusco in the mountains southwest of Mexico City. He taught there throughout the time that Otilio Montaño, the author of Emiliano Zapata's famous Plan de Ayala, attended as a student. The Plan de Ayala closely related Rhodakanaty's goal of a democratic and self-governing society in rural Mexico. Many report that Rhodakanaty left Mexico to return to Europe in 1886, but there is no evidence confirming his return to Europe.

In 2019, his death certificate was found, indicating that he had in fact died in Mexico of a fever on February 2, 1890.
