= Luisa Lallana =

Argentine dockworker

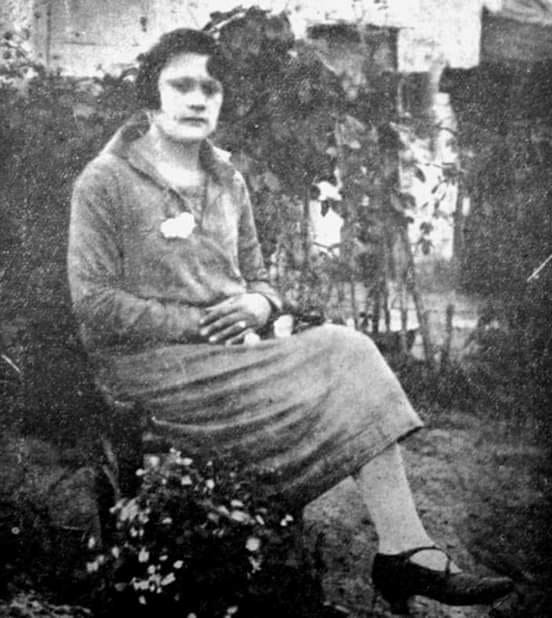
- Born: 1910
- Died: 8 May 1928 (aged 17–18); Rosario, Santa Fe, Argentina
- Cause of death: Murder by gunshot
- Occupation: Dockworker
- Organization: Argentine Regional Workers' Federation
- Movement: Anarchism in Argentina

Luisa Lallana (1910 – 8 May 1928) was an Argentine dockworker. An anarcho-syndicalist activist affiliated with the Argentine Regional Workers' Federation (FORA), she was murdered by a strikebreaker during a labour dispute in 1928. She immediately became known as a revolutionary martyr and her murder sparked a general strike that resulted in a pay increase for dockworkers.

== Early life and career ==
Born in 1910, from an early age Lallana worked in the port of Rosario as a bag maker and became involved in the Argentine anarchist movement. Before long, she had joined the Rosario branch of the Argentine Regional Workers' Federation (FORA).

== Strike and murder ==
During the 1920s, Rosario's dockworkers found themselves in a key strategic position as they were able to control the transport of goods through the port. Largely anarchist in orientation, the dockworkers came into conflict with their employers who increasingly sought to limit workplace organising in the port. On 2 May 1928, the dockers went on strike in protest against a lack of wage increases. 80% of dockworkers came out in support of the strike. While male dockworkers positioned themselves in strategic intersections of the city and confronted strikebreakers, sometimes with arms, striking women — including Lallana — formed a picket line in front of the port's gates where they attempted to convince strikebreakers to stop working.

A Port Women's Committee was established and they began distributing leaflets near the port. Lallana and Rosa Valdez, both of whom worked at the Mancini industrial plant, were among those involved in the committee. On 8 May, in response to the appeals of the women at the picket line, the strikebreaker Juan Romero attacked them, shooting and killing the 18-year-old Lallana. He made no attempt to flee as he was convinced that he had acted with impunity and that he would be protected from prosecution. The left-wing press quickly accused the Argentine Patriotic League of murdering Lallana and, holding it responsible for the rising violence against striking workers, began to call for the League's dissolution. Through La Capital, the police accused the strikers of killing Lallana, but this version of events was widely disputed.

== Funeral and aftermath ==
10,000 workers attended Lallana's funeral, organised by the Unión Sindical Argentina, it became the first in a new tradition of public anarchist funeral processions, held to denounce violence against the working class. Lallana's murder also resulted in the declaration of a general strike in Rosario which escalated into broader civil disorder. Mass demonstrations took place throughout the city, strikebreakers were attacked and looting took place.

The port employers eventually gave in to the workers' demands and increased dockworkers' daily wages by one peso. In the wake of the strike, local officials were replaced: Pedro Gómez Cello was appointed as governor of Santa Fe, and Ricardo Caballero — perceived by many of the city's workers as sympathetic to them — was also appointed as the city's chief of police. Political reforms were then made, allowing the province's women and foreign workers to vote in elections. Meanwhile, Lallana was elevated to the status of a revolutionary martyr, the first woman in Argentina to die for the labour movement.

== Bibliography ==
- Berra, Pepe (11 March 2019). "Asesinada por obrera, anarquista y feminista" [Murdered as a worker, anarchist and feminist]. Diario NEP (in Spanish).
- Ceruti, Leónidas (7 May 2015). "El asesinato de la obrera Luisa Lallana: esa maldita costumbre de matar" [The murder of worker Luisa Lallana: that accursed habit of killing]. La Izquierda Diario (in Spanish).
- Kobryn, Mila (8 November 2020). "Anarquista, solidaria y luchadora" [Anarchist, supporter and fighter]. Página 12 (in Spanish).
- Videla, Oscar; Menotti, Paulo (2013). "Las huelgas de los estibadores portuarios en el sur santafesino en 1928" [The dockworkers' strikes in the south of Santa Fe in 1928]. Sociohistórica (in Spanish) (32): 1–31. ISSN 1852-1606.
