= The Platform (Germany) =

German anarcho-communist organization

- The Platform – Anarcha-Communist Organization
- Die plattform
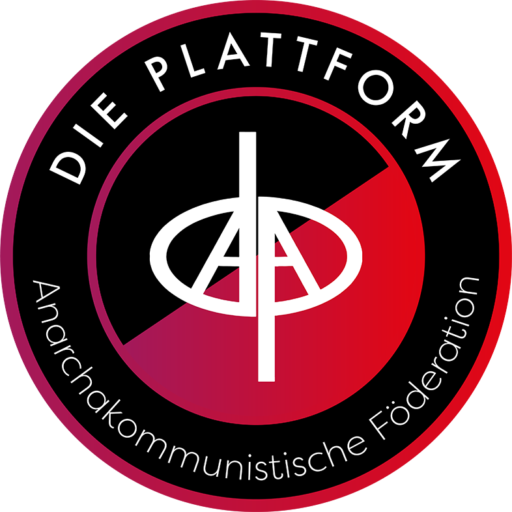
- Logo of the platform
- Abbreviation: DP
- Formation: January 2019; 7 years ago
- Type: Platformist federation
- Purpose: Communist anarchism
- Location: Germany
- Region served: Berlin, Rostock, Ruhrgebiet, Trier, Hamburg, Leipzig
- Official language: German
- Leader: Collective leadership
- Publication: Kollektive Einmischung
- Website: dieplattform.org

The Platform (German: Die plattform) is a German anarcho-communist organization founded in January 2019, which refers to the organizational form of platformism.

== Aims and objectives ==
The aim of the platform is, according to its account, "to overcome all forms of oppression and domination and to build a society without domination, class and statehood based on communist anarchism."

The platform's ideological orientation is communist anarchism, based on the ideas of Peter Kropotkin, Mikhail Bakunin, Errico Malatesta, Nestor Makhno and Erich Mühsam, among others.

Organizationally, the platform refers to the principle of platformism and uses the specific concept of "social insertion". The principles of theoretical and tactical unity, commitment, and collective activity are intended to improve the structuring of the anarchist organization and thereby make the anarchist movement more capable of action.

The reason for the founding of the platform was, according to the organization itself, a "general lack of strategy, extensive public invisibility, as well as a bad external impact" of the anarchist movement in German-speaking countries.

The platform is convinced that "the social revolution can only be achieved if (almost) all anarchist currents, approaches and tactics are present." It includes "syndicalist tactics and goals, as well as insurrectionary acts of resistance, and lived anarchist structures in the here and now."

== Activities ==
The platform relies on the concept of organizational dualism, which means that it is active within the anarchist movement on the one hand, but also gets involved in social movements outside the anarchist and left-wing radical spectrum.

According to the organization's own statements, the main focus of the work is rent and industrial disputes, as well as participation in the climate, environmental, and feminist movements.

The platform does not claim to be a mass organization, but sees this task in the social movements; the platform rejects the concept of a political vanguard.

At the local level, the platform is networked with groups from the Federation of German-speaking Anarchists and the Free Workers' Union.

The Platform is a member organization of the International Coordination of Organized Anarchism, an international network of platformist and especifist anarchist groups.

== Structure ==
The platform consists of several local groups and a supraregional group, which are networked with each other and are federally linked. There is also a group of supporters who are sympathizers. It is networked with anarchist organizations worldwide and supports in the sense of an "anti-national, limitless solidarity", among other things, anarchist opposition activists in Belarus.

== Observation by the Office for the Protection of the Constitution ==
The constitutional protection authorities have classified the organisation as left-wing extremist. As a result, the organisation is subject to monitoring and mentioned in the reports for the protection of the constitution of the states of Baden-Württemberg, Saxony-Anhalt, Brandenburg, Rhineland-Palatinate and Bavaria.
