= Organization for Revolutionary Self-Defense =

Greek militant organization in Athens

- Organismós Epanastatikís Aftoámynas
- Dates active: 25 May 2014 – 9 November 2019
- Active regions: Athens, Greece
- Ideology: Insurrectionary anarchism Post-left anarchy Anti-capitalism; Anti-police sentiment Social anarchism
- Status: Disjointed

The Organization for Revolutionary Self-Defense (Greek: Οργανισμός Επαναστατικής Αυτοάμυνας, commonly shortened to Revolutionary Self-Defense) was a Greek militant organization active in the metropolitan area of Athens. The group was dismantled after an anti-terrorist operation in November 2019.

== History and activities ==
The first attack was 25 May 2014 when members shot the headquarters on the Panhellenic Socialist Movement headquarters in Athens, Greece. There were no reported casualties and the organization claimed responsibility for the incident in an internet statement.

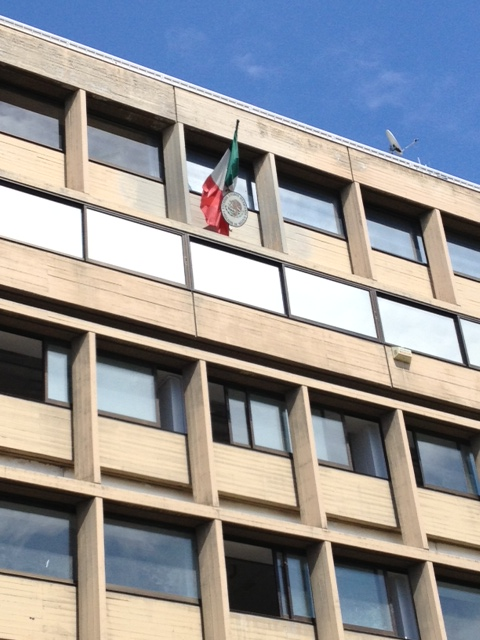
The Mexican embassy in Athens, one of the targets attacked by the group

The Revolutionary Self-Defense group claims to fight to "construct a mass internationalist revolutionary movement, by strengthening militant resistance on the entire spectrum of class antagonism". The group claimed the shooting attack against the Mexican embassy (occurred the 2 November), According to them, their purpose is "to form an international revolutionary movement", while blaming the French, Mexican and Greek states for their attitude towards refugees, social movements, the natural environment and local communities. They say that they were careful not to endanger citizens who were passing by, and they point out that the attack on the Mexican embassy occurred a week after the 20th anniversary of the assassination of anarchist Christopher Marinos by the EKAM. The second attack a police officer, who had been on guard outside the embassy, was wounded when the assailants threw a hand grenade on the French embassy building.

On 10 January 2016 an assailant opened fire on a Hellenic Police bus outside the Panhellenic Socialist Movement headquarters at the intersection of Harilaou Trikoupi Street and Arachovis Street in Athens. At least one officer was injured in the assault. The Organization for Revolutionary Self Defense claimed responsibility for the incident.

The 6th November militants shot against members of the riot police when they are parked in front of the Panhellenic Socialist Movement party headquarters in Exarcheia neighborhood, Athens, Greece. The incidents left no one injured, and militants claimed the incident days later. The group is suspected to attack the Russian embassy in Athens.

The group raised funds through bank and business robberies around the Metropolitan area of Athens, assaults being better known in OPAP gaming store in Holargos on October 21, 2019.

== Arrests ==
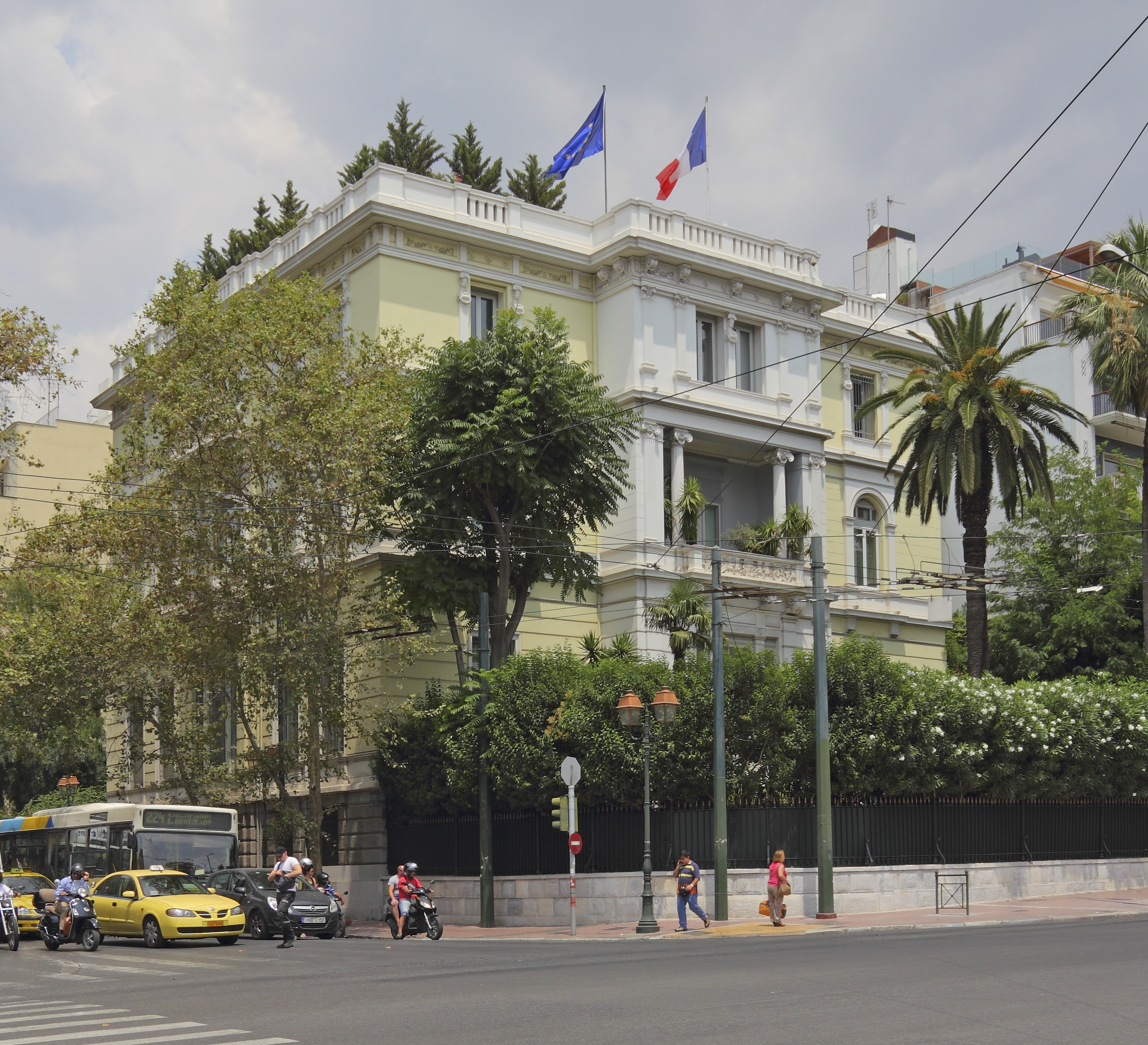
The French embassy in Athens, victim of an attack on November 10, 2016

In the 1'th November 2019, 13 homes have been reportedly raided and 15 people questioned by the counter-terrorism Department of Greek Police. Two men in their 40s were arrested on charges of terrorist acts, possession of explosives, violation of weapons law and tampering with official documents. A 39-years old woman was also arrested for violation related to arms law. Police were seeking for a suspect 46-year-old man.

According to a statement by police, the arrested appear to be involved in the break-in of a store that sold entertainment and technology games in Holargos suburb of Athens on October 21. The 41-year-old man was arrested in 2010 for membership in the terrorist group “Revolutionary Struggle” (Epanastatikos Agonas). He served a jail sentence and was released in February 2018 on remand for the rest of his sentence. In the raided homes police found and confiscated among other 5 Kalashnikov rifles, 4 hand grenades with CS gas fillers, 17 detonators (9 of them remote-controlled) and various explosives including gelatin-dynamite, also possible TNT. A ballistics examination of the weapons showed that one Kalashnikov had been used in an attack for which the “Revolutionary Self-Defense” had assumed responsibility. The authorities confirmed that the group did not plan new attacks and were staying in hiding. Days later the two suspects aged 41 and 45 were charged with five attacks related to the militant group. The suspects under the Greek law they can be detained for up to 18 months pending trial.

In August 2021 a 46 your old male was arrested in Thessaloniki as a suspected member of Revolutionary Self-Defence after an armed robbery at an Alpha Bank branch. The arrested man, who was reported to be armed with a Kalashnikov rifle, had a warrant against him for his participation in the hold up of a Holargos OPAP gaming store in 2019. The suspect was handed over to counter-terrorism police before being transported to Athens.

== See also ==
- Anarchism in Greece
