= Anarchism in Timor-Leste =

Anarchism in Timor-Leste has its roots in the country's history as a penal colony, when many anarchists were deported there. The movement eventually evolved into an anti-colonial struggle against succeeding occupying powers: first the Portuguese Empire, then the Japanese Empire and the Indonesian New Order, before the country finally achieved independence in 2002.

== History ==
Throughout the 1890s, anarchists made a series of assassination attempts against government officials and the royal family of Portugal. In response, the government introduced a law that would deport convicts to the Empire's overseas colonies after already having served their sentence, passing the new law on February 13, 1896. The Portuguese government subsequently began expelling anarchists to the colonies, including the island of Timor.

=== The anarchist movement in Timor-Leste ===
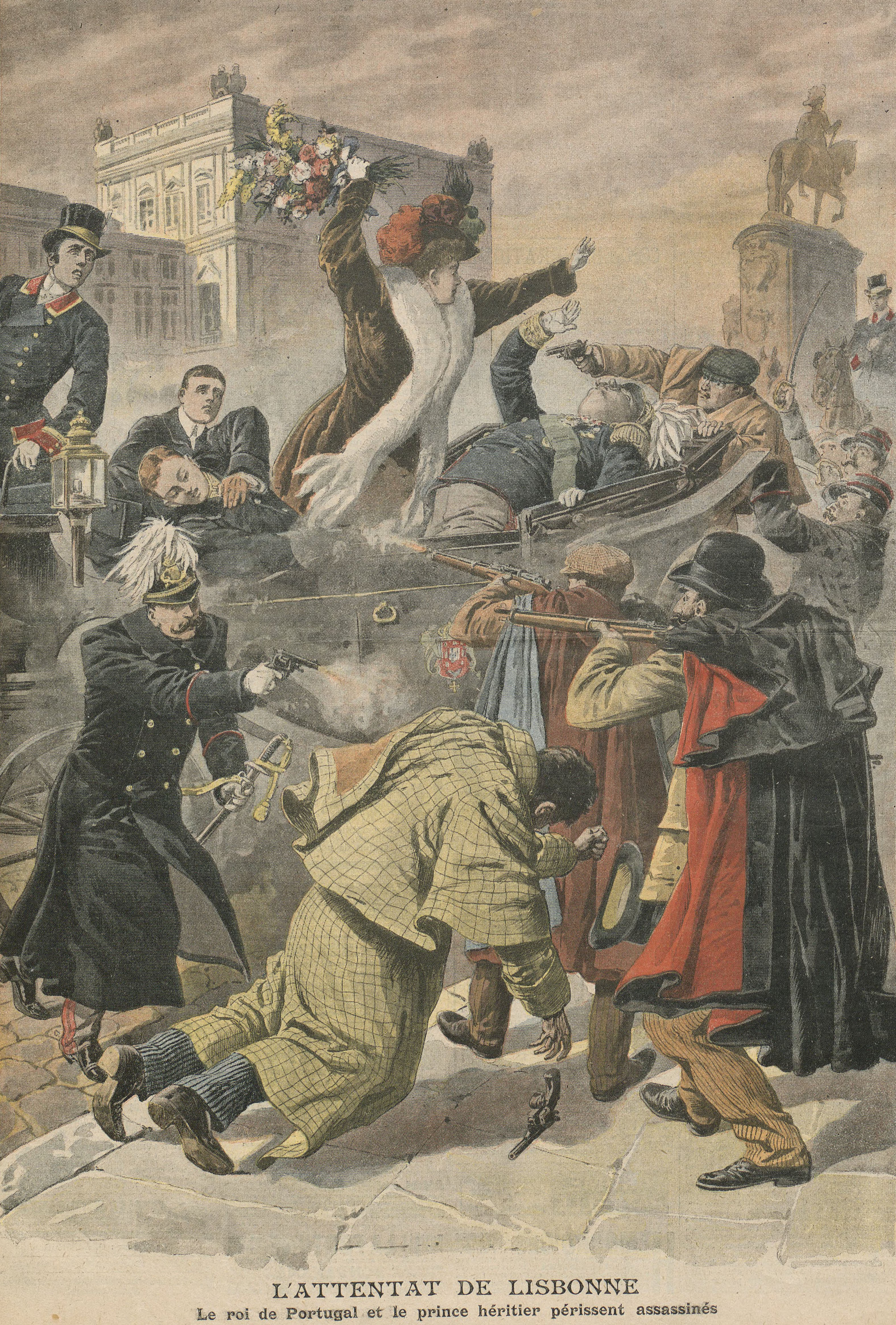
Assassination of King Carlos I of Portugal and the Prince Royal Luís Filipe, Duke of Braganza.

On September 14, 1896, a group of anarchists were deported to Timor, many of them died from infections such as malaria and yellow fever, while those that survived had to endure dire living conditions. Other anarchists were deported to Timor from Macau in January 1908 for having organized a militant group in the colony. However, this policy of deportation was not able to prevent the Lisbon Regicide, orchestrated in part by the anarchist Alfredo Luís da Costa, which saw the assassination of the King Carlos I and the crown prince Luís Filipe. This act of propaganda of the deed led to a destabilization of the Portuguese monarchist government, eventually resulting in the 5 October 1910 revolution, which overthrew the Kingdom of Portugal and established the First Portuguese Republic. The fall of the monarchy allowed for the return of many anarchists to Portugal, though a number of exiled anarchists had adapted to Timorese life, finding work and starting families in the colony.

The amnesty brought by the republican period was cut short by the 28 May 1926 coup d'état, which established a military dictatorship in Portugal. Another wave of political repression followed, seeing the arrest of left-wing activists and the deportation of detainees to Timor once again. Many workers and artisans, accused of belonging to the Red Legion, were deported on April 14, 1927. Some were taken to Cape Verde, others to Guinea and Mozambique, before eventually 75 deportees arrived at the Timorese port of Aipelo on September 25, 1927. One of these deportees was Manuel Viegas Carrascalão, a journalist from São Brás de Alportel and the general secretary of the Syndicalist Youth Federation (FJS). Of his own accord, the governor of Portuguese Timor Teófilo Duarte decided to put the deportees to work, organizing the construction of public works in the colony and giving the workers some freedoms and means of subsistence, although this lenient policy was reversed by the succeeding colonial governors.

After the Flour Uprising in February 1931 and the Madeira uprising in April 1931, the National Dictatorship intensified its repression of the opposition. 90 more people were deported to Timor on June 28, 1931, with a further 271 civilians and 87 military personnel being deported there on September 2, 1931. The deportees were placed in concentration camps in Oecusse and Atauro, where they were held for many months. Due to the deplorable conditions of the camps, a group of military veterans, some of whom were in the camps themselves, appealed to the government for the release of deportees from the camps. The military government obliged, releasing most of the prisoners from the camps and resettling them throughout the colony.

A number of anarchists among these deportees subsequently began to organize underground resistance to Portuguese colonial rule. The governor's palace was hit by an arson attack, in an attempt on the governor's life. Anarchists also established the Timor Libertarian Alliance (ALT), affiliated with the Iberian Anarchist Federation (FAI), and began publishing a Timorese anarchist newsletter from prison.

The anti-nationalist character of Timorese anarchist activism drew the attention of the new Estado Novo regime, which accused the anarchists of having a "harmful influence" on the Timorese population and of supporting riots by the native Timorese people. The Timor Libertarian Alliance was eventually discovered and repressed by the government, which confiscated the group's materials and sent some of its activists to Atauro, where they were forced to work in a limestone mine. Manuel Viegas Carrascalão was himself deported there with his family, with his son Manuel being born in captivity on the island.

When the government granted amnesty to political deportees in the colonies, it explicitly excluded many anarchists and trade unionists, whom it considered to be terrorists. The anarchists who remained in Timor experienced continued persecution, with the government ordering an investigation into their activities.

=== Japanese occupation ===
During the Pacific War, despite Portugal's official neutrality, Timor was a staging ground throughout much of the conflict. The colony was first occupied by Allied forces, before falling under Japanese occupation. The Imperial Japanese Army carried out a campaign of state terrorism against the local population, causing many anarchists (including Carrascalão) to take up arms in an underground resistance movement against the occupation. Many Timorese citizens and resistance fighters were confined in concentration camps by the occupation forces, while others managed to evacuate the island to Bobs Farm in New South Wales.

The living conditions in the Australian camp were severe, with serious cases of inequality between prisoners - who had been divided into Portuguese, clergy and native Timorese people. Many people refused to cooperate with the Australian authorities and traveled to Newcastle, where they found work and forged links with trade unions and leftist groups, including the Australian Communist Party. Anarchists that remained in the camp began causing unrest among the inhabitants, organizing wildcat strikes, and were described by the Australian authorities as “the worst type of person who was present in the camp.” People interned in the camp took up the chant of “all are equal in Australia” as all control over the prisoners was lost. On April 27, 1943, a riot took place within the camp, as many prisoners armed themselves with cutlery and attack the governing officials. At the request of a priest, the clergy were removed from the camp, while the rebellious prisoners remained. Despite attempts to separate the prisoners, on September 14, 1943, the anarchist José da Silva Gordinho declared “Now we are together, we are in the majority, we are united, and if we cannot go our own way, then we will fight.” The administration took this as an opportunity to remove many leading anarchists from the internment camp, some being sent to Newcastle to work for the Salvation Army, while others were interned at a separate internment camp in Sydney. Many of the prisoners began to go on hunger strike during early 1944, eventually causing the release of some, while others were sent to different internment camps.

The surrender of Japan brought about the end of the Japanese occupation of Timor, allowing 562 evacuees to return to the island on November 27, 1945. Many anarchists returned to Timor, while others opted to remain in Australia. The Portuguese government subsequently ordered the expulsion of deportees from the colony. They were sent back to Portugal, arriving in Lisbon on February 15, 1946, where many of the anarchists were arrested by the PIDE. Despite the defeat of the organized anarchist movement in East Timor, Manuel Viegas Carrascalão returned to the island with his family. His sons Manuel, Mário and João became influential leaders of the Timorese independence movement.

=== Indonesian occupation ===
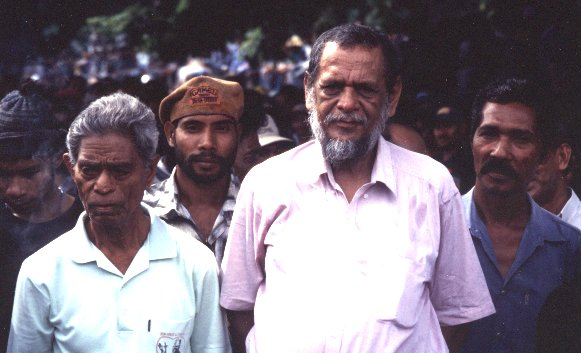
Manuel Carrascalão, one of the leaders of the East Timorese independence movement during the Indonesian occupation.

After the Carnation Revolution overthrew the Estado Novo regime and established the Third Portuguese Republic, the colonial authorities effectively abandoned East Timor, opening the door for the country's independence. After a short civil war between the Timorese Democratic Union (UDT) and the Revolutionary Front for an Independent East Timor (FRETILIN), East Timor unilaterally declared independence from Portugal. However, this independence was cut short by the invasion and occupation of East Timor by Suharto's New Order regime, annexing the country into Indonesia. The occupation saw the genocide of over 100,000 Timorese people, with some estimates placing the number as high as 300,000.

The issue of the occupation split the Carrascalão brothers politically. While Manuel stayed in the country to resist the occupation, João fled to Australia to agitate for independence in exile, and Mário entered into a direct dialogue with the Indonesian occupiers, eventually becoming Governor of East Timor.

Many Timorese people took up the struggle against the Indonesian occupation, including Nicolau dos Reis Lobato, who led the FALINTIL in a guerilla war against the occupation forces, getting killed during a battle in 1978. Xanana Gusmão was subsequently elected as the new commander of the FALINTIL in 1981, and he set about trying to unite the disparate resistance movements into a broad front against the occupation. Throughout the early 1980s, Gusmão walked from village to village trying to obtain support and recruits for the resistance. Nevertheless, in 1984, four senior FALINTIL officers led a failed coup against Gusmão, leading to him leaving the FRETILIN and supporting various centrist coalitions.

In March 1986, the UDT and FRETILIN formed an anti-occupation coalition known as the National Council of Maubere Resistance (CNRM), led by Xanana Gusmão, Manuel Carrascalão and José Ramos-Horta. On December 31, 1988, FALINTIL was declared to be the "non-partisan" armed resistance wing of the CNRM and continued to attack Indonesian occupation forces. The CNRM began a restructuring of the resistance movement, establishing the Clandestine Front to organize the Timorese population against the occupation.

On November 12, 1991, over 250 pro-independence demonstrators were shot dead in the Santa Cruz cemetery of Dili. This marked a turning point for the resistance movement, as the occupation of East Timor attracted international attention. The Indonesian military subsequently launched a campaign to capture Xanana Gusmão, who was tried, convicted and sentenced to life imprisonment in May 1993. Nevertheless, the FALINTIL continued their armed struggle throughout the 1990s.

Following the Fall of Suharto in May 1998, the United Nations intervened in East Timor, overseeing the 1999 East Timorese independence referendum and subsequent transition to independence. This resulted in pro-Indonesia militias carrying out a series of reprisals against the East Timorese people, carrying out massacres at Liquiçá Church, Manuel Carrascalão's House and Suai Church.

=== Independence ===
Timor-Leste finally became independent on May 20, 2002, and the recently released Xanana Gusmão was sworn in as the first President of Timor-Leste. Over 200,000 Timorese refugees returned to the country, and a period of reconstruction began to take place. Many Australian anarchist and syndicalist activists began to develop ties with East Timorese NGOs, which they provided with support. The Sydney Industrial Workers of the World established the East Timor Community Computer Project, collecting money to buy used computers and send them to Timor. An IWW member coordinated the project in Dili, installing computers for Timorese NGOs, far-left groups and schools. The IWW also opened a free computer school in Bebonuk and attempted to extend the project to other parts of Timor. The Sydney IWW attempted to keep the project going, organizing fundraising events, but after experiencing a series of difficulties, the project was gradually phased out.

During the 2000s, unhoused people began to squat vacant buildings throughout the country, often these were barracks that had been abandoned by the Indonesian military after the de-occupation of East Timor. On January 21, 2011, the government of Xanana Gusmão ordered the eviction of over 1,000 squatters that had taken up residence in the Brimob Barracks in Bairro Pite. According to the prime minister, they had refused to leave the government-owned land until they were compensated for doing so.

== See also ==
- Category:East Timorese anarchists
- List of anarchist movements by region
- Anarchism in Australia
- Anarchism in Indonesia
- Anarchism in Portugal

== Bibliography ==
- Chomsky, Noam (2000). "East Timor Retrospective". Rogue States: the rule of force in world affairs. London: Pluto Press. ISBN 9780745317083. OCLC 935553867.
