= Nacht =

Nacht is the German and Dutch word for night. It may refer to:

- Die Nacht (film), a 1985 West German installation film by Hans-Jürgen Syberberg
- "Die Nacht" (Strauss), an 1885 art song composed by Richard Strauss
- "Come Back, My Love" (German: "Die Nacht"), a song by Anton Rubinstein
- NACHT domain, a conserved protein domain
- Nacht Faust, a character from Japanese manga series Black Clover

== People ==
- Artur Nacht-Samborski (1898–1974), Polish avant-garde painter; see National Museum, Kraków § Collections
- Eduard Nacht (born 1939), Swiss journalist
- Isaia Nacht (1900–1976), Romanian writer and editor known as Isaia Răcăciuni
- Maximilian Nacht (1881–1973), American anarchist known as Max Nomad
- Michael Nacht (born 1942), United States government official
- Sacha Nacht (1901–1977), French psychiatrist and psychoanalyst
- Siegfried Nacht (1878–1956), Austrian-American writer, translator, and anarcho-syndicalist later known as Stephen Naft

== See also ==
- Night (disambiguation)
