= General strike =

Strike with most of the labour force

A general strike (or mass strike) is a strike action in which a substantial proportion of the total labour force in a city, region, or country participates. General strikes are characterised by the participation of workers from a multitude of workplaces across different industries, and tend to involve entire communities. They are often used to strengthen the bargaining position of a trade union or achieve a common social or political goal. General strikes first occurred in the mid-19th century and have characterised many historically important strikes.

== History ==
=== Precursors ===
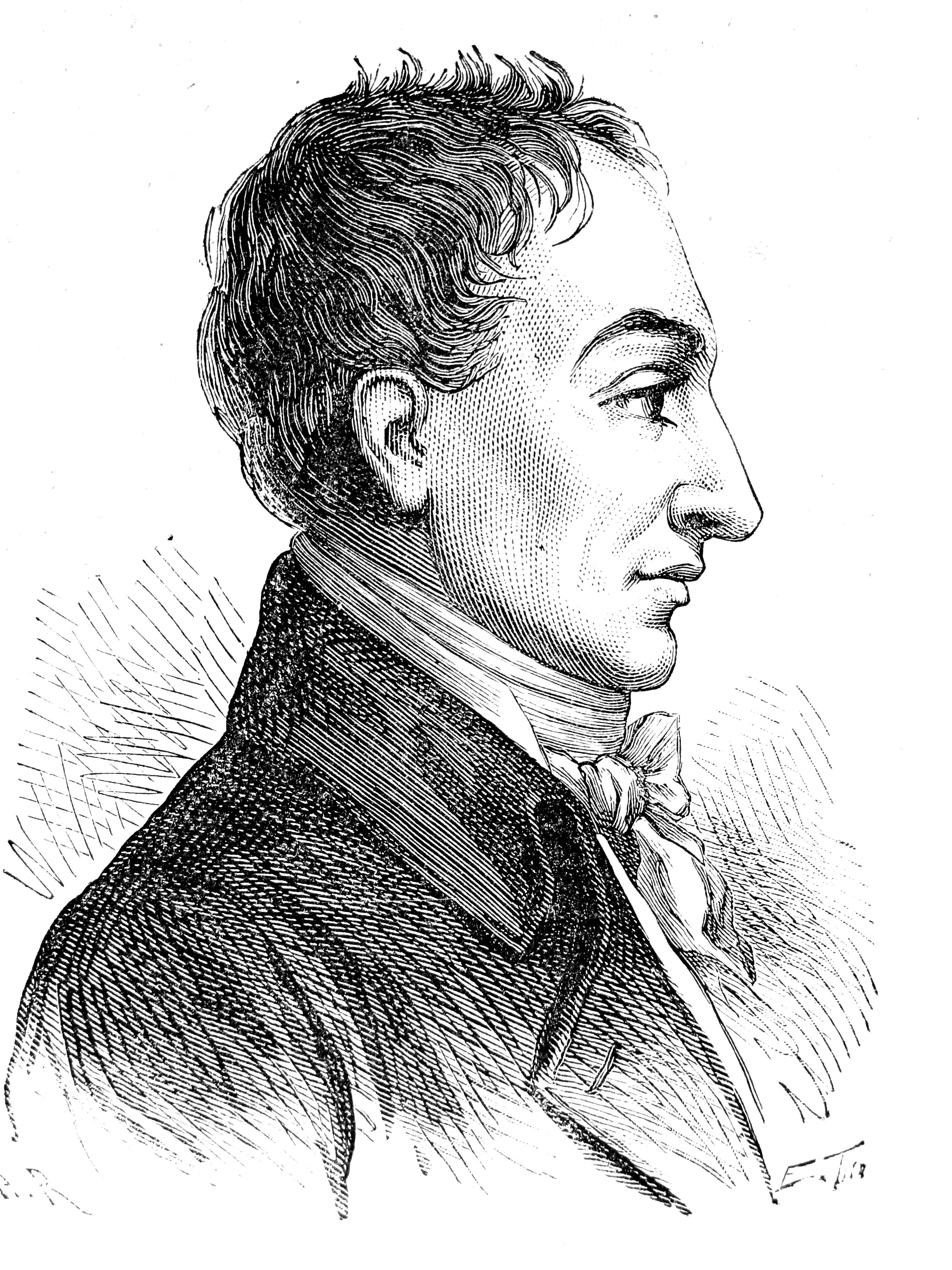
Constantin François de Chassebœuf, whose early conception of the general strike lay the groundwork for its systematic formulation in the 19th century

An early predecessor of the general strike were the Jewish traditions of the Sabbatical and Jubilee years, the latter of which involves widespread debt relief and land redistribution. The secessio plebis, during the times of the Roman Republic, has also been noted as a precursor to the general strike.

Early conceptions of the general strike were proposed during the Renaissance by Étienne de La Boétie, and during the Age of Enlightenment by Jean Meslier and Honoré Gabriel Riqueti. With the outbreak of the French Revolution, the idea was taken up by radicals such as Jean-Paul Marat, Sylvain Maréchal and Constantin François de Chassebœuf, who proposed a strike that included merchants and industrialists alongside industrial workers and farmworkers. In his essay Les Ruines, Chassebœuf proposed a general strike by "every profession useful to society" against the "civil, military, or religious agents of government", contrasting "the People" against the "men who do nothing". Chassebœuf's work held a great influence in Great Britain, where it was distributed throughout the country by the London Corresponding Society, while his chapter on the general strike was reprinted for decades after its initial publication. The idea was later taken up by the British economist Thomas Attwood and the French communist Louis Auguste Blanqui.

During the early years of the Industrial Revolution, an ill-defined conception of a general strike was expressed by workers in Nottingham and Manchester, but it lacked a systematic formulation. There were periodic strikes throughout the early 19th century that could loosely be considered as "general strikes". In the United States, the 1835 Philadelphia General Strike lasted for three weeks, after which the striking workers won their goal of a ten-hour workday and an increase in wages.

=== Conception ===
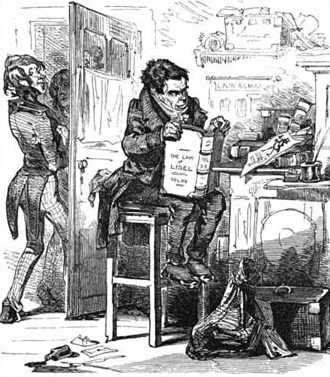
William Benbow pictured in Punch in 1848

The idea of the general strike was first formulated by William Benbow, a Quaker and shoemaker who became involved in the British radical movement of the early 19th century. After he was arrested for his political activities, Benbow turned away from reformism and began to publish a number of anti-authoritarian and anti-clerical polemics. At meetings of the National Union of the Working Classes, Benbow expressed impatience with the progress of the Reform Bill and called for armed resistance against the government.

In January 1832, Benbow published a pamphlet titled Grand National Holiday and Congress of the Productive Classes, in which he outlined his proposals for a general strike. Benbow called for workers themselves to declare a month-long "holiday", which would be financially supported first by workers' savings and then by exacting "contributions" from the wealthy. He also proposed the formation of workers' councils to keep the peace, distribute food and elect delegates to a congress, which would itself carry out wide-reaching societal reforms. Months after the pamphlet's publication, Benbow was arrested for leading a 100,000-strong demonstration, which he had intended as a "dress rehearsal" for his proposed "national holiday".

The passage of the Reform Act brought with it the collapse of the radical movement, including Benbow's National Union. But six years later, in an atmosphere of rising disillusionment with the progress of political reform, the nascent Chartist movement adopted Benbow's platform for a "national holiday". The Chartists planned to carry out their month-long national holiday in August 1839, but following Benbow's arrest, the campaign was abandoned. Benbow was tried and found guilty of sedition. Although he attempted to continue his Chartist activities from prison, after being excommunicated from the movement by Feargus O'Connor, Benbow ceased his political activities.

=== Early expressions ===
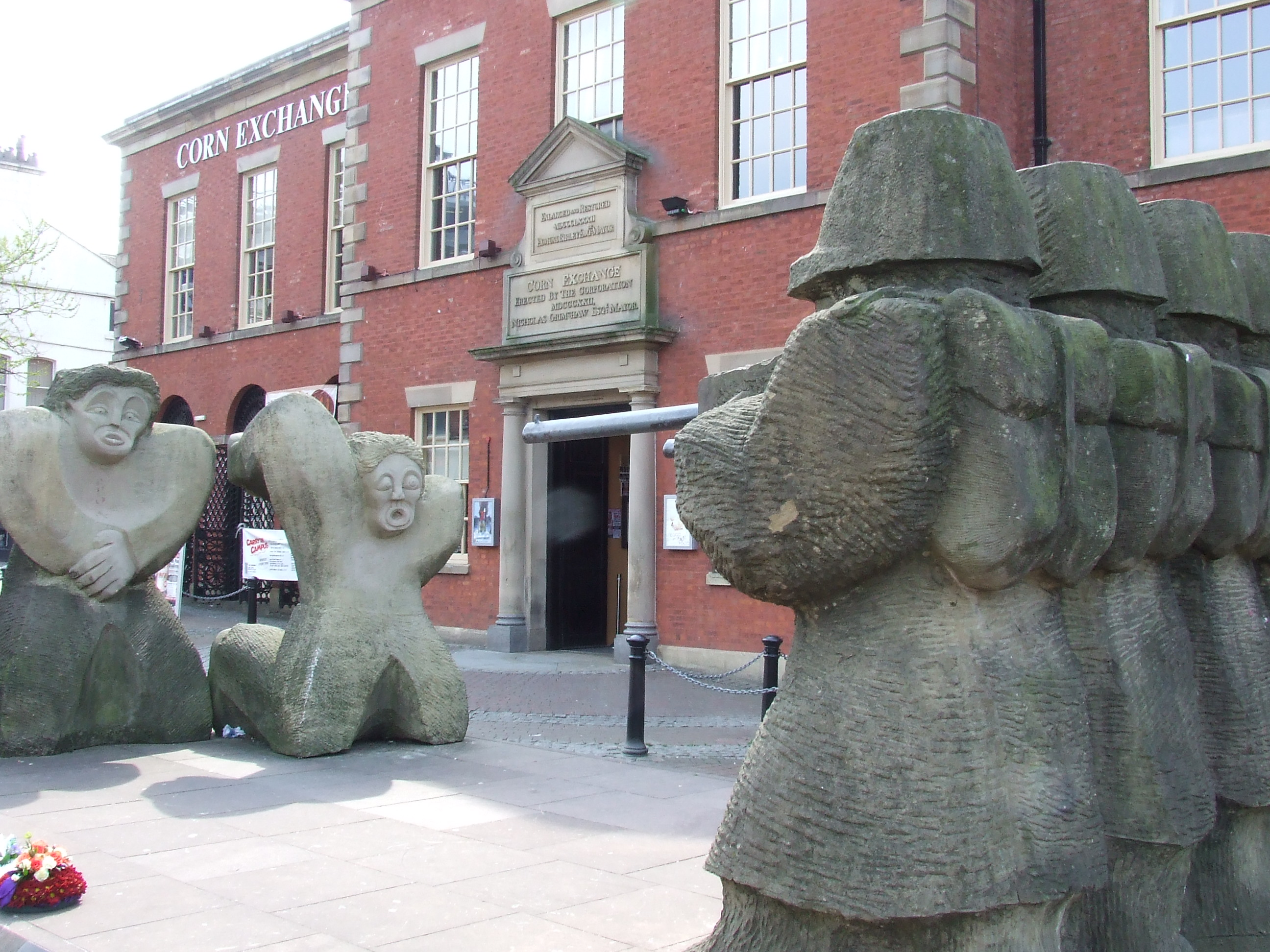
Statue commemorating the 1842 general strike

In April 1842, after the second Chartist Petition was rejected by the British Parliament, demands for fairer wages and conditions across many different industries finally exploded into the first general strike in the capitalist country. The strike began in the coal mines of Staffordshire and soon spread throughout Britain, affecting factories, mills and mines from Scotland to South Wales. Although the general strike started as an apolitical demand for better working conditions, by August 1842, it became directly associated with the Chartists and took on a revolutionary character. But government forces intervened, cracking down on the protests and arresting its leaders, eventually forcing a return to work.

Strike actions by workers in Barcelona played a prominent role in the Spanish Revolution of 1854, which gave way to a progressive period that extended a number of civil liberties to Spanish workers. But labour unrest grew as the new authorities again prohibited freedom of association and work stoppages, leading to the outbreak of the 1855 Catalan general strike, the first in Spanish history. After months of strike action and attempted negotitations, the general strike was suppressed and the draft constitution suspended in a coup by Leopoldo O'Donnell.

During the American Civil War, millions of black slaves escaped southern plantations and fled to Union territory, depriving the Confederacy of its main source of labour in what W. E. B. Du Bois described as a "general strike" in his book Black Reconstruction in America. However, this conception was argued against by African-American economist Abram Lincoln Harris, who dismissed Du Bois' claims of a general strike as fantastical. A. A. Taylor also rejected Du Bois' interpretation, noting that the flight from the plantations did not constitute an organised movement to achieve economic or political concessions. And American historian Arthur Charles Cole criticised what he described as "discrepancies between well established facts and extravagant generalization" in Du Bois' claims of a general strike.

=== Debate in the First International ===
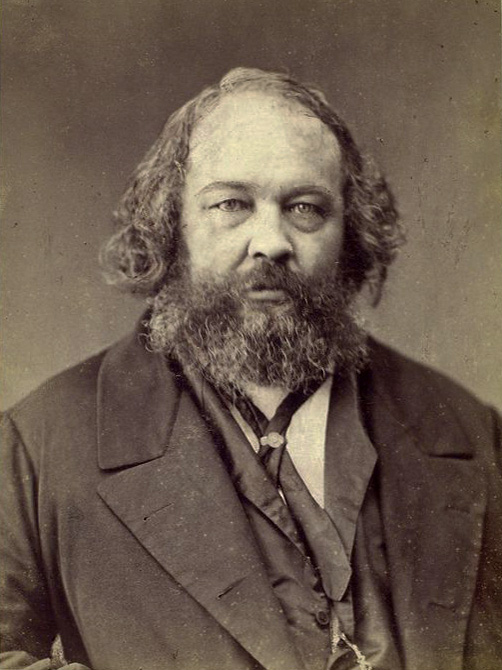
Mikhail Bakunin, leader of the anti-authoritarian faction of First International, which advocated for a revolutionary general strike to overthrow the state and capitalism

In 1864, the International Workingmen's Association (IWA) was established as a federation of trade unions by delegates from England and France. The French trade union delegates, such as Eugene Varlin, saw the nascent International as a means to coordinate support for strike actions by its members. In the first volume of Das Kapital, published in 1867, Karl Marx conceived of the general strike as a means by which to build class consciousness.

At the International's Brussels Congress of 1868, the Belgian delegate César De Paepe proposed that a general strike could be used to prevent the outbreak of war, which he considered to be a means for the ruling class to subordinate working people. He further declared that trade unions themselves constituted the mechanism for replacing capitalism with socialism, the establishment of which would put a final end to all wars. In a letter to Friedrich Engels, Marx himself rejected what he described as "the Belgian nonsense that it was necessary to strike against war". When Mikhail Bakunin joined the International the following year, he declared his own support for these proposals. Bakunin rejected political participation, instead advocating for workers to take strike actions to improve their working conditions. He argued that the International could be the organisation through which trade unions could build such strike actions into a revolutionary general strike, which would abolish capitalism and institute socialism.

The proposals for a revolutionary general strike to overthrow the state were rejected by the Marxist faction, who instead proposed the creation of political parties to take state power. Through the General Council, which had centralised control over the International, Marx moved to expel Bakunin's anti-authoritarian faction at the Hague Congress of 1872. In response, the expelled sections established the Anti-Authoritarian International, which was designed to operate according to a federal structure. The anti-authoritarians upheld the syndicalist view of using the International as a coordinating body to support strike actions and build them towards a revolutionary general strike, which would overthrow the state and establish workers' control over the means of production. This view was particularly supported by the Spanish Regional Federation, which itself organised a general strike in Alcoy, although it was quickly put down by Spanish government forces.

At the Geneva Congress of 1873, Belgian delegates proposed the adoption of the general strike as a tactic for social revolution. This motion was supported by the Jura Federation, which additionally stressed the need for smaller strikes as a means to achieve wage increases. The discussions over strike action at the Geneva Congress lay the foundations for what was to become known as anarcho-syndicalism. But before long, the anti-authoritarians began to move away from the anarcho-syndicalist model. Members of the Belgian section began to advocate for a dictatorship of the proletariat and electoralism, while the French and Italian sections moved towards anarcho-communism and proposed the theory of propaganda of the deed. By 1880, the debates within the International had led to its collapse.

=== Rise of revolutionary syndicalism ===
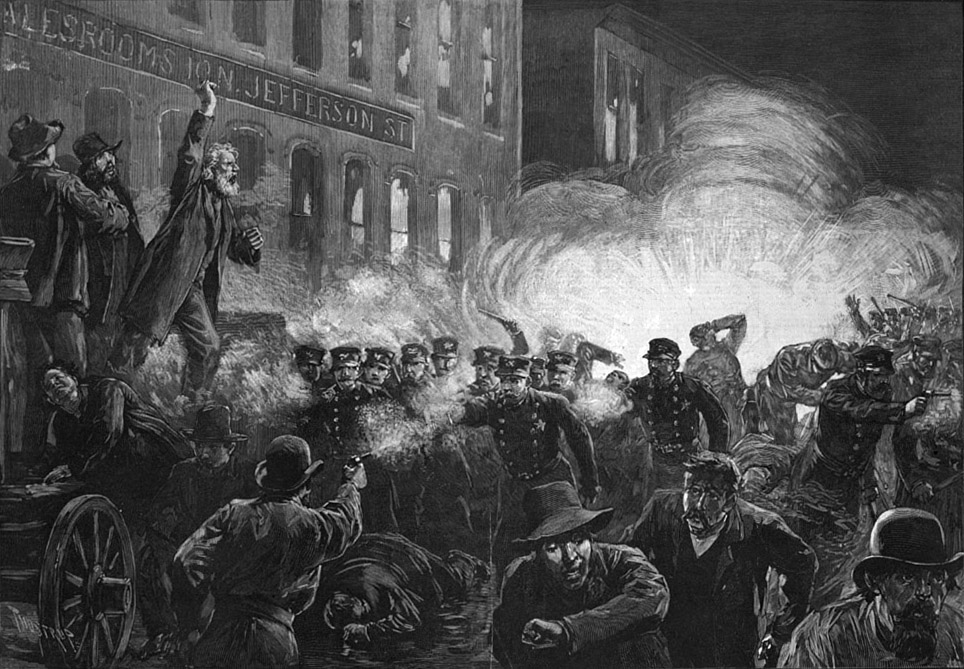
Engraving depicting the Haymarket affair of 1886

In 1881, a revolutionary socialist faction of the Socialist Labor Party of America (SLPA) split off and established the International Working People's Association (IWPA), which developed anarchist tendencies and held itself to be a continuation of the defunct IWA. Inspired by the example of the Paris Commune, IWPA members such as the Chicago anarchist Albert Parsons formulated a kind of revolutionary syndicalism that eschewed the general strike in favour of popular insurrection. In response to the repression of the Great Railroad Strike of 1877, the IWPA armed and drilled its members into workers' militias, seeing violent action as a necessary complement to strike action. On 1 May 1886, the IWPA organised a nationwide general strike for the eight-hour day, which had been a focus of demands for Parsons and the Chicago anarchists. Throughout the United States, hundreds of thousands of workers went on strike. The general strike's epicentre was in Chicago, where protests against the police repression of striking workers escalated into a riot. Eight of the protest's organisers, including Parsons, were executed by hanging on charges of conspiracy. In the wake of their execution, the IWPA demand for the eight-hour day spread around the world and 1 May was declared International Workers' Day.

Inspired by the IWPA's general strike, European anarchists began to reconsider the general strike as a revolutionary instrument, with the French anarchist Joseph Tortelier taking up the idea of the revolutionary general strike, which then spread to Italian and Spanish anarchists. Albert Parsons' wife Lucy Parsons also adopted the revolutionary general strike in her own platform, which became a founding precept of the Industrial Workers of the World (IWW). The first trade union to adopt the revolutionary general strike into its platform was the French General Confederation of Labour (CGT). The CGT launched its own campaign for workers themselves to institute the eight-hour day, culminating in a general strike which secured French workers a reduction in working time and workload, an increase in wages and the introduction of the weekend.

The CGT's example accelerated the spread of revolutionary syndicalism throughout the world, bringing with it a wave of general strikes at the turn of the 20th century, to mixed results. Although the Belgian general strike of 1893 was halted in order to prevent damage to the workers' movement, it eventually won its demand of universal manhood suffrage. Following the Cuban War of Independence, in 1902, anarcho-syndicalists organised the country's first general strike against the government of the new Republic of Cuba. In the Netherlands, the railroad strikes of 1903 resulted in harsh repression against the Dutch workers' movement. The Swedish general strike of 1909 was broken up without achieving its demands, accelerating the split of syndicalists from the social-democratic unions and the formation of the Central Organisation of the Workers of Sweden (SAC).

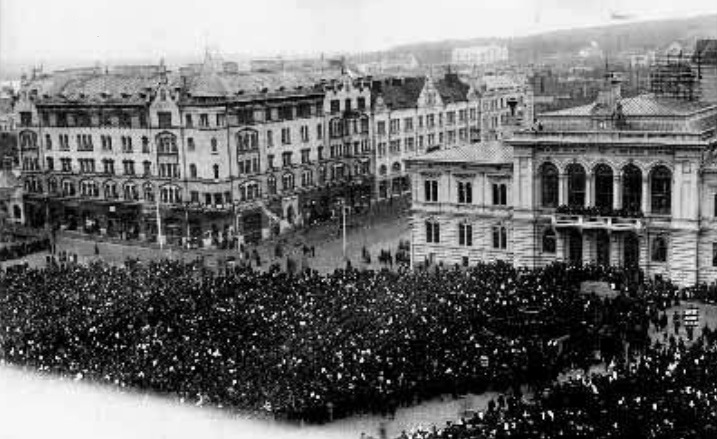
The 1905 general strike in Tampere, Grand Duchy of Finland

Some of the general strikes of this period reached revolutionary levels: the Russian Revolution of 1905 demonstrated the efficacy of the general strike as a revolutionary instrument, but was ultimately suppressed; in 1909, the Catalan syndicalist union Solidaridad Obrera called a general strike against conscription for the Spanish invasion of Morocco, briefly bringing Barcelona under workers' control before the revolt's suppression by government forces; and following the Revolution of 1910 in Portugal, a syndicalist-led general strike briefly brought Lisbon under workers' control before being repressed, resulting in the formation of the National Workers' Union by Portuguese socialists and anarchists.

In Italy, there was a particularly large wave of general strikes during this period: the general strike of 1904 resulted in no political reforms but strengthened the social movement; in 1908, syndicalists led a two-month general strike in Parma, but were likewise defeated; and in 1911, anarcho-syndicalists mobilised a general strike against the Italian invasion of Libya, blocking troop trains and even assassinating an army officer. This series of syndicalist-led general strikes brought about the establishment of the Italian Syndicalist Union (USI), which itself led a further series of general strikes that culminated in the Red Week of 1914.

=== Debate in the Second International ===
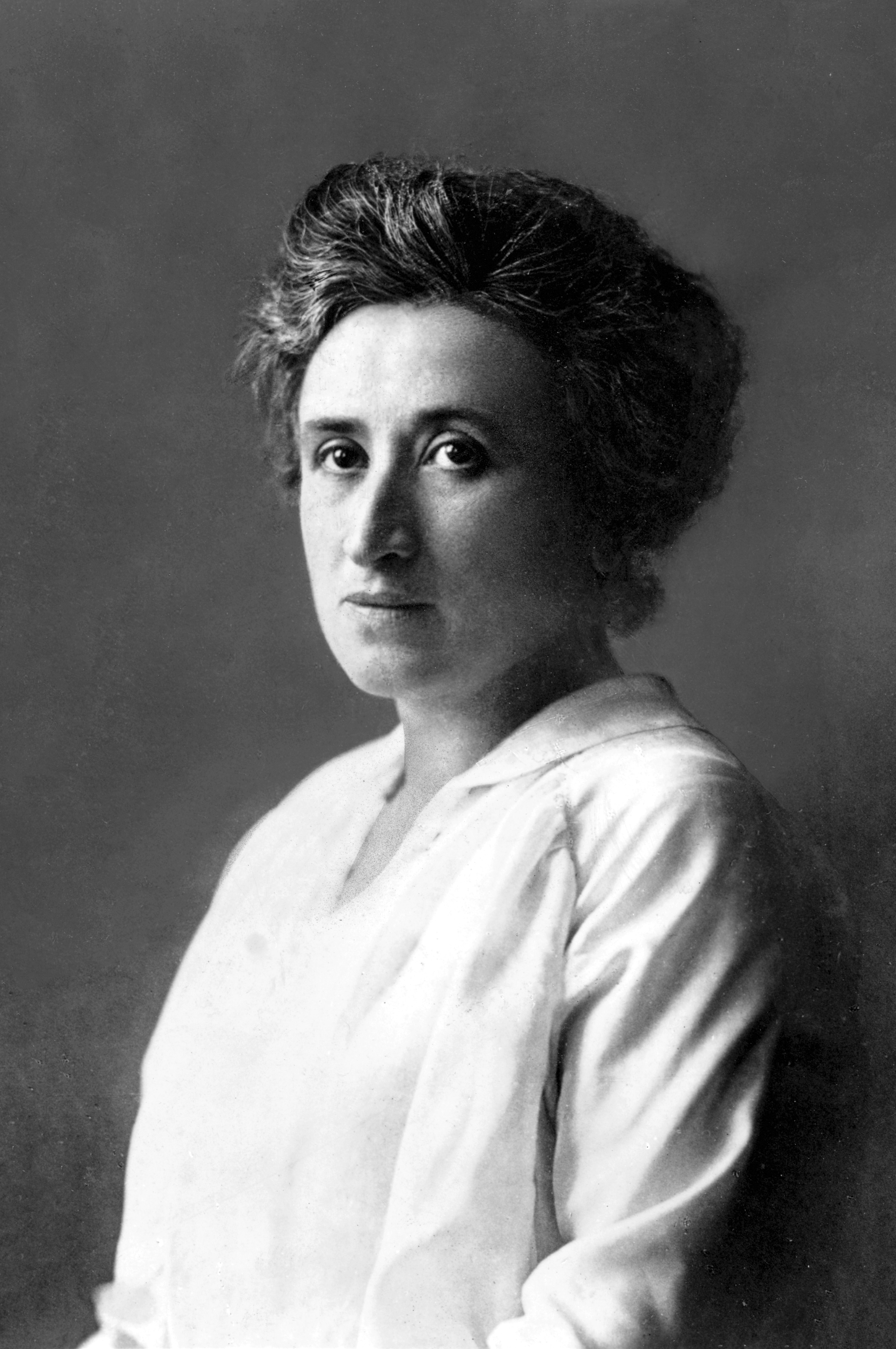
Rosa Luxemburg, a Polish socialist who argued in support of the political general strike in the Labour and Socialist International

In 1889, the Labour and Socialist International was established by classical Marxists and social democrats, such as those of the Social Democratic Party of Germany (SPD). At the Brussels Congress of 1891, it became clear that the International was already divided over two main tactical issues: electoral politics, which the socialists embraced, but anarchists generally opposed; and, the general strike as a mechanism to prevent war, which anarchists supported, but socialists refused to endorse. As a result, at the Zürich Congress of 1893, anarchists were ejected from the International and banned from attending future congresses. Anarchist trade union delegates from the French CGT and Dutch NAS attempted to continue participation, but after being physically attacked while trying to join the London Congress of 1896, the anarchists finally abandoned the International.

Nevertheless, the anarchist defence of the general strike left a lasting legacy within the International. At the Paris Congress of 1900, the French socialist politician Aristide Briand adopted the idea of the revolutionary general strike in order to boost his popularity with the syndicalists. At the Amsterdam Congress of 1904, another French socialist politician defended the general strike as a means to convince socialist voters that they were not merely supporting career politicians. At the Stuttgart Congress of 1907, the anarchist calls for a general strike to prevent war were taken up by Gustave Hervé, but these were ardently opposed by the German delegates, who feared repression by the authorities. Finally, at the Copenhagen Congress of 1910, a proposal for a general strike to prevent war was put forward by the French socialist Édouard Vaillant and the Scottish labour leader Keir Hardie, but this too was voted down by the other delegates. While it was consistently defeated by the social democrats, the anarchist proposal for a general strike was taken up by members of the far-left, such as Karl Liebknecht and Rosa Luxemburg, who saw it as an instrument for obtaining political concessions.

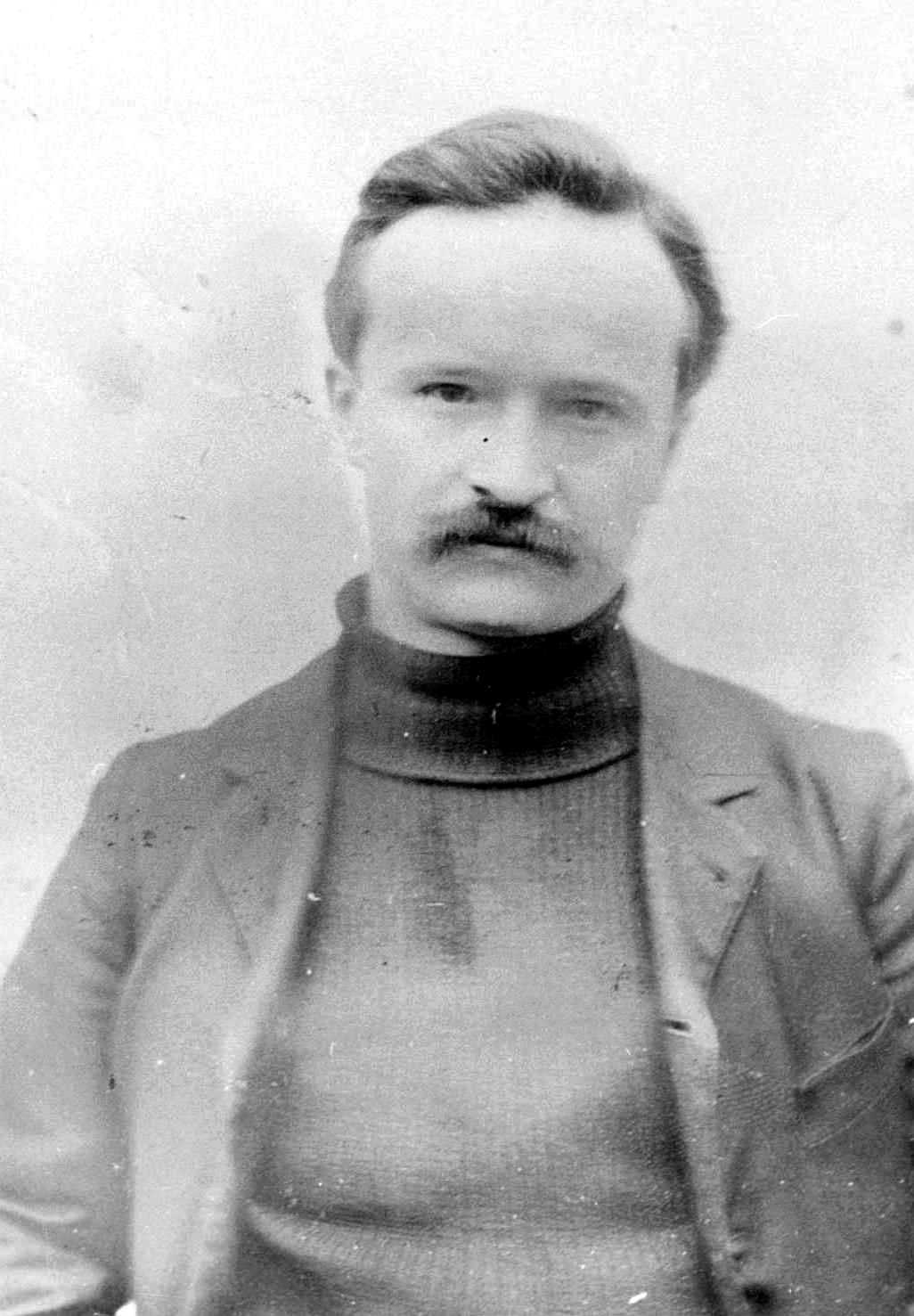
Pierre Monatte, a French syndicalist who argued in support of the revolutionary general strike at the International Anarchist Congress of Amsterdam

Having been completely frozen out of the International, the anarchists resolved to hold their own International Anarchist Congress, which met in Amsterdam in 1907. The Congress played host to a fierce debate between Errico Malatesta, a proponent of classical anarcho-communism, and Pierre Monatte, a disciple of the new current of anarcho-syndicalism. The latter upheld the central role of the trade union in organising a revolutionary general strike to overthrow capitalism, after which the unions would form the basis for the construction of a new stateless society with a socialist economy. But the advancement of syndicalism was blocked chiefly by Malatesta, who objected to the class reductionism of the syndicalists. Malatesta was particularly critical of the general strike, which he dismissed as a "magic weapon" that was incapable of fighting a violent conflict with state militaries, which had the ability to starve out workers in the event of such an industrial dispute. Although the anarcho-syndicalists had seen the Amsterdam Congress as a means to establish an international anarchist organisation, efforts in this direction were sabotaged by the conflict between the two factions.

Despite all the calls for a general strike to prevent war, by the outbreak of World War I, many socialists dropped their anti-militarism and instead threw their support behind the Allied war effort. The Second International itself collapsed, leaving only anarcho-syndicalists and Bolsheviks to rally an anti-war opposition.

=== 20th century ===
The 1926 United Kingdom general strike started in the coal industry and rapidly escalated; the unions called out 1,750,000 workers, mainly in the transport and steel sectors, although the strike was successfully suppressed by the government.

The year 1919 saw a number of general strikes throughout the United States and Canada, including two that were considered significant—the Seattle General Strike, and the Winnipeg General Strike. While the IWW participated in the Seattle General Strike, that action was called by the Seattle Central Labor Union, affiliated with the American Federation of Labor (AFL, predecessor of the AFL–CIO).

In June 1919, the AFL national organisation, in session in Atlantic City, New Jersey, passed resolutions in opposition to the general strike. The official report of these proceedings described the convention as the "largest and in all probability the most important Convention ever held" by the organisation, in part for having engineered the "overwhelming defeat of the so-called Radical element" via crushing a "One Big Union proposition", and also for defeating a proposal for a nationwide general strike, both "by a vote of more than 20 to 1". The AFL amended its constitution to disallow any central labour union (i.e., regional labour councils) from "taking a strike vote without prior authorization of the national officers of the union concerned". The change was intended to "check the spread of general strike sentiment and prevent recurrences of what happened at Seattle and is now going on at Winnipeg". The penalty for any unauthorised strike vote was revocation of that body's charter.

As part of the fight for the Indian independence movement, leader Mahatma Gandhi promoted the use of what is called Hartal, a mass protest and a form of civil disobedience that often involved a total shutdown of workplaces, offices, shops, and courts of law.

==== Legality ====
In the U.S., its legislature passed the anti-union Taft–Hartley Act in the wake of the women-led 1946 Oakland General Strike. It outlawed actions taken by unionized workers in support of workers at other companies, effectively rendering both solidarity actions and the general strike itself illegal.

== Forms ==
Two of the main forms of general strike are: the political strike, which aims to achieve political and economic reform; and the revolutionary strike, which aims to overthrow capitalism and the state in a social revolution. Other forms, identified by Gerhart Niemeyer, include: the general strike as a "revolutionary exercise" which would eventually lead to a transformation of society; a one-day demonstration on International Workers' Day, aimed at identifying a "worldwide proletariat"; and a theoretical mechanism by which to stop wars between nation states.

Industrial unionists such as Ralph Chaplin and Stephen Naft also identified four different levels of general strike, rising from a localised strike, to an industry-wide strike, to a nationwide strike, and finally to a revolutionary strike.

== Debates on general strikes ==
=== Socialists versus anarchists ===
In his study of the debates within the Second International, Niemeyer perceived the socialist-friendly general strike for political rights within the system and the general strike as a revolutionary mechanism to overthrow the existing order—which he associated with a "rising anarcho-syndicalist movement"—as mutually exclusive. Niemeyer believed that the difficulty arose from the fact that the general strike was "one instrument", but was frequently considered "without distinction of underlying motives".

=== Syndicalism and general strikes ===
The Industrial Workers of the World (IWW) began to fully embrace the general strike in 1910–1911. The ultimate goal of the general strike, according to Industrial Workers of the World theory, is to displace capitalists and give control over the means of production to workers. In a 1911 speech in New York City, IWW organiser Bill Haywood explained his view of the economic situation, and why he believed a general strike was justified,

The capitalists have wealth; they have money. They invest the money in machinery, in the resources of the earth. They operate a factory, a mine, a railroad, a mill. They will keep that factory running just as long as there are profits coming in. When anything happens to disturb the profits, what do the capitalists do? They go on strike, don't they? They withdraw their finances from that particular mill. They close it down because there are no profits to be made there. They don't care what becomes of the working class. But the working class, on the other hand, has always been taught to take care of the capitalist's interest in the property.

Bill Haywood believed that industrial unionism made possible the general strike, and the general strike made possible industrial democracy. According to Wobbly theory, the conventional strike is an important (but not the only) weapon for improving wages, hours, and working conditions for working people. These strikes are also good training to help workers educate themselves about the class struggle, and about what it will take to execute an eventual general strike for the purpose of achieving industrial democracy. During the final general strike, workers would not walk out of their shops, factories, mines, and mills, but would rather occupy their workplaces and take them over. Prior to taking action to initiate industrial democracy, workers would need to educate themselves with technical and managerial knowledge in order to operate industry.

According to labour historian Philip S. Foner, the Wobbly conception of industrial democracy is intentionally not presented in detail by IWW theorists; in that sense, the details are left to the "future development of society". However, certain concepts are implicit. Industrial democracy will be "a new society [built] within the shell of the old". Members of the industrial union educate themselves to operate industry according to democratic principles, and without the current hierarchical ownership/management structure. Issues such as production and distribution would be managed by the workers themselves.

In 1927 the IWW called for a three-day nationwide walkout to protest the execution of anarchists Ferdinando Nicola Sacco and Bartolomeo Vanzetti. The most notable response to the call was in the Walsenburg coal district of Colorado, where 1,132 miners stayed off the job, and only 35 went to work, a participation rate that led directly to the Colorado coal strike of 1927.

On 18 March 2011, the Industrial Workers of the World supported an endorsement of a general strike as a follow-up to protests against Governor Scott Walker's proposed labour legislation in Wisconsin, following a motion passed by the South Central Federation of Labor (SCFL) of Wisconsin endorsing a statewide general strike as a response to those legislative proposals. The SCFL website states,

At SCFL's monthly meeting Monday, Feb. 21, delegates endorsed the following: "The SCFL endorses a general strike, possibly for the day Walker signs his 'budget repair bill.'" An ad hoc committee was formed to explore the details. SCFL did not CALL for a general strike because it does not have that authority.

== Notable general strikes ==
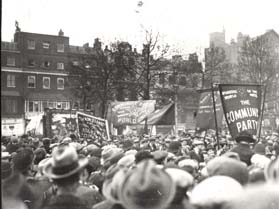
1926 United Kingdom general strike

The largest general strike that ever stopped the economy of an advanced industrial country—and the first general wildcat strike in history—was May 1968 in France. The prolonged strike involved eleven million workers for two weeks in a row, and its impact was such that it almost caused the collapse of the de Gaulle government. Other notable general strikes include:

- In Portugal, a general strike was called in 2011 by the federation of public labour unions to avert austerity measures.
- In Honduras, a general strike was called in 2011 by union workers, farmers and other organisations demanding better education, an increase in the minimum wage and against fuel price hikes.
- In Yemen, thousands of people took to the streets of Taiz in a 2011 general strike to protest President Ali Abdullah Saleh.
- In Algeria, public sector workers in 2011 mounted a general strike for higher wages and improved working conditions.
- In February 1947, General Douglas MacArthur, as Supreme Commander of the Allied Powers in Japan, banned a planned general strike of 2,400,000 government workers, stating that "so deadly a social weapon" as a general strike should not be used in the impoverished and emaciated condition of Japan so soon after World War II. Japan's labour leaders complied with his ban.
- In June 2022, Tunisian workers initiated a general strike that halted all transportation.
- In Czechoslovakia, a 1989 general strike helped topple the communist government.
- In Northern Ireland, a 1974 general strike by Ulster Unionists helped scuttle the Sunningdale Agreement that was intended to bring an end to The Troubles.
- In Minnesota, United States a general strike was organised in January 2026 to protest against Operation Metro Surge, a large federal crackdown led by the Department of Homeland Security, specifically Immigration and Customs Enforcement.

== See also ==
- Civil disobedience
- Civil resistance
- Critique of work
- Demonstration (political)
- Direct action
- Earth Strike
- Georges Sorel
- Hartal
- Industrial Workers of the World
- Industrial unionism
- List of strikes
- Nonviolent resistance
- Occupation of factories
- Protest
- Secessio plebis
- Stay-away
- Syndicalism
- Workers' self-management

== Bibliography ==
- Adams, Matthew S. (2018). "Anarchism and the First International". In Adams, Matthew S.; Levy, Carl (eds.). The Palgrave Handbook of Anarchism. London: Palgrave Macmillan. pp. 389–408. doi:10.1007/978-3-319-75620-2_23. ISBN 978-3319756196. S2CID 158605651.
- Carpenter, Niles (May 1921). "William Benbow and the Origin of the General Strike". The Quarterly Journal of Economics. 35 (3): 491–499. doi:10.2307/1884099. ISSN 0033-5533. JSTOR 1884099. OCLC 5791147291.
- D'Agostino, Anthony (2018). "Anarchism and Marxism in the Russian Revolution". In Adams, Matthew S.; Levy, Carl (eds.). The Palgrave Handbook of Anarchism. London: Palgrave Macmillan. pp. 409–428. doi:10.1007/978-3-319-75620-2_24. ISBN 978-3319756196. S2CID 158605651.
- Damier, Vadim (2009) [2000]. Anarcho-syndicalism in the 20th Century. Translated by Archibald, Malcolm. Edmonton: Black Cat Press. ISBN 978-0-9737827-6-9.
- Dubofsky, Melvyn (2000). We Shall Be All: A History of the Industrial Workers of the World (Abridged ed.). University of Illinois Press. ISBN 0-252-06905-6. LCCN 00-008215.
- Foner, Philip S. (1997) [1965]. History of the Labor Movement in the United States. Vol. 4. International Publishers. ISBN 0-7178-0396-1. LCCN 47-19381.
- Foner, Philip S. (1998) [1947]. History of the Labor Movement in the United States. Vol. 1. International Publishers. ISBN 0-7178-0376-7. LCCN 47-19381.
- Goodstein, Phil H. (1984). The Theory of the General Strike From the French Revolution To Poland. Columbia University Press. ISBN 0-88033-050-3. LCCN 83-83003.
- Graham, Robert (2018). "Anarchism and the First International". In Adams, Matthew S.; Levy, Carl (eds.). The Palgrave Handbook of Anarchism. London: Palgrave Macmillan. pp. 325–342. doi:10.1007/978-3-319-75620-2_19. ISBN 978-3319756196. S2CID 158605651.
- Mather, F. C. (1974). "The General Strike of 1842". In Quinault, R.; Stevenson, J. (eds.). Popular Protest and Public Order. Routledge. pp. 1–26. doi:10.4324/9781003186892-3. ISBN 9781003186892. S2CID 242636272.
- McClurg, Donald J. (1963). "The Colorado Coal Strike of 1927 — Tactical Leadership of the IWW". Labor History. 4 (1): 68–92. doi:10.1080/00236566308583916. ISSN 1469-9702.
- Niemeyer, Gerhart (1966). "The Second International: 1889–1914". In Drachkovitch, Milorad M. (ed.). The Revolutionary Internationals, 1864–1943. Stanford University Press. pp. 95–127. LCCN 66015299.
- Nomad, Max (1966). "The Anarchist Tradition". In Drachkovitch, Milorad M. (ed.). The Revolutionary Internationals, 1864–1943. Stanford University Press. pp. 57–92. LCCN 66015299.
- Prothero, Iorwerth (May 1974). "William Benbow and the Concept of the "General Strike"". Past & Present (63). Oxford University Press: 132–171. doi:10.1093/past/63.1.132. ISSN 0031-2746. JSTOR 650291. OCLC 5549144804.
- Tuñón de Lara, Manuel (1977) [1972]. El movimiento obrero en la historia de España. I.1832-1899 (in Spanish) (2ª ed.). Barcelona: Laia. ISBN 84-7222-331-0.
- Slobodin, Henry (December 1916). "The General Strike". International Socialist Review. 17 (6): 353–355.
- Spivak, Gayatri Chakravorty (2014). "General strike". Rethinking Marxism. 26 (1): 9–14. doi:10.1080/08935696.2014.857839. ISSN 1475-8059. S2CID 219715518.
- van der Walt, Lucien; Schmidt, Michael (2009). Black Flame: The Revolutionary Class Politics of Anarchism and Syndicalism. Edinburgh: AK Press. ISBN 978-1-904859-16-1. LCCN 2006933558. OCLC 1100238201.
- van der Walt, Lucien (2018). "Syndicalism". In Adams, Matthew S.; Levy, Carl (eds.). The Palgrave Handbook of Anarchism. London: Palgrave Macmillan. pp. 249–264. doi:10.1007/978-3-319-75620-2_14. ISBN 978-3319756196. S2CID 242074567.
- Williams, Dana M. (2018). "Tactics: Conceptions of Social Change, Revolution, and Anarchist Organisation". In Adams, Matthew S.; Levy, Carl (eds.). The Palgrave Handbook of Anarchism. London: Palgrave Macmillan. pp. 107–124. doi:10.1007/978-3-319-75620-2_6. ISBN 978-3319756196. S2CID 158841066.
- Zimmer, Kenyon (2018). "Haymarket and the Rise of Syndicalism". In Adams, Matthew S.; Levy, Carl (eds.). The Palgrave Handbook of Anarchism. London: Palgrave Macmillan. pp. 353–370. doi:10.1007/978-3-319-75620-2_21. ISBN 978-3319756196. S2CID 242074567.
