= General Confederation of Labour (Portugal) =

Portuguese trade union confederation

CGT
- General Confederation of Labour
- Confederação Geral do Trabalho
- CGT logo, with its motto "Bread and Liberty"
- Predecessor: National Workers' Union
- Established: 13 September 1919; 107 years ago
- Dissolved: February 1927; 99 years ago (banned); c. 1938; 88 years ago (defunct)
- Type: National trade union confederation
- Headquarters: Calçada do Combro, 38, Lisbon
- Location: Portugal
- Members: 150,000 (1922)
- General Secretary: Manuel Joaquim de Sousa (1919–1922); José Santos Arranha (1922–1925); Manuel da Silva Campos (1925–1926); Mário Castelhano (1926–1927); Emídio Santana (1927–1937)
- Publication: A Batalha
- Affiliations: International Workers' Association

The General Confederation of Labour (Portuguese: Confederação Geral do Trabalho; CGT) was a Portuguese trade union confederation. Established in 1919, as the successor to the National Workers' Union (UON), the CGT was the only national trade union centre in Portugal throughout the early 1920s. The organisation was led largely by anarcho-syndicalists, who declared the CGT to be independent of all political parties and proclaimed its goal to be the abolition of capitalism and the state. Opposed to Bolshevism, it refused to join the Red International of Labour Unions (RILU) and instead joined the International Workers' Association (IWA), which was aligned with anarcho-syndicalism. An internal schism between the syndicalist leadership and members of the Portuguese Communist Party (PCP) followed, as unions aligned with the latter broke off from the CGT. Following the establishment of a military dictatorship in Portugal, the CGT led a workers' uprising against it, but they were defeated, the organisation banned and many of their members exiled to Africa. After the establishment of the fascist Estado Novo regime, the CGT attempted to resist the creation of a corporatist economy and led a general strike against it, but this too was suppressed. The CGT's general secretary then attempted to assassinate the dictator António de Oliveira Salazar, but was unsuccessful. The CGT was ultimately driven underground and eventually disappeared, as the fascist regime was consolidated in Portugal.

== History ==
=== Background ===
During the late 19th century, trade unions in Portugal were largely dominated by the Portuguese Socialist Party (PSP); Portuguese anarchists held a comparatively minor amount of influence. In the 1890s, anarchists began to gain influence over trade union movement. As strikes and direct actions increased in frequency, more unions aligned with anarchism and revolutionary syndicalism. This process culminated in the late 1900s, with the establishment of regional labour federations in Lisbon and Porto, which aimed to establish workers' control over the economy. By the proclamation of the First Portuguese Republic in 1910, syndicalists had displaced the socialists as the dominant force within the Portuguese labour movement. A wave of strikes followed, with one general strike briefly establishing workers' control over Lisbon. After the government responded by increasing repression against the labour movement, in 1914, socialists and syndicalists came together in a coalition and established the National Workers' Union (UON). The outbreak of World War I caused widespread unrest in Portugal, as workers protested, rioted and went on strike. By 1917, anarcho-syndicalists had gained control of the UON.

=== Establishment ===
Following the end of the war and the subsequent defeat of the UON's general strike in November 1918, the labour movement felt the need to reorganise itself for the purposes of taking power. Despite the setback, the Portuguese working class continued organising, as they faced increasing unemployment and a continually rising cost of living, which pushed workers to fight for the eight-hour day. In September 1919, a second national workers' congress was held in Coimbra, where the UON was reorganised into the General Confederation of Labour (Portuguese: Confederação Geral do Trabalho; CGT). The CGT was established to coordinate Portugal's various trade unions, local confederations and national federations, each of which was given a free vote on whether to join the CGT. At the time of its founding, the CGT was the only national trade union confederation in the country.

=== International links ===
In December 1920, the CGT declared its support for an international syndicalist conference, which had been convened in Berlin to discuss whether revolutionary unions would affiliate themselves with the newly established Red International of Labour Unions (RILU). The CGT ultimately decided not to join the RILU. In June 1922, the CGT was invited to another international syndicalist conference in Berlin, where the establishment of an independent revolutionary trade union international was to be discussed. But CGT delegates were unable to attend, as they were facing domestic problems. The Argentine delegate Diego Abad de Santillán, speaking on behalf of the CGT, declared their support for a new international.

After the delegates of the Berlin conference endorsed the establishment of a new international, in October 1922, the CGT convened a national congress to discuss the issue, with 55 local unions supporting the proposal and 22 favouring affiliating with the RILU. The CGT thus endorsed the constitutional congress of the International Workers' Association (IWA), which took place in Berlin in December 1922. In October 1924, out of 110 unions affiliated with the CGT, 104 supported affiliation with the IWA and only 6 supported the RILU.

=== Restructuring and internal conflict ===
Although Portuguese workers remained staunchly militant throughout the early 1920s, the CGT's membership experienced a decline. Some members of the CGT attributed the organisation's falling membership numbers to internal political conflicts, which caused workers to leave the organisation and only rejoin when workplace conflicts broke out. Historians Bernhard H. Bayerlein and Marcel van der Linden attributed the declining membership to the fact that the CGT largely organised skilled workers and artisans, while neglecting lower-class labourers. They noted four key factors that affected the CGT during the early 1920s: their membership was largely concentrated in the large industrial cities of Lisbon, Porto and Covilhã; their actions were spontaneous and short-lived, often dispersing without achieving long-term improvements; a hierarchy emerged between skilled and unskilled workers; and state repression increased, while business owners concentrated into employers' organisations.

Facing a sustained decline in its membership numbers, in 1922, the CGT held a third national workers congress in Covilha, where it made the decision to restructure itself. From that point on, the CGT opened its membership to artists' and students' unions, as well as tenants unions, consumers' co-operatives and solidarity groups. The CGT continued to lead strike actions over the following years, and in February 1925, it organised the largest political demonstration in the history of Portugal, with over 100,000 workers participating.

By this time, the CGT was facing an internal schism between syndicalists and communists. The nascent Portuguese Communist Party (PCP), which had been established by a coalition of anarchists, syndicalists and left-wing socialists, initially called on its members to organise within the CGT. The syndicalist leadership of the CGT attempted to block any public debates with the communists, and in 1925, party members were prohibited from attending the CGT's congress at Santarém. Communist-aligned unions, including the sailors' and dockers' federation and some agricultural workers' unions, began splitting off, with the PCP establishing its own trade union centre in 1926.

=== Repression ===
By the mid-1920s, the labour movement had been substantially weakened, while the middle classes were becoming frustrated with the republican government and the Portuguese Army was gaining power. Portuguese syndicalism was soon faced with the rise of fascism. Following the 28 May 1926 coup d'état and subsequent establishment of a military dictatorship, Portuguese trade unions fell under political repression. The CGT attempted to resist, calling a general strike against the dictatorship in February 1927, but this was violently repressed, with the military killing 100 trade unionists and banning the CGT. The CGT's newspaper A Batalha was soon shut down; its sailors', dockworkers' and construction workers' unions were forcibly dissolved; and 600 of its members were exiled to the colonies of the Portuguese Empire.

With many of its autonomous unions going underground, the CGT attempted to reorganise itself as an illegal organisation, holding secret meetings and covertly distributing its publications. By 1928, the dictatorship had intensified repression against the union, sending informants to infiltrate its ranks and raiding offices suspected of housing CGT unions. Despite the repression, the CGT managed to maintain its structures, including union federations representing seven different industries. By 1930, the CGT counted up to 20,000 members, organised into 32 unions; its construction workers' union even won an appeal to resume legal activities.

In 1933, António de Oliveira Salazar reorganised the dictatorship into the fascist Estado Novo regime. Salazar aimed to create a corporatist economy, with state-controlled unions, and ordered the remaining independent unions to "incorporate" themselves. The CGT refused to comply and, on 18 January 1934, called a general strike to resist the new regime, but it failed. As the CGT faced further repression, general secretary Emídio Santana tried one last action to resist the regime: an attempt to assassinate Salazar. After the bomb missed its target, the regime consolidated its total repression of the trade unions and the incorporation went ahead. The victory of the Nationalists in the Spanish Civil War put a final end to independent trade unionism in Iberia. Spanish and Portuguese anarcho-syndicalists attempted to continue organising clandestinely, but Salazar's dictatorship limited the CGT's scope of action, causing it to wither away. Nevertheless, underground syndicalist unions continued organising and distributing their publications until the 1960s.

Material on the CGT has been collected by the International Institute of Social History, the National Library of Portugal and the University of Lisbon; no centralised archive of the CGT's documents was ever established.

== Organisation ==
The CGT was governed internally by its national congresses, during which delegates decided on the organisation's policy and strategy. Each congress elected seven delegates to a Confederal Committee, which functioned as the organisation's executive organ between congresses. Anarcho-syndicalists were usually in the majority on these committees. The CGT's confederal structure, which it called a "federation of federations", was inherited from its predecessor, the UON. From the outset, the CGT coordinated trade unions, local confederations and national federations; and from 1922, they also organised artists' and students' unions, as well as tenants unions, consumers' co-operatives and solidarity groups.

The CGT's membership accounted for a substantial portion of Portuguese workers, which by the early 1920s numbered roughly 200,000 industrial workers and 100,000 agricultural workers. According to the CGT's own estimates, at the time of its establishment in 1919, it counted 150,000 members, although the exact figures aren't agreed on. By 1924, the CGT's membership figures had declined to 120,000; in 1925, this fell further to 80,000; and by the time the organisation was banned in 1927, the organisation reported to have had 50,000 members. Reliable figures on the CGT's membership during its period of clandestinity were never provided by the organisation itself, although its administrative accountant Gil Gonçalves estimated it to have still had 15,000 members by the establishment of the Estado Novo in 1933.

== Ideology ==
The CGT sought to unite all Portuguese workers into autonomous, federally-linked unions, themselves established to defend and improve living and working conditions. It declared itself to be independent of all political parties and religious institutions, and proclaimed its ultimate goal to be the overthrow of capitalism and the establishment of workers' control over the means of production.

The trade unions of the CGT rejected individualism and reformism, and considered "pure trade unionism" to be insufficient for improving living and working conditions in Portugal. Some anarcho-syndicalists within the CGT proposed the establishment of a Workers' League for Economic Expropriation (Portuguese: Liga Operária de Expropriaçào Economica) to administer the economy after taking power, a programme which resembled the Portuguese Communist Party's own plan for an Economic Council (Portuguese: Conselho Económico) to redistribute wealth.

Although structurally similar to its predecessor, the UON, the CGT differed from it ideologically, as the CGT sought to marginalise the influence of the Socialist Party in the labour movement.

== Bibliography ==
- Bayerlein, Bernhard; van der Linden, Marcel (1990). "Revolutionary Syndicalism in Portugal". In van der Linden, Marcel; Thorpe, Wayne (eds.). Revolutionary Syndicalism: an International Perspective. Aldershot: Scolar Press. pp. 155–166. ISBN 0-85967-815-6.
- Damier, Vadim (2009) [2000]. Anarcho-syndicalism in the 20th Century. Translated by Archibald, Malcolm. Edmonton: Black Cat Press. ISBN 978-0-9737827-6-9.
- Thorpe, Wayne (1989). The Workers Themselves. Kluwer Academic Publishers. ISBN 0-7923-0276-1. LCCN 89-8205.
- van der Walt, Lucien; Schmidt, Michael (2009). Black Flame: The Revolutionary Class Politics of Anarchism and Syndicalism. Edinburgh: AK Press. ISBN 978-1-904859-16-1. LCCN 2006933558. OCLC 1100238201.
