= Mário Castelhano =

Portuguese trade unionist (1896–1940)

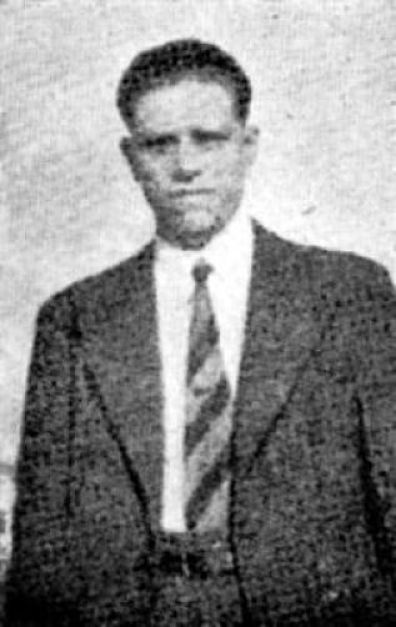
- Born: 1896; Lisbon, Kingdom of Portugal
- Died: 12 October 1940 (aged 43–44); Tarrafal concentration camp, Cape Verde
- Occupation: Journalist
- Employer: Portuguese Railways
- Organization: General Confederation of Labour (CGT)
- Notable work: Quatro Anos de Deportação
- Movement: Anarcho-syndicalism

Mário Castelhano (1896–1940) was a Portuguese anarcho-syndicalist, railway worker and journalist. During the time of the First Portuguese Republic, he began organising strike actions within the General Confederation of Labour (CGT). He edited the organisation's various newspapers, including that of the railway workers' union, during the early 1920s. He was elected general secretary of the CGT after the establishment of the National Dictatorship and was arrested for his part in the February 1927 Revolt, following which the CGT was banned. Exiled, he went on to participate in the Madeira uprising and later clandestinely returned to Portugal, where he organised the Portuguese general strike of 1934. He was again arrested and deported, later dying in Tarrafal concentration camp in Cape Verde. His memoirs about his exile in Angola, in which he clearly expressed his views on anti-colonialism and anti-racism, were published posthumously in 1975.

== Biography ==
Mário Castelhano was born into a working-class family in Lisbon, in 1896. At the age of 14, he began working for the Portuguese Railways, where he took part in the 1911 strike and was involved in organising the 1918 and 1920 strikes, for which he was dismissed from his job. He then went to work as a bookkeeper for the General Confederation of Labour (CGT), an anarcho-syndicalist trade union, within which he was a member of the railway workers' union. During the 1920s, he was editor-in-chief of the trade union newspapers A Federação Ferroviária and A Batalha, and a contributor to the magazine Renovação. He was also director of the newspapers O Ferroviário and O Rápido. In these newspapers, he wrote extensively about the revolutionary potential of workers in the transportation industry.

After the 28 May 1926 coup d'état, which overthrew the First Portuguese Republic and established the National Dictatorship, he was elected as general secretary of the CGT and oversaw the reorganisation of its structure. Following the repression of the February 1927 Revolt, the CGT was outlawed and the offices of A Batalha were raided. Its last issue was published on 26 May 1927. Castelhano was arrested in October 1927 and deported to the following month to Angola, where he was imprisoned for nearly three years. He was sent to the coastal city of Novo Redondo, then to inland towns such as Amboiva, Conda and Seles, where he worked as a clerk for a plantation. In September 1930, he was transferred to Pico Island in the Azores. He was then transferred to Cape Verde, but managed to escape to Madeira. In April 1931, Castelhano participated in the Madeira uprising, which was also suppressed. He fled the island as a stowaway on board a ship, returning to Lisbon.

Upon his return from exile, he wrote his memoirs about his years in exile. Half of the book was dedicated to analysing the material conditions of the Angolan people, and the consequences of Portuguese colonialism in the African country. He was fiercely critical of the Portuguese Empire's claims to be carrying out a "civilizing mission" in Africa, which he described as having been a deceitful justification for exploitation and dehumanisation. Arguing that the so-called "backwardness" of African society had actually been caused by colonialism, Castelhano rejected the theses of scientific racism, which claimed that the "inferior" status of African people to Europeans was a result of biological determinism. He declared that it was his desire to "undermine" all forms of oppression, including racism; he therefore advocated for racial equality, calling for Portuguese workers to extend solidarity to African workers and establish a "class-based unity" across racial lines. He called for colonialism to be abolished, and instead for food and education to be provided to African workers.

By 1933, he had once again been elected as the general secretary of the CGT, with which he began planning the Portuguese general strike of 1934. He was arrested three days before the strike and sentenced to 16 years in exile. In September 1934, he was deported to the Fortress of São João Baptista on Terceira Island. Two years later, in October 1936, he was sent to the Tarrafal concentration camp in Cape Verde, where he died on 12 October 1940. In 1975, his book Quatro Anos de Deportação (Four Years of Deportation) was posthumously published in Lisbon by Seara Nova. He was posthumously awarded with the rank of Grand Officer of the Order of Liberty, on 30 June 1980. An excerpt of his memoirs was published in English, in 2017, as part of the Lusophone Anarchist Reader.

== Selected works ==
- Quatro Anos de Deportação (1975) [1931]

== Bibliography ==
- Almeida, Fernando J. (1996). "No Centenário do Seu Nascimento: Mário Castelhano e o Movimento Sindical Português". História (in Portuguese). XVIII (25): 22–27.
- Cleminson, Richard (2019). "Anarchism and anticolonialism in Portugal (1919–1926): Mário Domingues, A Batalha and black internationalism" (PDF). Journal of Iberian and Latin American Studies. 25 (3): 441–465. doi:10.1080/14701847.2019.1687199.
- Cleminson, Richard; Duarte, Diogo (2023). "Anarchism, colonialism and the question of "race" in Portugal (c.1890-1930)". Journal of Iberian and Latin American Studies. 29 (1): 115–135. doi:10.1080/14701847.2023.2178169.
- de Góes, Plínio, ed. (2017). The Luso-Anarchist Reader: The Origins of Anarchism in Portugal and Brazil. Information Age Publishing. ISBN 9781681237206.
- Guimarães, Paulo Eduardo; Freire, João Paulo (2010). "Syndicalism and Anarchism in Portugal, during the Interwar Period: Struggles, Ideological Competition, and Repression". Anarchist Elites. II. Ghent: European Social History Conference.
- Loff, Manuel; Ferreira, Sofia (2010). "Castelhano, Mário". Exposição: Resistência. Da alternativa republicana à luta contra a ditadura (1891–1974) (in Portuguese). Comissão Nacional para as Comemorações do Centenário da República. Archived from the original on 24 June 2020.
- Mangorrinha, Jorge (1 March 2016). "Renovação: revista quinzenal de artes, litertura e atualidades (1925–1926)" (PDF). Hemeroteca Municipal de Lisboa (in Portuguese).
- van der Walt, Lucien (2022). "Anarchism and Syndicalism in Southern Africa". In van der Linden, Marcel (ed.). The Cambridge History of Socialism. Vol. 1. Cambridge University Press. pp. 553–576. doi:10.1017/9781108611022.024. ISBN 9781108611022.
