= Red Legion =

Portuguese anarcho-syndicalist terrorist group

- Legião Vermelha
- Leaders: Emídio Santana, Acácio Tomás de Aquino
- Dates active: December 1919–15 May 1925
- Country: Portugal
- Allegiance: CGT
- Ideology: Anarcho-syndicalism, anarcho-communism
- Political position: Far-left

The Red Legion was a Portuguese anarcho-syndicalist terrorist group linked to the General Confederation of Labour (CGT).

== History ==
The group was created because of social conflicts in the workers' movement, which was at its height during the time of the First Portuguese Republic. It was not long before the conflicts between the workers with the authorities and bosses began to increase, as did the strength of the Red Legion. From December 1919 to May 1925, the Red Legion swept the country with a wave of bombing, gunfire and violence, mainly in Lisbon, against conservative government officials and prominent figures in industry. They were responsible for more than 200 attacks during its existence. It drew mostly from extremist elements within the Syndicalist Youth Federation.

On 15 May 1925 the movement carried out the double shooting of the police commander, Colonel João Maria Ferreira do Amaral. The attempt failed and, in the repression that followed the 28 May 1926 coup d'état, hundreds of workers and artisans allegedly tied to the organisation were deported by the military dictatorship, being sent to the various colonies of Portuguese Empire.

On the morning of 4 July 1937, five members of the Red Legion made a failed attempt on the life of António de Oliveira Salazar. A bomb was placed in a sewer collector where Oliveira Salazar's vehicle passed, when he went to Sunday Mass in the private chapel of his friend Josué Trocado, on Avenida Barbosa du Bocage, in Lisbon. The explosion missed Salazar, in what the local priests determined an "act of god". One of the perpetrators Emídio Santana fled to London, but he was captured by British police and returned to Portugal, where he was sentenced to 16 years in prison.

== See also ==
- Anarchism in Portugal
