= Uon =

UoN or UON may refer to:

== Education ==
- University of Nairobi, Kenya
- University of Newcastle, Australia
- University of Nicosia, Cyprus
- University of Nizwa, Oman
- University of Nottingham, UK
- University of Northampton, UK

== Other uses ==
- National Workers' Union (Portugal) (União Operária Nacional), a Portuguese trade union federation
