= National Workers' Union (Portugal) =

Portuguese trade union centre

- União Operária Nacional
- UON logo, with its motto "Bread and Liberty"
- Abbreviation: UON
- Successor: General Confederation of Labour
- Established: 17 March 1914; 112 years ago
- Dissolved: 13 September 1919; 107 years ago
- Type: National trade union centre
- Headquarters: Calçada do Combro, 38, Lisboa
- Location: Portugal
- Members: 60,000 (1914)
- General Secretary: Evaristo Esteves (1917–1919)
- Publication: União Operária (1914–1916); O Movimento Operário (1918–1919); A Batalha (1919)

The National Workers' Union (Portuguese: União Operária Nacional; (Note: Also translated as the National Labour Union.) UON) was a Portuguese trade union federation. Established by a coalition of syndicalists and socialists, in the wake of a strike wave that followed the 1910 revolution, the UON was the first trade union centre to unite workers across different industries from throughout the country. The UON launched a series of strike actions following the Portuguese entry into World War I, which radicalised the union towards anarcho-syndicalism. By 1917, the UON was calling for revolution, backed by its powerful construction workers' union. In November 1918, the UON carried out a national general strike, but it was defeated by the state. The following year, the UON was reorganised into the General Confederation of Labour (CGT), which took over its structures and activities.

== Establishment ==
During the late 19th century, trade unions in Portugal were largely dominated by the Portuguese Socialist Party (PSP), while Portuguese anarchists held a comparatively minor amount of influence. From the 1890s, anarcho-syndicalists steadily gained more influence over the trade unions from the socialists, following the anti-political example of the revolutionary syndicalists in France. By the turn of the 20th century, strike actions and direct actions were increasing in frequency, as more trade unions broke out of reformist control. And as the country industrialised, labor activists began seeking to organise the working class into a single force. In 1909, anarcho-syndicalists in Lisbon held a congress of trade unions and cooperatives, during which they demanded the eight-hour day, established a General Confederation of Labour (CGT) and set themselves the goal of bringing the production of essential goods under workers' control. In 1911, syndicalists in Porto established the General Union of Labour (UGT).

After the monarchy was overthrown in the 5 October 1910 revolution, a massive strike wave broke out, lasting throughout the first year of the Portuguese Republic. The labour movement came to view the Republic as a project of the bourgeoisie, while the Socialist Party failed to win substantial votes in the 1911 election, leading to the further growth of anarchist and syndicalist tendencies. By the second syndicalist congress in May 1911, which was supported by the syndicalist unions in both Lisbon and Porto, syndicalism had become the dominant force in the Portuguese labour movement. In 1912, after 20,000 agricultural workers in Évora went on strike, industrial workers in Lisbon declared a general strike in solidarity with them. An armed workers' uprising in the capital resulted in the city falling under workers' control, but it was ultimately suppressed. In the political repression that followed, socialists and syndicalists sought to repair ties and agreed to hold the first national workers' congress.

In March 1914, the first national workers' congress was held in Tomar. Attending delegates represented 103 trade unions, four regional federations and the national federations of metal and agricultural workers, which altogether accounted for 60,000 workers. Although in the majority, the revolutionary syndicalist delegates offered concessions towards the moderates, in the interest of uniting the trade union movement. Most of the motions at the congress referred to the new Republic's social legislation. Together, the anarcho-syndicalist and socialist delegates established the National Workers' Union (Portuguese: União Operária Nacional; UON). United under the UON were socialist trade unions, including that of the tin welders in the canning industry, as well as radicals in the cork workers', railway workers', barbers' and shoe cleaners' unions. Compared with other national trade union federations of the time, the UON had emerged relatively late and lacked a clear political programme to address the conditions of the Portuguese working class.

== Strike actions ==
Due to its internal dissonance, the UON initially struggled to accomplish its tasks, with its newspaper União Operária only publishing two issues. Following the outbreak of World War I, as living conditions in Portugal deteriorated, workers began to resist the increasing cost of living and rising unemployment, often through spontaneous direct actions. In September 1914, workers were killed during unrest in Lisbon. In the spring of 1915, unemployed workers occupied the Ministry of Agriculture and destroyed the building. Together with the Rural Workers' Association (ATR), the UON organised a series of protests against the rising cost of living throughout the first years of the war. Riots and strikes increased in frequency following the Portuguese entry into the war in 1916. UON member Manuel Joaquim de Sousa also attended an anti-militarist congress in Galicia, where syndicalists from around Europe discussed an international general strike to end the war.

=== Under the Machado government ===
In January 1916, the central council of the UON began to consider proposals to stage a general strike against the rising cost of living. That same month, the union's construction workers organised looting in the Campo de Ourique neighbourhood of Lisbon, culminating in a riot that ended in a shoot-out with the police. In March 1916, the UON was banned by the government of Bernardino Machado, although this only resulted in the further radicalisation of the labour movement. As the price and scarcity of bread increase, food riots likewise increased in frequency and scale, many with the direct involvement of the UON. By 1917, the revolutionary syndicalist faction had gained dominance within the UON, as was reflected at its national convention. In the spring of 1917, several workers' conferences were held in Lisbon and Porto, which brought together 176 trade unions, 4 industrial federations and numerous left-wing newspapers and cooperatives. Among the issues discussed were the organisation of workers, proposals for peace and the cost of living crisis; on the latter, the conferences concluded that government intervention was incapable of solving the crisis.

At the forefront of the UON during this period was its construction workers' federation, which had taken a staunchly anarcho-syndicalist orientation. After a series of riots led by construction workers, the police raided the federation's offices and arrested its members. In May 1917, Machado declared martial law and suspended the constitution in Lisbon, which provoked further protests and riots, leading to shoot-outs with the police and mass arrests. The UON called a general strike in Lisbon, in solidarity with the construction workers. The general strike was successful, managing to secure the return of the offices to the federation, the release of arrested construction workers and a 50% wage increase.

In September 1917, when the government imprisoned striking postal workers and began mobilising them into the military, the UON called another general strike. Armed citizens flooded the streets and newspapers stopped publishing government pronouncements about the mobilisation. The strike soon forced the government to back down and release the workers. The UON subsequently called for a return to work, stating that solidarity shown with postal workers had "exceeded all expectations". Following negotiations with Afonso Costa, the UON brought an end to its campaign against the government, although protests and riots continued. As food and fuel supplies waned further, Machado warned the French diplomat Émile Daeschner that Lisbon was on the brink of collapse.

=== Under the Pais dictatorship ===
By 1918, the UON had been reorganised and reached the peak of its organisational capacity, as the outbreak of the Russian Revolution and the establishment of a dictatorship by Sidónio Pais raised revolutionary sentiments among Portuguese workers. Pais initially sought the support of the trade unions, promising to release syndicalists from prison or exile and implement a corporatist reform package in collaboration with the unions. His corporatist programme won a relatively broad range of support, including from trade unionists and members of the UON, but his coalition would be short lived. When the price of food rose, Pais requisitioned foodstuffs from private warehouses and established state ownership over food distribution. Júlio Botelho Moniz attempted to secure the UON's support for this measure by proposing that the unions take over the sale of food, but the workers refused to form such a pact with the dictatorship. When Pais later refused to implement his promised reform programme, in May 1918, the UON held a series of political demonstrations demanding that the reforms be put in place. The UON was subsequently banned from holding meetings by Pais, who ordered the exile of its president to the African colonies. In response, the UON declared that:

The situation of the workers is unbearable and demands immediate measures [...] The workers therefore demand the right to take part in consumption. [...] It is not reforms which are important, but revolutions. [...] However, as long as the necessary revolution does not take place, the workers have only one way of ensuring their existence: the permanent struggle for higher wages.

In May 1918, the UON began planning for a nationwide general strike with the goal of opposing the rising cost of living. The construction workers' federation went further and called for a revolution. When the revolutionary general strike began on 18 November 1918, the end of the war one week earlier had already calmed many people's revolutionary sentiments and the government had pre-emptively arrested the UON's executive committee. Large amounts of southern Portugal were brought to a standstill, while in Lisbon, the strike was supported by printers, furniture makers and construction workers. The strike was also joined by agricultural workers in Alentejo, who attacked farmhouses and clashes with police. But workers in northern Portugal failed to join the strike, and by 22 November, it was over. One month after the failure of the strike, Sidónio Pais was assassinated, bringing an end to the dictatorship.

=== Post-war activities ===
Despite the defeat, trade unions continued to take action into 1919, as unemployment and the cost of living continued to rise even after the end of the war. That year, trade unions managed to secure the eight-hour day in several sectors of the Portuguese economy. On 23 February 1919, the UON published the first issue of its periodical A Batalha, which grew in readership to achieve the third largest circulation of a Portuguese newspaper. The paper included articles about the trade union movement and workplace issues, as well as subjects like naturism and anti-colonialism. Through A Batalha, the UON publicised the situation of its members that had been deported to the African colonies after the general strike and successfully campaigned for their return.

== Reformation ==
At the second national workers' congress, held in Coimbra in September 1919, the UON was reorganised into the General Confederation of Labour (CGT), a new national trade union confederation. The CGT was dominated by anarcho-syndicalists, who saw the organisation as the nucleus for the administration of a future socialist society. The confederal structure of the CGT was more or less the same as that of the UON, although the CGT differed ideologically from the UON, as it sought to completely marginalise the PSP from the labour movement. The CGT also took over publication of A Batalha, which it modernised and expanded its scope of article inclusion.

== Bibliography ==
- Bayerlein, Bernhard; van der Linden, Marcel (1990). "Revolutionary Syndicalism in Portugal". In van der Linden, Marcel; Thorpe, Wayne (eds.). Revolutionary Syndicalism: an International Perspective. Aldershot: Scolar Press. pp. 155–166. ISBN 0-85967-815-6.
- Chilcote, Ronald H. (2010). The Portuguese Revolution: State and Class in the Transition to Democracy. Rowman & Littlefield. ISBN 9780742567931.
- Cleminson, Richard (2019). "Anarchism and anticolonialism in Portugal (1919-1926): Mário Domingues, A Batalha and black internationalism" (PDF). Journal of Iberian and Latin American Studies. 25 (3): 441–465. doi:10.1080/14701847.2019.1687199.
- Cleminson, Richard (2024). "The Politics of Health in the Lusophone Libertarian Movement: Portugal and Mozambique, 1910–1935". International Labor and Working-Class History. 105: 193–212. doi:10.1017/S0147547923000297.
- Damier, Vadim (2009) [2000]. Anarcho-syndicalism in the 20th Century. Translated by Archibald, Malcolm. Edmonton: Black Cat Press. ISBN 978-0-9737827-6-9.
- Gil Ferreira, Hugo; Marshall, Michael W. (1986). Portugal's Revolution: Ten Years On. Cambridge University Press. ISBN 9780521154857.
- Guimarães, Paulo E.; Freire, João (2010). "Syndicalism and Anarchism in Portugal, during the Interwar Period: Struggles, Dreams and Ideological Debates". Anarchist Elites II: Case Studies. European Social History Conference.
- Lopes, António (2016). "War Abroad and War Within: a British Military Officer's View of Portugal's Revolution of 1917". Revista de Estudos Anglo-Portugueses (25): 307–327. ISSN 0871-682X.
- Pereira, Joana Dias (2021). "Manufacturing Consent and Dissent: Protagonists and Themes of the First Wave of Associative Congresses in Portugal (1865-1934)". Revista Brasileira de História. 41 (88): 331–355. doi:10.1590/1806-93472021v41n88-16. hdl:10362/135567.
- Pereira, Joana Dias (2022). "An Aspect of Modern Civilisation. The Associative Congresses in Portugal (1865-1926)". Análise Social. 57 (245): 676–703. doi:10.31447/AS00032573.2022245.03. JSTOR 27189350.
- Pires, A.P.; Mascarenhas-Mateus, J. (2021). "Towards a social history of the Portuguese construction industry (1914–1918)". History of Construction Cultures. Vol. 2. CRC Press. pp. 514–521. doi:10.1201/9781003173434-179. ISBN 9781003173434.
- Redondo Cardeñoso, Jesús-Ángel (2020). "Political Mobilization and Social Unrest in Rural Portugal in the Early Twentieth Century: The Example of Montemor-o-Novo between 1908 and 1918". European History Quarterly. 50 (1): 44–65. doi:10.1177/0265691419890857. hdl:10174/35871.
- Ribeiro de Meneses, Filipe (2014). "Revolutions (Portugal)". In Daniel, Ute; Gatrell, Peter; Janz, Oliver; Jones, Heather; Keene, Jennifer; Kramer, Alan; Nasson, Bill (eds.). 1914-1918-online. International Encyclopedia of the First World War. Freie Universität Berlin.
- Ribeiro de Meneses, Filipe; Aires Oliveira, Pedro (2023). "The Portuguese Republic at War: States of Emergency or Business as Usual?". First World War Studies. 14 (2–3): 273–292. doi:10.1080/19475020.2024.2369521.
- Schwartzman, Kathleen Crowley (1989). The Social Origins of Democratic Collapse: The First Portuguese Republic in the Global Economy. University Press of Kansas. ISBN 0-7006-0410-3.
- van der Walt, Lucien; Schmidt, Michael (2009). Black Flame: The Revolutionary Class Politics of Anarchism and Syndicalism. Edinburgh: AK Press. ISBN 978-1-904859-16-1. LCCN 2006933558. OCLC 1100238201.
- Wätzold, Tim (2014). "Nostra patria é il mondo intero: Libertarian internationalism in the era of mass migration and the development of the South American labour movement (1870–1920)". Moving the Social. 52: 171–197. doi:10.13154/mts.52.2014.171-197.
