= Portuguese general strike of 1934 =

General strike in Portugal on 18 January 1934

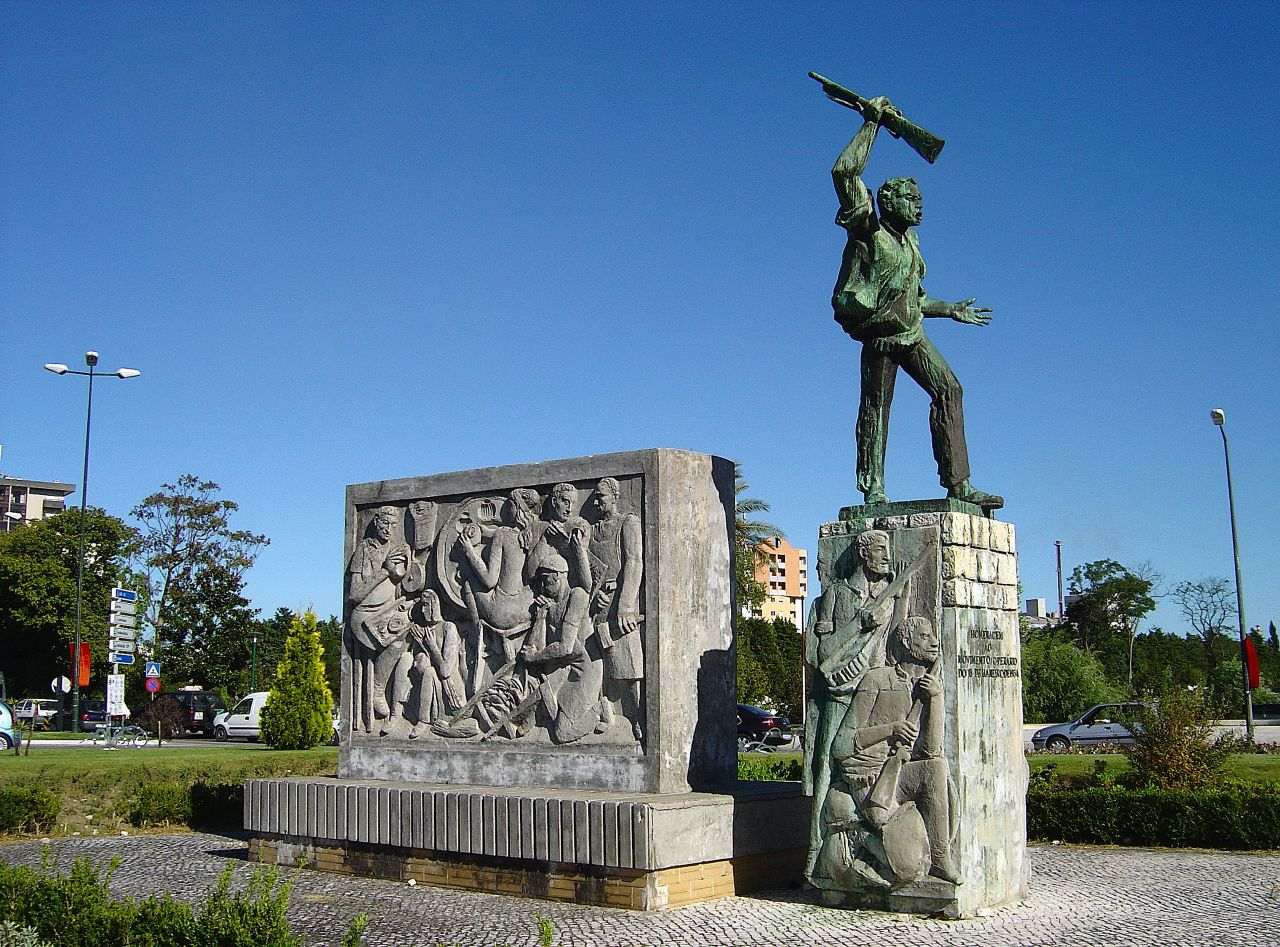
Memorial to the strikers in Marinha Grande

The Portuguese general strike of 1934 took place on 18 January throughout the whole country, although in an ill-coordinated way. Strikes and demonstrations were held in the capital Lisbon and in Porto, Coimbra, Braga, Leiria, Almada, Anadia, Setúbal, Silves, Sines, and many other locations, and these were sometimes accompanied by sabotage. Activities were most dramatic in the glass-making town of Marinha Grande, which is why the day is sometimes known as the day of the "Marinha Grande revolt".

== Background ==
The general strike was triggered by the publication, in September 1933, of Decree No. 23 050 by the authoritarian Estado Novo government, led by António Salazar, although steps were being taken to plan a strike even before the decree was formally announced. This decree made collective bargaining, trade unions and strikes illegal. By 31 December 1933, all existing unions in the private sector were required to change their statutes to comply with the new law and fit in with the corporatist approach of the Estado Novo, which aimed at achieving harmony between the private sector and its workers. Unions of the government sector were simply abolished. At this time, there were 754 unions, but only 57 accepted the new law. The rest joined in preparations for a national strike under a United Front, made up of the communist Inter-Union Commission (CIS), anarcho-syndicalists of the General Confederation of Labour (CGT), the socialist Federation of Workers' Associations (FAO), and others. Historians have generally concluded that the CGT was the most radical in its approach, calling for armed action, bomb attacks and sabotage, while the communist unions generally limited their support to strikes.

== Events on 18 January 1934 ==
The protests resulted in the proclamation by the government of a "State of Siege", with the closure of businesses and the prohibition of circulation in downtown Lisbon. Although many workers went on strike, the response to the strike was generally patchy. In Coimbra, workers occupied the power station and left the city in the dark, and in Braga and Póvoa de Santa Iria there were train derailments and power cuts. In the Chelas area of Lisbon, the police station was occupied, and the gunpowder factory broken into. There was a bomb explosion in the Poço do Bispo area of the capital and a railway line in the port area was cut. In Barreiro, Silves, Seixal, Almada, Alfeite, near the Lisbon Naval Base, Cacilhas, Setúbal and other locations there were demonstrations by strikers, which were often controlled by the police by charging the demonstrators on horseback.

== Reasons for lack of impact ==
The causes of the failure of the strike to have more impact remain the subject of debate. Some CGT supporters accused the Portuguese Communist Party (PCP) of a plot to alert the political police, causing some CGT strike leaders to be arrested on the eve of the strike. It is suggested that the then leader of the PCP, Bento António Gonçalves, did all he could to stop the strike going ahead. The lack of complete agreement between the CIS and the CGT was a contributory factor to the lack of impact of the strike. It seems clear, however, that no strike would have had the strength to overthrow all the forces that the government could marshal. The locations where the strikers were most active were, in most cases, soon controlled by the police, army and the Guarda Nacional Republicana (GNR), Portugal's military police force, or Gendarmerie. The police and the government seemed to be aware of the preparations for the strike and the date it was to be held. Some of the main union leaders, including Mário Castelhano, leader of the CGT, Acácio Tomás de Aquino and Carlos Vilhena were detained before the strike. Overnight, between the 17th and 18th, Salazar left his residence and important sites in the capital were occupied by the army. With word of these preparations by the government spreading, support for the strike ended up being reduced.

== Aftermath ==
The immediate aftermath included a loosening of censorship, with newspapers being encouraged to report on the violent events of the 18th, thus creating a climate in which the government could maximise the subsequent repression. Efforts were made by the government to place most of the blame for the strike on the unions supported by the Portuguese Communist Party. Recriminations between the various factions involved developed over time. In effect, the CGT and CIS each sought to take credit for successes and blame the other for failures.

Workers' movements were dismantled by the Surveillance and State Defense Police (PVDE). On 19 January, Salazar proposed to the Council of Ministers several repressive measures. Considered as participants in a "revolutionary act", both leaders and supporters of the strike were subjected to special courts. The events of 18 January also resulted in the government's decision to create penal camps in its colonies. Numerous arrests were made. Some of those arrested were sent to the Portuguese Autonomous Regions of the Azores and Madeira while others were shipped to a prison camp on the north bank of the Cunene River in the south of Portuguese Angola, later being transferred to the notorious Tarrafal camp in Cape Verde. In addition to these, two forts in Portugal, at Peniche and Caxias were also converted into political prisons.

The strike also provided the Estado Novo with the opportunity to introduce further repression. It created the Portuguese Legion in 1936, which was a paramilitary organization reporting to the Ministry of Interior with the task of "defending the national heritage and combatting the communist threat and anarchism". After the relaxation of censorship to encourage reporting of violent events, censorship of the press was redoubled and extended to include radio, cinema, theatres and books.

== Events in Marinha Grande ==
Marinha Grande is a town close to the sea, approximately half-way between Portugal's two leading cities of Lisbon and Porto. It has for a long time been a major centre for glass manufacture. Struggles by the glass workers prior to 1934 had created a favourable environment for union action, and only in Marinha Grande was there a serious insurrection on 18 January 1934 that went beyond a simple strike. Initially, early on the morning of 18 January, telephone and telegraph lines with nearby Leiria were cut. Roads were also blocked. The home of a glass factory owner, Emílio Galo, was bombed, as was the power station. At 05.00, armed strikers surrounded the GNR barracks, whose occupants surrendered, as well as taking the City Hall building and the post office. The strikers then apparently proclaimed the "Soviet of Marinha Grande", although this is disputed by some sources.

The revolt did not last long as troops sent from Leiria, consisting of an artillery regiment and an infantry regiment, took control of the town a few hours later, giving no possibility for the strikers to resist. Many dispersed in small groups into the nearby pine forest, while others went to their houses. A few managed to escape to Spain or went underground, although most of the latter appear to have eventually surrendered to the police. The military required the factories to open on 19 January and to provide lists of workers who were not at work on that day, enabling them to identify the strikers who were still on the run.

More than 100 rebels were arrested, with 45 being convicted and given prison sentences and heavy fines. Many of the Marinha Grande strikers were initially sent to Cunene in Angola and, subsequently, to the Tarrafal camp in Cape Verde when it opened in October 1936. Of the 32 prisoners who died in Tarrafal, two were from Marinha Grande, Augusto Costa and António Guerra, and the CGT leader Mário Castelhano also died there. One other striker from Marinha Grande died in the Azores and one in Leiria hospital.

== Events in Almada ==
Almada is situated on the left bank of the River Tagus, due south of Lisbon. In this municipality, particularly in Cova da Piedade, many of the bombs used during the strike were manufactured. The first action on 18 January was the cutting of phone lines and the sabotaging of an underwater telecommunications cable. Many workers did not show up for work. This particularly applied to those working for British-owned cork producing companies, such as Harry Bucknall & Sons, Rankin & Sons and Armstrong & Cork. Other workers in Almada reported for duty at the usual time but then left when groups of strikers visited them. Notable among these were the workers at the Parry & Son shipyards, as well as employees of flour mills located in Cova da Piedade and those working in the canning sector. Construction workers also went on strike, including those working to construct the Lisbon Naval Base, which was being built funded by German reparations after World War I. Effectively, almost the entire working population of Almada supported the strike, including government employees. However, most returned to work on the 19th, with the exception of some cork workers and those employed by mills, who went back on the 20th. Most of the bombs that had been produced in advance went unused.

== Events in Silves ==
In 1934, Silves, in the Algarve region, had about 10,000 inhabitants and was an important centre for the cork industry, producing largely for export. Most of the 23 companies were very small and only one exceeded 100 workers. In total, the industry employed less than one thousand. As in other parts of the country, their allegiance was split between communist and anarcho-syndicalist unions, but both factions agreed to the strike. However, while both sides met separately on the night of 17 January to prepare strike action, communists decided to wait for the signal that the strike was taking place across the country, leaving the CGT union to act alone.

On 18 January the CGT supporters moved to put out of action all telegraph and telephone exchanges, aiming to isolate the town. This was only partially achieved. The late arrival of the train due in Silves at 07.00 convinced the strikers that the railway workers had joined the strike, encouraging them to move on to the next stage, that involved visiting the factories to encourage workers to strike. Some of the leaders were armed with pistols, revolvers and bombs and their efforts were successful, with nearly all workers leaving their posts and joining a demonstration in the centre of the town. This led the GNR to place cavalry and infantry forces on the streets, although without taking any action. However, when the 07.00 train finally arrived the strikers realised that support for the strike in other parts of the country was not as great as they had imagined, and at this point GNR forces attacked them. At the end of the day, the local authorities posted notices requiring the strikers to resume work on the 19th. Employers were instructed to prepare lists of all those who left work on the 18th and those who did not return on the 19th.

On 19 January, the factories opened as usual, but about two hundred workers did not go to work. In the afternoon, many who had turned up in the morning decided to go back on strike. Additional GNR members were brought in from nearby towns, and military forces were also sent to Silves. The strikers did not return to work on the 20th. The 21st was a Sunday and the factories were closed. On the 22nd the workers appeared willing to return but the government had, by then, imposed a law stating that those who had been on strike could not go back to work. Thus, all factories remained closed as all the workers had been on strike. It appears that the government had decided to set an example in Silves, as it applied the new rule more rigorously there than in some other areas, particularly those where work of national importance was being carried out, such as naval dockyards. It would be another three weeks before the government yielded to the pleas of the factory owners and allowed the factories to re-open.

35 workers from Silves were put on trial and found guilty, 12 belonging to the communist group and 23 to the CGT group, and transferred to Angra do Heroísmo in the Azores. The majority served 12 years in prison, with several dying. Some strikers were tried and acquitted but were prevented from returning to their homes by the local administrator. Furthermore, the Estado Novo retaliated against Silves by effectively closing the town's cork industry, thereby reducing employment opportunities. Many workers ended up moving to other cork-processing centres.

== Memorials ==
- A "House-Museum" to record the events of 18 January 1934 in Marinha Grande was opened in the town in 2008 in a converted worker's cottage.
- A memorial to the strikers was unveiled in Marinha Grande in 1989.
