= Max Nomad =

Austrian-American anarchist (1881–1973)

Max Nomad was the pseudonym of Maximilian Nacht (15 September 1881 – 18 April 1973), an Austrian-born American author and educator. In his youth he espoused militant anarchism and in the 1920s he was a supporter of the Bolshevik Revolution. From the 1940s he was for many years a politics lecturer in the United States.

== Life ==
Maximilian Nacht was born in 1881, into a wealthy Jewish family in Buchach, eastern Galicia (now in Ukraine). Before World War I, he lived in Austria and attended the University of Vienna.

He died in 1973.

== Career ==
From 1903 to 1907 Max, his older brother Siegfried and, sometimes, Senna Hoy in Zürich edited five volumes of a militant journal, Der Weckruf (The Alarm). In 1908 Max went to live in Kraków, where he became involved, along with Jan Wacław Machajski, in setting up a group called Workers' Conspiracy.

Max's brother Siegfried, later Stephen, emigrated to the United States at the end of 1912, and Max followed in 1913.

During the 1920s Max Nacht wrote pro-Soviet articles using the pseudonym "Max Nomad." However, he distanced himself from Stalinism in 1929. Writing in Scribner's Magazine in 1934, he coined the phrase capitalism without capitalists to describe the Soviet system.

A Guggenheim Fellow in 1937, he became a lecturer in politics and history at New York University, the New School for Social Research and the Rand School of Social Science.

Nomad wrote of himself:

I remain a lone-wolf philosophical anarchist whose sympathies go out to the poorest of the poor struggling for more and more of the good things of life. But I feel akin only to those rebellious but politically unattached intellectuals who dream of justice and an equal chance for everybody, but know, as I do, that, given the eternal recurrence of predatory elites, and the incurable ignorance and gullibility of the masses, a privileged and educated minority will always rule and exploit the uneducated majority.

== Works ==
- Die revolutionäre Bewegung in Rußland. Neues Leben, Berlin 1902
- Rebellen-Lieder Arnold Roller (Siegfried Nacht), Max Nacht (eds), 1906
- Rebels and Renegades. New York 1932. 430 pp.
- Apostles of Revolution. Little, Brown & Co., Boston 1939. 467 pp.
- A Skeptic's Political Dictionary and Handbook for the Disenchanted. New York 1953. 171 pp.
- Aspects of Revolt. New York [1959]. 311 pp.
- Political Heretics from Plato to Mao Tse-Tung. Ann Arbor 1963
- Dreamers, Dynamiters and Demagogues: Reminiscences. New York [1964]. 251 pp.
- The Anarchist Tradition and Other Essays. 1967. 398 pp.
- Masters--Old and New 1979
- White Collars and Horny Hands: The Revolutionary Thought of Waclaw Machajski 1983
