= Anarchism in Portugal =

Anarchism in Portugal (Portuguese: Anarquismo) first appeared in the form of organized groups in the mid-1880s. It was present from the first steps of the workers' movement, revolutionary unionism and anarcho-syndicalism had a lasting influence on the General Confederation of Labour, founded in 1919.

The 28 May 1926 coup d'état established a National Dictatorship that harshly repressed the workers' movement. The Estado Novo made any anarchist activity illegal, which forced the libertarian movement to clandestine action. In 1974, after the fall of the dictatorship in the Carnation Revolution, the Hot Summer of 1975 brought about a sense of "anarcho-populism", a residue of the spirit of May 1968.

== History ==
During the 1850s, the first Portuguese workers' organisations were established along mutualist lines, influenced by the writings of Pierre-Joseph Proudhon. By the 1870s, some of these organisations began to federate together and dedicate themselves to class struggle, with the Portuguese Socialist Party (PSP) becoming the first national workers' organisation in the country. The Portuguese section of the International Workingmen's Association was formed in 1871.

During this time, the two-party system that governed the Kingdom of Portugal broke down, before finally collapsing in the 1890s. As constitutional monarchy lost popularity, republicanism, anarchism and syndicalism began to gain ground.

=== Emergence of the libertarian movement ===
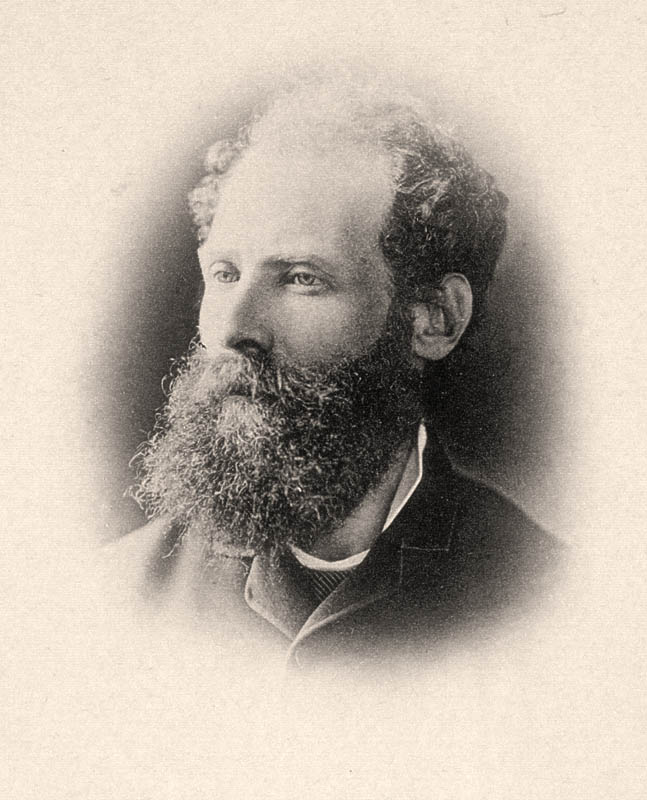
Antero de Quental

The first anarchist groups appeared in the mid-1880s. A period of intense editorial activity then began, as several dozen anarchist periodicals were published throughout the country. Under the influence of Élisée Reclus and Peter Kropotkin, libertarian communism appeared in Lisbon and Porto around 1886–1887, with the publication of a few libertarian periodicals and the establishment of the first agitprop groups. The Portuguese state also legalized trade unions in 1891.

Along with trade unionism, propaganda was developed in particular by journalist José do Vale, editor of the newspapers O Petardo and La Dinamite. The "exemplary gesture" is practically daily and appears, in a way, as a complement to "legal action", when this has exhausted its possibilities. A wave of individual attacks targeted journalists (such as Manuel Pinheiro Chagas in February 1888 for disrespecting Louise Michel), bosses, representatives of the State or the judiciary such as Judge Barros in 1896.

Faced with the specter of "revolutionary terror", the State adopted in 1896 – following the example of the French villainous laws – a special law against anarchist activities. This law reproduced in Portugal the repressive policies of other countries which targeted anarchists and the labor movement, culminating in the International Conference of Rome for the Social Defense Against Anarchists in 1898.

=== Rise of anarcho-syndicalism ===
By the time that the anti-anarchist law was passed, the Portuguese anarchist movement had grown to count 36 groups; they were largely concentrated in the north, where anarchists in Porto supported the Revolutionary Socialist Workers' Federation, a splinter of the PSP which counted 13,000 members. After the passage of the anti-anarchist law, many more anarchists integrated themselves into the syndicalist movement and joined the federation, provoking the organisation's leadership to dissolve itself back into the PSP. By the turn of the 20th century, trade unions in Portugal were largely dominated by the PSP; anarchists held a comparatively minor amount of influence.

Despite lacking a national trade union centre in Portugal, acts of sabotage and strike actions increased during the early 1900s, culminating in a workers' uprising in Coimbra and a general strike in Porto. As more local unions were formed, calls for unity between them led to national workers' congresses, which were held in Lisbon and Porto in July 1909. The majority of the congress was dominated by the PSP, which passed a resolution to formally affiliate the workers' congress with the party. The revolutionary syndicalist minority left the congress and, in September 1909, held their own. Attendees included delegates from 31 trade unions and a number of cooperatives, mostly from Lisbon and the south. The congress demanded the eight-hour day, declared their intention to establish workers' control over production and called for the establishment of a General Confederation of Labour (CGT), along the lines of the Charter of Amiens. In Porto, syndicalists established the General Union of Workers (UGT), which grew to count 11,000 workers. At the second syndicalist congress in May 1911, which was supported by both the Lisbon and Porto groups, anarcho-syndicalism became the driving principle of the movement. By this time, 100,000 Portuguese people were employed as industrial workers, half of whom were women and children.

When the monarchy was overthrown in the 5 October 1910 revolution, a massive strike wave broke out, with more than 250 strikes taking place in the first year of the First Portuguese Republic. Wildcat strikes paralysed many factories, shops and farms, while railway workers and cork workers took direct action by destroying company property. In Évora, a dispute between workers and landowners escalated into a mass strike by 20,000 workers. The agricultural workers were supported by the Portuguese syndicalist movement, which called a general strike, paralysing most of the country; an armed uprising in Lisbon briefly brought the city under workers' control. But the government was able to divide the movement by offering agricultural unions wage increases and releasing arrested farm workers, while unionised workers in Lisbon were arrested and imprisoned.

=== The General Confederation of Labor ===
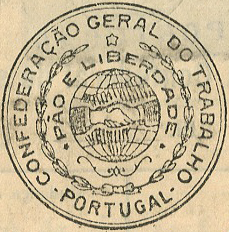
Logo of the CGT.

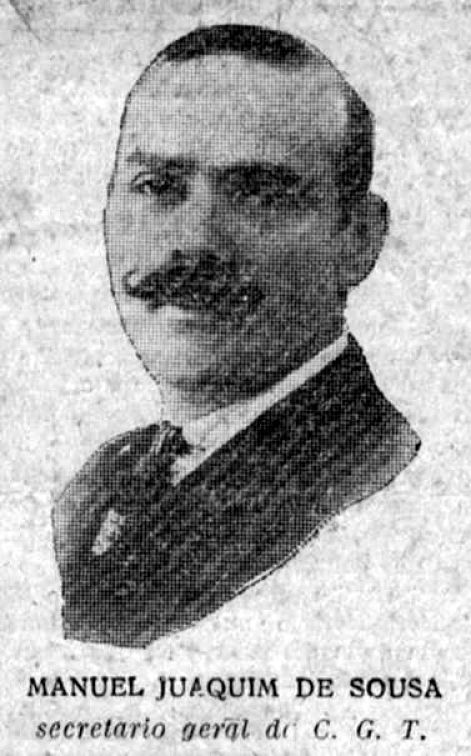
Manuel Joaquim de Sousa, first general secretary of the CGT.

Under the influence of revolutionary unionism, workers' structures developed very rapidly from 1909. The General Confederation of Labour was founded on 18 September 1919 in Coimbra, on libertarian bases. Manuel Joaquim de Sousa was elected general secretary. The fundamental principles and objectives of the CGT, adopted at this congress are: the free autonomous federation of workers; direct action – outside any political or religious influence – with a view to eliminating the wage system; the collectivization of the means of production; the internationalism of workers' solidarity and the elimination of capitalism. The confederation created a newspaper A Batalha (The battle) which defended revolutionary unionist positions.

It was not until 1922, after joining the International Workers' Association that the CGT asserted itself as anarcho-syndicalist. Until the end of the 1930s, anarcho-syndicalism was the majority current in the labor movement. It was only following the Bolsheviks seizure of power in Russia, and the subjugation of local workers' organizations to the Portuguese Communist Party, that this influence was marginalized.

=== The Iberian Anarchist Federation ===
A few days before the 28 May 1926 coup d'état, on the initiative of Manuel Joaquim de Sousa, the Iberian Anarchist Federation (Portuguese: Federação Anarquista Ibérica, FAI) was founded in Marseille, at the second Congress of the Federation of Spanish-speaking anarchist groups. Influenced by the example of the Argentine Regional Workers' Federation, the objective was to strengthen the anarchist character of the Spanish National Confederation of Labour and the Portuguese General Confederation of Labour, by creating joint committees bringing together FAI members and trade unionists to move the union away from the influence of Republican political groups. The term Iberian referred to his desire to unify the Portuguese and Spanish anarchist movement in a pan-Iberian organization. Given the political instability in Spain, its headquarters were in Lisbon.

=== The military dictatorship and repression ===
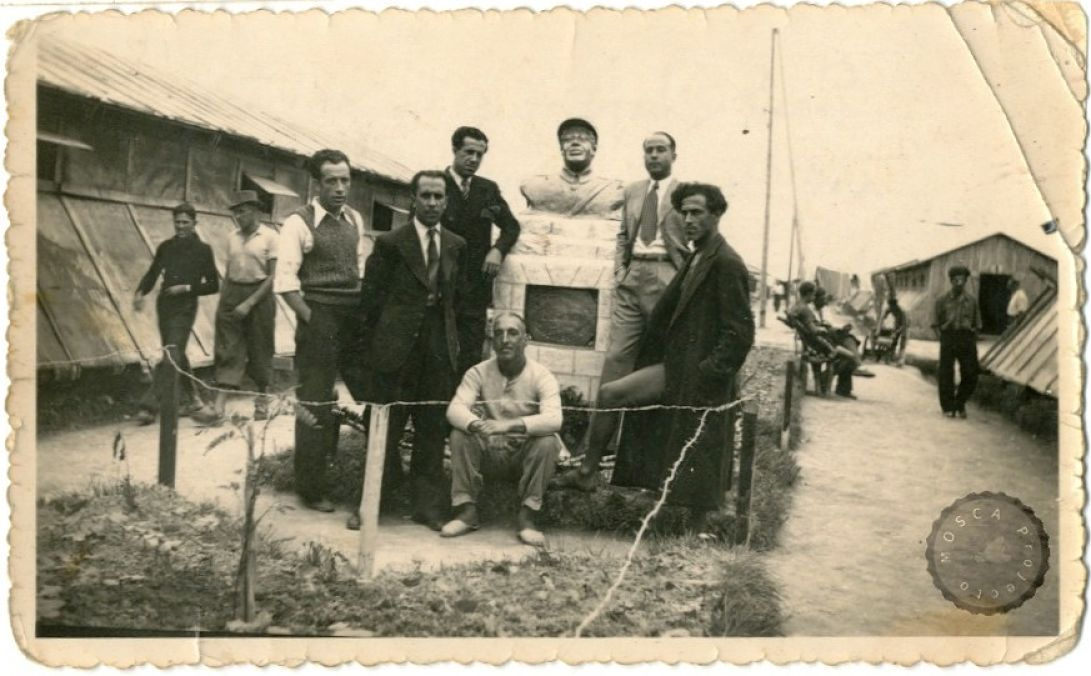
CGT militants, imprisoned in the Peniche Fortress in 1934.

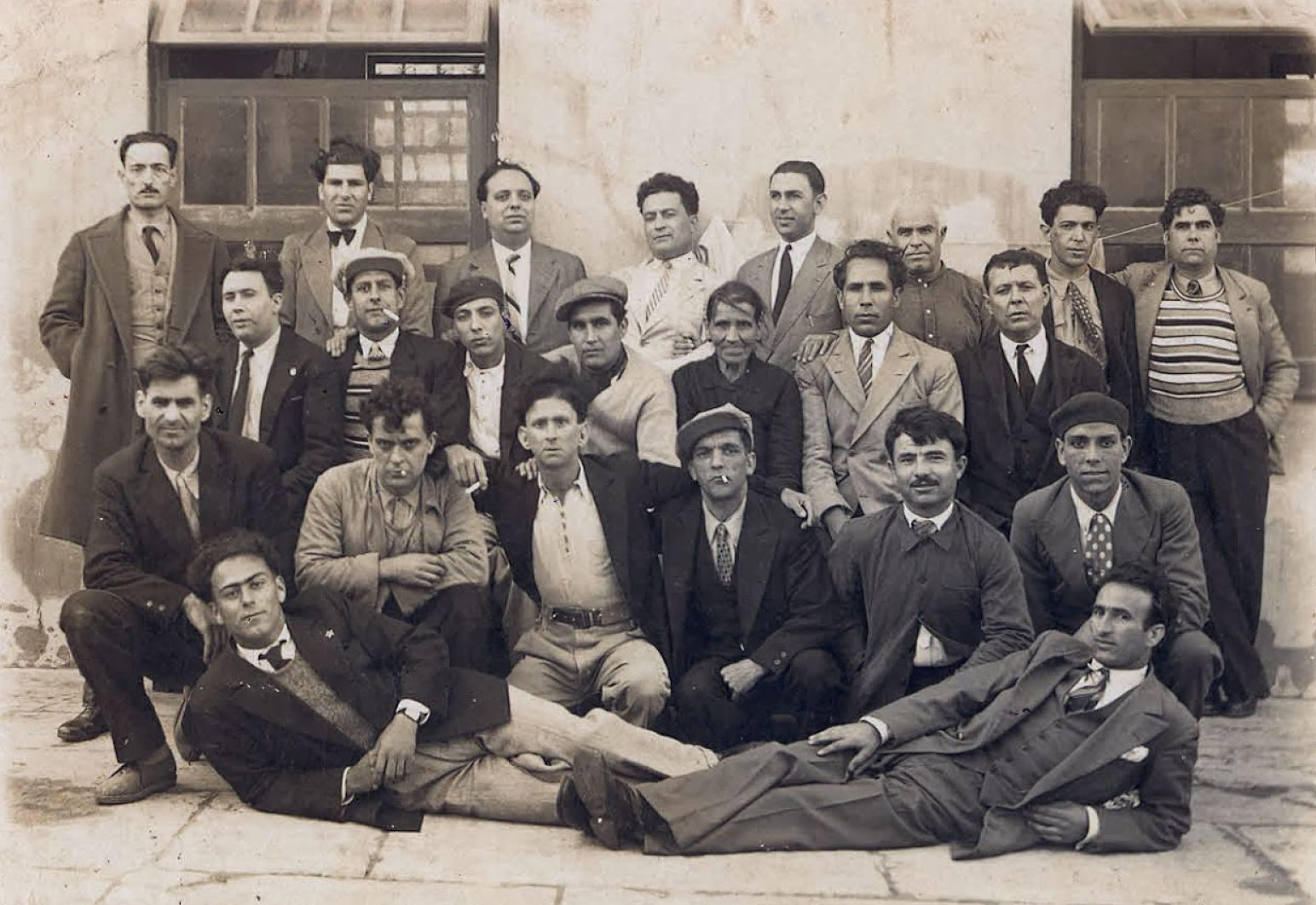
Political prisoners of the CGT in Peniche in December 1934.

In 1926, a military coup led by Manuel Gomes da Costa put an end to the First Portuguese Republic. In 1933, under the leadership of António de Oliveira Salazar, a new constitution was proclaimed, the Estado Novo. In the new, authoritarian, one-party state, strikes were declared illegal and the workers' and employers' unions came under state control. The CGT and its newspaper were banned. Many anarcho-syndicalist activists are arrested and imprisoned. In 1936, the Tarrafal concentration camp was opened on Santiago Island, in Cape Verde.

On 4 July 1937, a group of anarchists, including Emídio Santana, attempted to assassinate Salazar while he was going to mass, but the dictator narrowly escaped the attack. Santana was now wanted by PIDE and fled to the United Kingdom, where he was arrested by the English police and extradited to Portugal. He was sentenced to 8 years in prison and 12 years of deportation. He was not released until 23 May 1953. The repression that followed this attempted attack was such that there was hardly any anarchist movement from that time on. It was the Portuguese Communist Party which developed and which, with the support of the Soviet Union, became the main force in opposition to the dictatorial regime.

=== Contemporary period ===
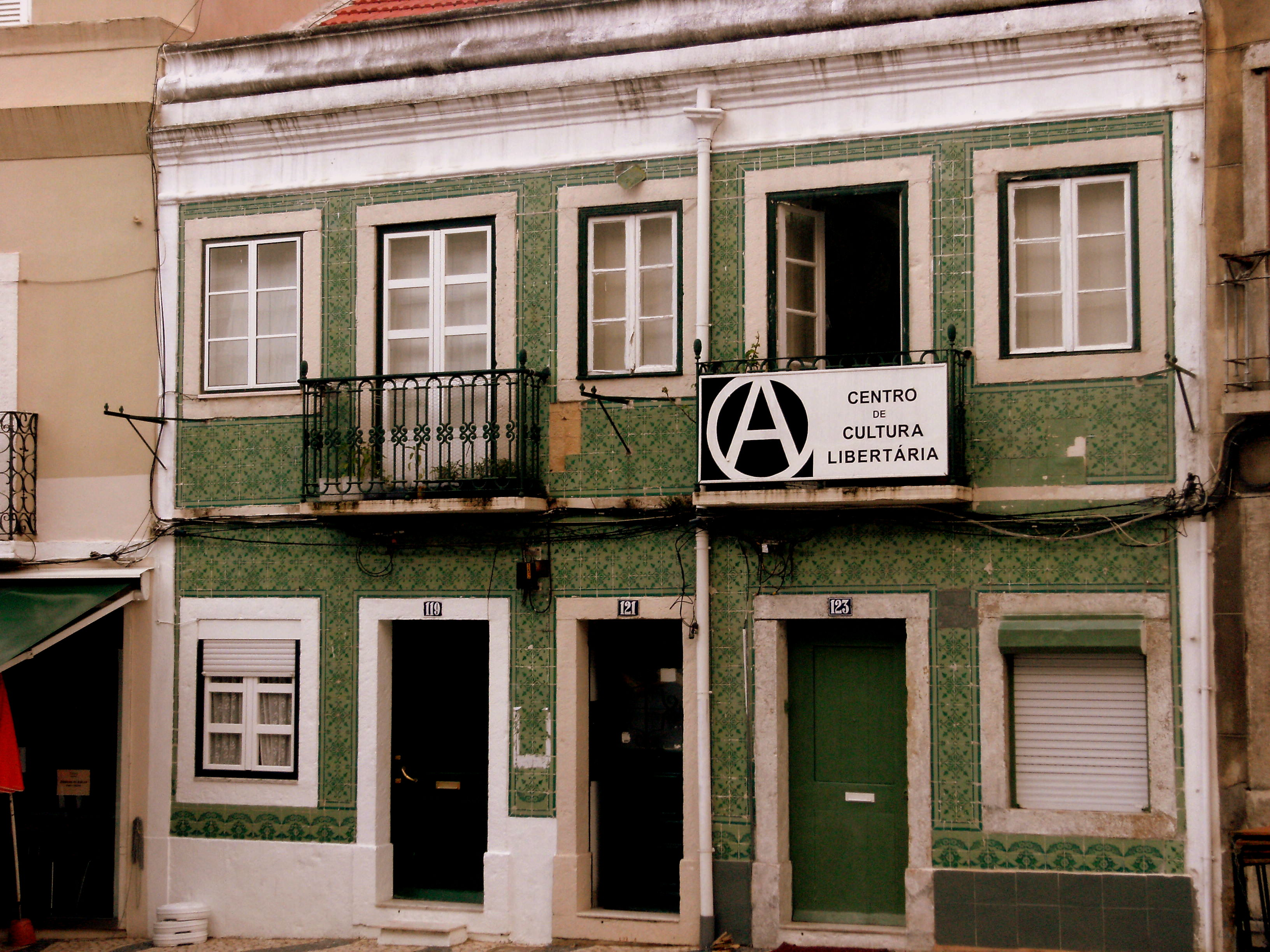
The Libertarian Culture Center, an anarchist space in Almada, 2012.

Currently, the anarchist movement in Portugal has little organized expression, with only one national organization, the Portuguese Section of the International Workers' Association, with branches in Guimarães, Lisbon and Porto. In Lisbon there is also the Colectivo Estudantil Libertário de Lisboa, with presence in secondary schools and colleges. In Almada, there is a Libertarian Culture Center.

There have been some attempts to federate various anarchist and libertarian groups and individuals in modern times, with the main examples being União Libertária and Rede de Apoio Mútuo.

== See also ==
- Category:Portuguese anarchists
- List of anarchist movements by region
- Anarchism in Angola
- Anarchism in Brazil
- Anarchism in East Timor
- Anarchism in Spain

== Bibliography ==
- Bayerlein, Bernhard; van der Linden, Marcel (1990). "Revolutionary Syndicalism in Portugal". In van der Linden, Marcel; Thorpe, Wayne (eds.). Revolutionary Syndicalism: an International Perspective. Aldershot: Scolar Press. pp. 155–166. ISBN 0-85967-815-6.
- Da Fonseca, Carlos (1973). Introduction à l'histoire du mouvement libertaire au Portugal (PDF) (in French). Lausanne: Centre International de Recherches sur l'Anarchisme.
- Damier, Vadim (2009) [2000]. Anarcho-syndicalism in the 20th Century. Translated by Archibald, Malcolm. Edmonton: Black Cat Press. ISBN 978-0-9737827-6-9.
- Pacheco Pereira, José (1983). "L'historiographie Ouvrière Au Portugal". Le Mouvement Social (in French) (123): 99–108. doi:10.2307/3777842. JSTOR 3777842..
- Freire, João (2002). Les anarchistes du Portugal (in French). Éditions CNT-Région parisienne. ISBN 978-2951616318.
- Freire, João (2017). "Panorama des mouvements sociaux : le Portugal, XIXe, XXe siècles". Variations (in French) (20). doi:10.4000/variations.838.
- Clímaco Pereira, Ana Cristina (1998). L'exil politique portugais en France et en Espagne, 1927–1940 (These de doctorat). Thèse de doctorat en Histoire sous la direction de Andrée Bachoud (in French). Université Paris-Diderot.
- Gonçalves, Cécile (2011). "Salazar et la Guerre civile espagnole". Diacronie (in French) (7). doi:10.4000/diacronie.3255.
- Bigotte Chorão, Luís (2015). Para uma História da Repressão do Anarquismo em Portugal no Século XIX (in Portuguese). Letra Livre.
- Rodrigues, Edgar (1999). História do Movimento Anarquista em Portugal (PDF) (in Portuguese). Universo Ácrata, Editora Insular Florianópolis.
