= Bernhard H. Bayerlein =

German historian (born 1949)

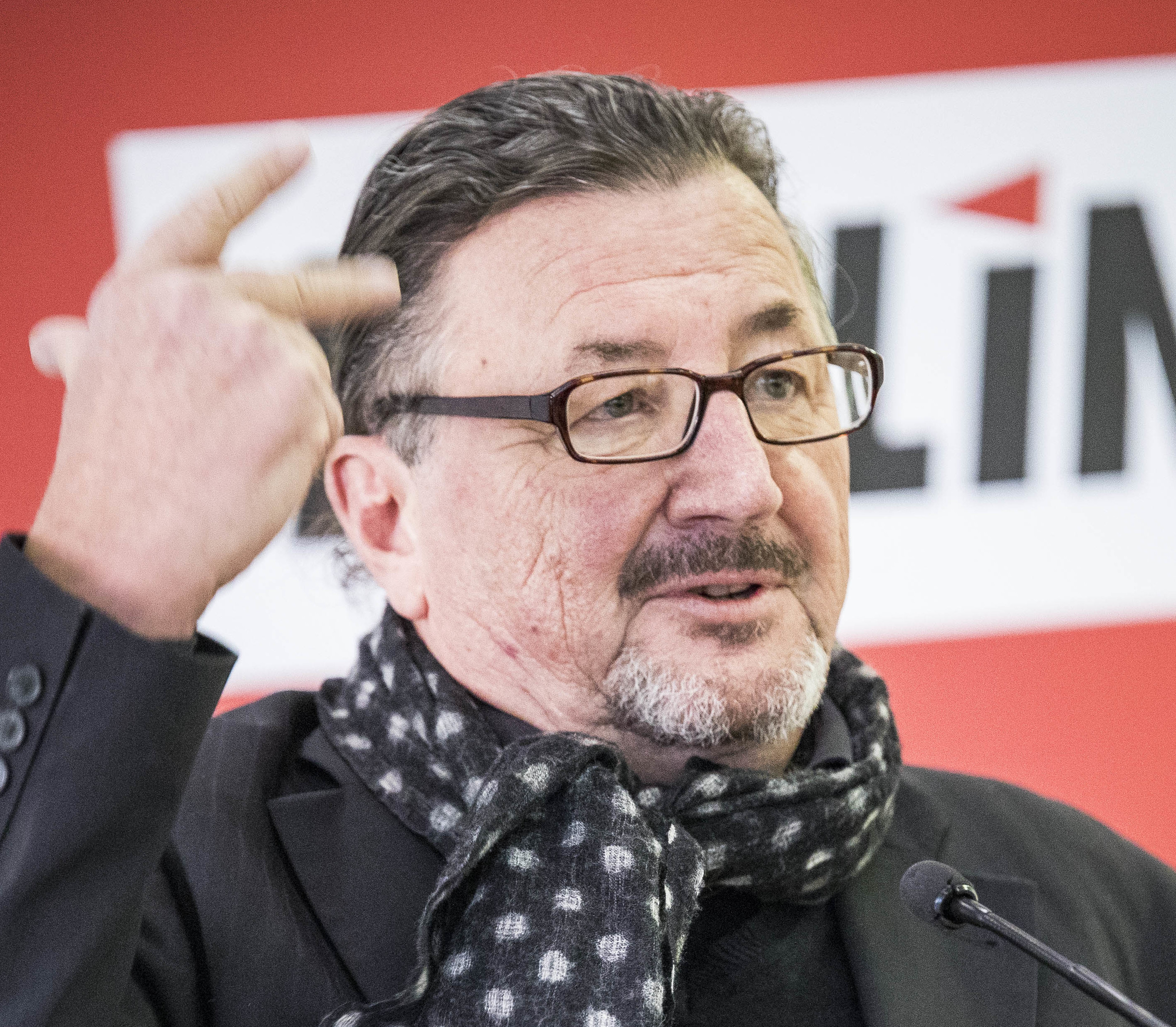
- Bayerlein in 2018
- Born: Bernhard H. Bayerlein; 1949 (age 76–77); Wiesbaden, Hesse, West Germany

Education
- Education: Ruhr-University Bochum

Philosophical work
- Era: Late modern and contemporary
- Region: Europe
- School: Frankfurt School
- Main interests: Transnational communism, German-French and German-Russian relations (1920–1950), history of social movements, political movements and cultural movements, Portuguese studies, Spanish studies, comparative political science
- Website: www.dr-baerlein.eu

Bernhard H. Bayerlein (born 1949, in Wiesbaden, Hesse) is a German professor, historian and honorary senior researcher at the Ruhr-University Bochum. His work includes the study of transnational communism, the history of social, political and cultural movements, and of the labour movement, as well as Portuguese and Spanish studies and comparative politics, including semi-presidentialism.
