= Stephen Naft =

Writer and anarchist (1878–1956)

- Born: 1878; Vienna, Austria
- Died: December 12, 1956 (aged 78); Flushing, New York, United States
- Relatives: Max Nomad (brother)

Stephen Naft (born Siegfried Nacht; 1878–1956), also known by the pseudonym Arnold Roller, was a writer, translator, and anarcho-syndicalist.

== Life ==
Siegfried Nacht was born in 1878 in Vienna. He worked as an electrical engineer in cities across Europe, where he also spoke and wrote on behalf of syndicalism. Nacht traveled by foot through the Alps and Pyrenees, Spain and North Africa to spread his politics. He wrote for the anarchist press beginning in 1901, usually under the pen name Arnold Roller. Nacht published his "The General Strike and the Social Revolution" pamphlet in London in 1902. Switzerland expelled him in August 1905. He entered Tyrol, Austria.

He emigrated to the United States in 1912, where he changed his name to Stephen Naft. He naturalized in 1920. Being conversant in six languages, Naft led The American Exporter's translation bureau for ten years and served as a technical editor. Afterwards, he worked for other foreign-language news organizations in the United States and Latin America. He was an editor for the French Havas news agency in 1934–1935. During World War II, he served as a local research coordinator in the Office of the Coordinator of Inter-American Affairs. Though he grew less political, he continued to promote anarcho-syndicalism, edited Living Age, and founded the Freedom Publishing Company in New York.

Nacht died on December 12, 1956, in a Flushing nursing home. He had been blind for the last few years of his life. His wife, Mabel Wood Naft, survived him, as did his brother, Max Nomad, who was more prominently known in the United States.
