= Madeira uprising =

The Madeira uprising, also referred to as the Island Revolt or the Revolt of the Deported, was a military uprising against the government of the National Dictatorship (1926–1933) that took place on the island of Madeira, beginning in the early hours of 4 April 1931.

On 26th January 1931, the government took control over imported grain, causing the price of flour and bread to rise dramatically. Due to high unemployment in the region, this worsened an already poor situation, and strikes and riots began to break out.

== Timeline ==
On 4 April, rebels began to arrest those loyal to the government in Lisbon, including the High Commissioner, and occupied buildings in Funchal, as well as taking over phone and telegram services. The rebels appointed General Sousa Diaz, who had been exiled to Madeira by the Lisbon government, as their leader.

On 8 April the rebellion spread to some islands of the Azores and, on 17 April, reached Portuguese Guinea. There were also attempts at military recruitment in Mozambique and on the island of São Tomé, which failed early on. Military mutinies, planned for the continent, never occurred.

The rebellious military in the Azores, lacking popular support, surrendered soon without a fight, between 17 and 20 April 1931. In Madeira, where rebels had won popular support, taking advantage of the discontent generated by the government's restrictive economic policy to alleviate the effects of the international crisis of 1929, the uprising was only neutralized on 2 May, with the arrival of a military expedition which crushed the revolting forces after seven days of fighting.

The Portuguese Navy, although small at the time, set sail on 24 April to Madeira, led by Commander Magalhães Correia, arriving on 27 April. The uprising was only neutralized on 2 May, after seven days of fighting. Following the defeat of the uprising in Madeira on 6 May 1931, the rebels in Portuguese Guinea also surrendered.
