= General Confederation of Workers (Chile) =

Chilean trade union federation

- Confederación General de Trabajadores
- Abbreviation: CGT
- Predecessor: Industrial Workers of the World; Chilean Regional Workers' Federation
- Merged into: Central Union of Workers
- Formation: November 1931; 94 years ago
- Dissolved: 12 February 1953; 73 years ago
- Type: National trade union federation
- Members: 25,000 (1931)
- General Secretary: Luís Heredia
- Main organ: La Protesta

The General Confederation of Workers (

Spanish: Confederación General de Trabajadores; (Note: Also translated as the General Workers' Confederation, the General Labor Confederation or the General Confederation of Labor.) CGT) was a Chilean anarcho-syndicalist trade union federation. Formed in 1931 by remnants of the Industrial Workers of the World (IWW) and the Chilean Regional Workers' Federation (FORCh), the CGT grew to count 25,000 members and led a series of strike actions during the early 1930s, notably winning a 36-hour work week for construction workers. After the formation of the Confederation of Chilean Workers (CTCH) by the Popular Front in 1936, the CGT lost most of its members to the communist and socialist unions, which were better placed to offer workers guarantees. Its strategy of violent direct action also provoked repression. By the 1940s, it had declined into irrelevance, and in 1953, it merged into the Central Union of Workers (CUT).

== Background ==
Anarchism was first brought to Chile by immigrant workers from Germany, Italy and Spain, who began organizing themselves into trade unions in the early 20th century. Anarchist unions brought together bakers, carpenters, dockworkers, printers and shoemakers, led strike actions and aligned themselves with the nascent student movement. Anarchists took a leading role in the 1903 Valparaíso dockworkers' strike and the 1905 Santiago meat riots, which they believed to have failed due to the lack of a general strike to support it. From 1906 to 1907, the anarchist Carpenters' Federation led a series of strikes in Santiago. In 1913, anarchists established the newspaper La Batalla, which became the largest anarchist newspaper in the country, running until 1925. And from 1917 to 1918, the anarchist Shoemakers' Federation led a series of strikes. Anarchists also constituted the far-left wing of the Federation of Chilean Workers (FOCH) and remained active within it until 1921, by which time it fell under the control of the Communist Party of Chile. The rise of organized anarchism culminated in 1919, with the establishment of a Chilean branch of the Industrial Workers of the World (IWW), which adapted the tactics of industrial unionism and anarcho-syndicalism to the country's labor movement. It organized bakers, construction workers, printers, shoemakers, students and teachers, but it held the most influence among dockworkers in Antofagasta, Iquique and Valparaíso. It never achieved the organizational strength of the FOCH or even that of the Catholic unions.

== Establishment ==
In 1925, the IWW experienced a split over whether to use a regional structure based on craft unionism, rather than the industrial unionist model; many bakers, dockworkers and printers subsequently broke away to establish the Chilean Regional Workers' Federation (FORCh), which adopted a regional model. With the rise of the military dictatorship of Carlos Ibáñez del Campo in 1927, the IWW and FORCh were both suppressed and their leaders were imprisoned or driven into exile. Under these conditions, Chilean anarchists from both organizations began seeking to reunify their movement. After the Ibáñez dictatorship fell, in November 1931, the remnants of the IWW and FORCh came together to establish a new trade union center, the General Confederation of Workers (

Spanish: Confederación General de Trabajadores; CGT). Breaking from the old IWW model of industrial unionism, the CGT adopted the regional structure of the Argentine Regional Workers' Federation (FORA). Its general secretary was Luís Heredia. Its official newspaper, La Protesta, became the main organ of the Chilean anarchist movement.

== Organization ==
At the time of its founding, the CGT counted 25,000 members and 35 affiliate unions. Its membership was largely derived from well-paid skilled workers and artisans. These included unions of carpenters, electricians, painters, and printers, as well as construction workers, dockworkers and shoemakers. Its leather workers' and shoemakers' industrial union was known for being especially combative. However, some anarchist unions, including the Plasterer's Union, opted to remain independent of the CGT. It also counted local federations in 10 cities – Concepción, Curicó, Rancagua, La Serena, Osorno, Santiago, Talca, Temuco, Valdivia, Valparaíso – as well as smaller affiliates in Antofagasta, Iquique and Viña del Mar.

== Early activities ==
The CGT was mainly active during the mid-1930s, when it led a series of successful strike actions that achieved wage increases and reduced working hours. The CGT construction workers' union, led by Félix López Cáceres, achieved a 36-hour work week in that sector. It also mobilized people in protest against the rising cost of living during the early 1930s. It was one of the only Latin American anarcho-syndicalist organizations to survive the political repressions of the 1930s, alongside the Bolivian Local Workers' Federation (FOL) and the Uruguayan Regional Workers' Federation (FORU). Between 1932 and 1936, the CGT held three national conventions; it also held two more over the subsequent decade. Nevertheless, it remained a relatively marginal organization. While most anarcho-syndicalists were tending away from ideological rigidity, the CGT went the other way; at its founding congress, it declared libertarian communism to be its ultimate goal. As an anarcho-syndicalist organization, the CGT rejected the legalitarian labor movement that had emerged after the fall of the dictatorship and refused to abide by the country's labor laws. It also had some ties with the Trotskyist faction of the Communist Party, led by Manuel Hidalgo. In 1936, the CGT dispatched López Caceres to fight in the Spanish Civil War; he joined up with the militia column commanded by Cipriano Mera.

== Decline ==
As the Chilean industrial economy modernized, it moved away from more artisanal forms of craft, causing the social base of the anarchist CGT to decline. As the CGT rejected arbitration and employed violent tactics of direct action, it became a target for repression, with many of its actions resulting in mass layoffs of its members. Unable to achieve success in industrial actions, the CGT lost much of its support to the legalitarian unions, who provided better legal protections and profit sharing opportunities. By 1936, the CGT counted 15,000 members, according to government estimates. After the formation of the Popular Front in 1936, it lost most of its membership to the larger communist and socialist unions.

The Popular Front sponsored the formation of a new national trade union center, the Confederation of Chilean Workers (CTCH), which would defend workers' economic interests and, after the election of Pedro Aguirre Cerda as president, collaborate with the government. The anarchists of the CGT refused to join the CTCH, opposing its legalitarian orientation and its collaboration with the Popular Front, which split the Chilean labor movement. Most unions joined the new confederation, leaving syndicalist unions a minority within the labor movement. In 1939, the CGT organized a printers' strike, but the CTCH did not support it.

As they declined into irrelevance, Chilean anarchists became increasingly pessimistic about the prospects of their movement's success, and whether it would be possible to overthrow the Chilean state in a general strike without a wider upheaval throughout Latin America. Many anarchists merged into left-wing parties of the Popular Front, with Communist party leader Carlos Contreras Labarca and Socialist Party leader Oscar Schnake hailing from anarchist backgrounds. Anarchist principles of anti-capitalism, anti-clericalism and anti-statism continued to constitute major tendencies within the reorganized Chilean left until the mid-1940s.

== Dissolution ==
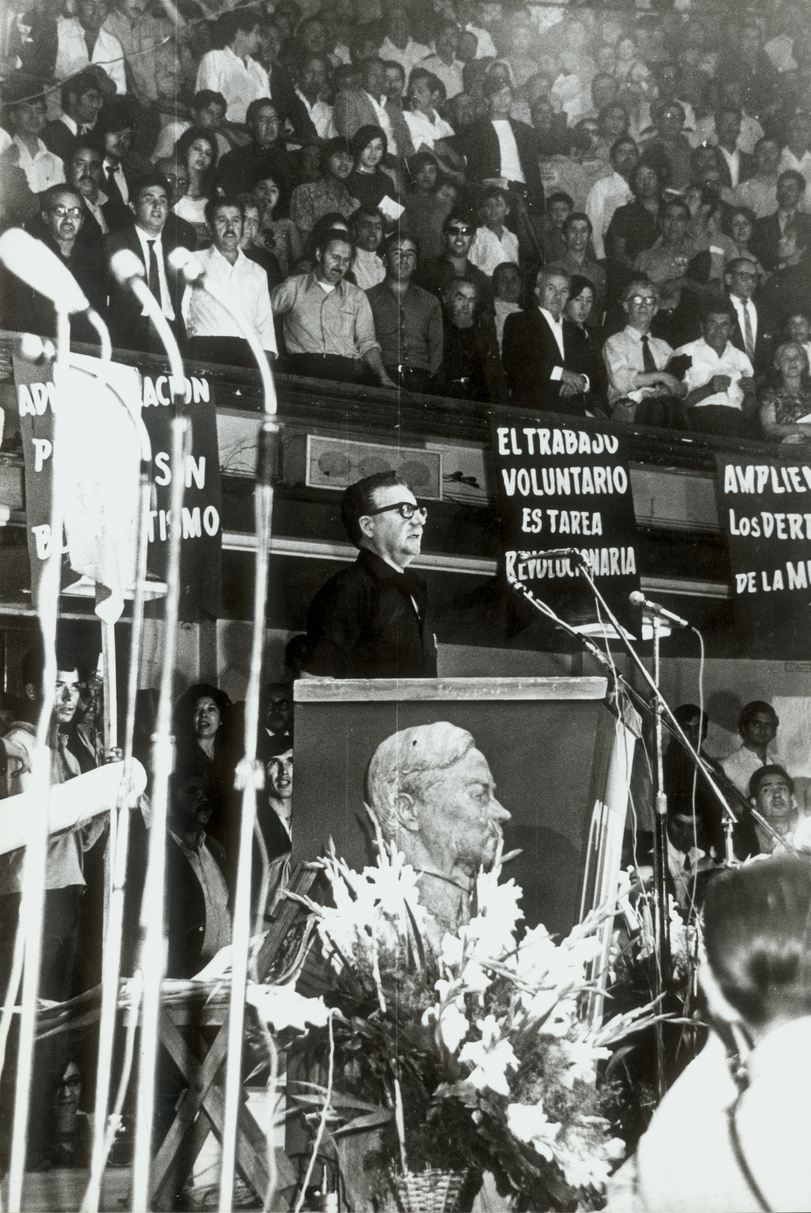
President Salvador Allende, speaking at a conference of the Central Union of Workers (CUT) in 1971

By the early 1940s, the CGT had lost most of its influence over the Chilean labor movement. By 1946, the CGT had declined into a rump organization. In 1953, it merged with the CTCH to form the Central Union of Workers (

Spanish: Central Única de Trabajadores; CUT). This move coincided with that of the Bolivian FOL, which merged into the Bolivian Workers' Center (COB) around the same time. Although anarcho-syndicalists held a minority of unions in the new CUT, they still held a leading influence; anarchists constituted 7.9% of delegates in CUT elections and four anarchists sat on the CUT executive. But after a failed general strike, in 1957, most anarcho-syndicalists (including the leadership) withdrew from the organization and the share of anarchist delegates declined to 2%. In 1960, the anarchists who withdrew from the CUT established the National Confederation of Workers (CNT), although this would remain only a marginal organization. By the early 1960s, anarchists held little remaining influence within the Chilean labor movement.

== Bibliography ==
- Alba, Victor (1968). Politics and the Labor Movement in Latin America. Stanford University Press. LCCN 66-15298.
- Alexander, Robert J. (1962). "Organized Labor in Chile". Labor Relations in Argentina, Brazil, and Chile. McGraw Hill. pp. 253–264. LCCN 61-17334.
- Alexander, Robert J.; Parker, Eldon (2009). "Anarcho-Syndicalist Unions and ACAT". International Labor Organizations and Organized Labor in Latin America and the Caribbean. Bloomsbury Publishing. pp. 1–10. ISBN 9780313381836.
- Angell, Alan (1972). "History of the Labour Movement and its Legacy". Politics and the Labour Movement in Chile. Oxford University Press. pp. 11–41. ISBN 0-19-214991-1.
- Damier, Vadim (2009) [2000]. Anarcho-syndicalism in the 20th Century. Translated by Archibald, Malcolm. Edmonton: Black Cat Press. ISBN 978-0-9737827-6-9.
- DeShazo, Peter (1983). Urban Workers and Labor Unions in Chile, 1902–1927. University of Wisconsin Press. ISBN 0299092208.
- Gambone, Larry (1996). The Libertarian Movement in Chile. Red Lion Press. OCLC 45554330.
- Lamb, James G. (2021). The Labor Plan: Labor, the State and the Labor Code in Chile (1973-2018) (PhD). University of California, Berkeley. ProQuest 28652536.
- Loveman, Brian (1987). "Chile". In Greenfield, Gerald Michael; Maram, Sheldon L. (eds.). Latin American Labor Organizations. New York: Greenwood Press. pp. 129–178. ISBN 0-313-22834-5.
- Simon, S. Fanny (1946). "Anarchism and Anarcho-Syndicalism in South America". The Hispanic American Historical Review. 26 (1). Duke University Press: 38–59. doi:10.2307/2507692. ISSN 1527-1900. JSTOR 2507692.
- van der Walt, Lucien; Schmidt, Michael (2009). Black Flame: The Revolutionary Class Politics of Anarchism and Syndicalism. Edinburgh: AK Press. ISBN 978-1-904859-16-1. LCCN 2006933558. OCLC 1100238201.
