= Workers' Federation of Chile =

Chilean trade union federation

- Federación de Trabajadores de Chile
- Abbreviation: FTCh
- Successor: Regional Workers' Federation of Chile
- Established: June 1906; 120 years ago
- Dissolved: May 1908; 118 years ago
- Type: Trade union federation
- Location: Santiago, Chile
- Members: 10,000 (1907)
- Main organ: El Alba

The Workers' Federation of Chile (Spanish: Federación de Trabajadores de Chile; FTCh) was a Chilean anarchist trade union federation. It was established in 1906 by a number of resistance societies, which had grown in strength during the early 1900s. It coordinated strikes, solidarity actions and mutual aid, while prohibiting any political activism within its ranks. In mid-1907, the FTCh called a general strike in solidarity with striking rail workers, but it ultimately collapsed due to a lack of coordination between different industries. Crackdowns against union activity by employers and the government caused many unions to break up, leading to the dissolution of the FTCh in mid-1908. Resistance societies were later re-established in the 1910s, culminating with the establishment of a Chilean branch of the Industrial Workers of the World (IWW).

== Background ==
Anarchism and socialism were first brought to Chile from Argentina in the late 19th century. Many immigrant anarchists from Germany, Italy and Spain also settled in the country and began organizing themselves into trade unions. Out of the thirty trade unions in Chile at the beginning of the 20th century, ten were organized by anarchists, who were particularly active among dockworkers. In 1893, anarchist dockworkers attempted to establish the country's first national trade union federation, but it quickly collapsed within a year. The organized labor movement in Chile grew rapidly during the early 1900s, with anarchists establishing numerous resistance societies (Spanish: Sociedades de resistencia) to bring together skilled workers in the Central Chilean cities of Santiago and Valparaíso. The first had been formed by railway workers in 1898.

The resistance societies distinguished themselves from the more moderate mutualist societies, which upheld class collaboration rather than class struggle. The resistance societies were organized by industry, with no separation between trades, so strike actions were capable of completely halting industrial operations. They mostly organized artisans and industrial workers, including carpenters, printers, shoemakers, and transport workers. They were also decentralized and regularly rotated leadership roles. Among their main leaders were Alejandro Escobar, who founded the Carpenters' Federation, and Magno Espinoza. In their workplaces, they agitated for the eight-hour working day, wage increases and improvements to working conditions. They also fought against the implementation of company stores and scrip.

Successful strikes for higher wages and better working conditions were carried out in 1902 and 1903. The first successful strike was led by printing workers. Anarchists also participated in the 1903 Valparaíso dockworkers' strike. After the strikes were completed, the resistance societies often dissolved, as many were formed only temporarily for the purposes of coordinating the strike. Strikes were also highly combative, with employers hiring strikebreakers and workers sabotaging company property; labor laws had little effect on industrial disputes. By 1904, most resistance societies had disappeared, either due to repression or a lack of interest among the membership, and the organized anarchist movement went into a period of decline.

== Establishment ==
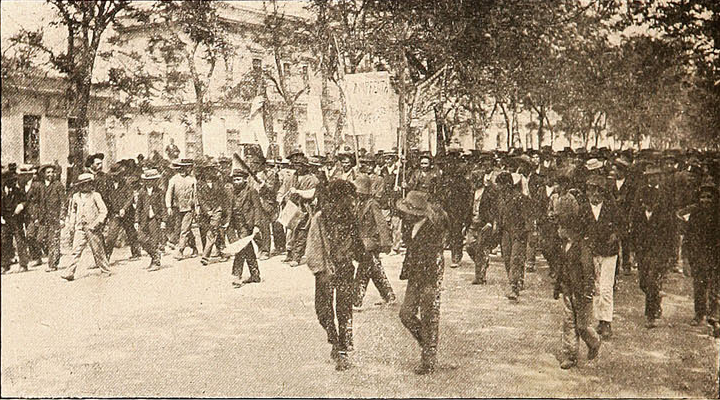
Resistance societies rallying during the meat riots of 1905

Resistance societies were revived again in late 1905, with the growth of the organized labor movement culminating in a wave of strikes for higher wages. Resistance societies were rapidly formed by anarchist bakers, dockworkers, printers, and shoemakers in Santiago and Valparaiso, as well as among miners in Concepcion, transforming the anarchist unions into the strongest radical organizations in the country. They also collaborated closely with the country's growing student movement. In October 1905, anarchists led the Santiago meat riots, but failed to achieve their goal of abolishing tariffs on Argentine meat, which some attributed to a lack of a general strike. The growth of the resistance societies was bolstered by a split in the Democratic Party, as its radical faction led by Luis Emilio Recabarren threw its support behind the anarchist organizations. Recabarren himself had been influenced by the anarchist works of Peter Kropotkin and Errico Malatesta, although he still insisted on political action, which drew criticism from the anarchists. A series of successful strikes also drove increased levels of unionization, with the creation of a Carpenters' Federation preceding the formation of resistance societies by several other trades.

In June 1906, a number of the resistance societies in Santiago came together to establish the Federation of Workers of Chile (Spanish: Federación de Trabajadores de Chile; FTCh), which sought to coordinate existing unions and foment the creation of new workers' organizations. It quickly gained influence in the capital, and by the following year, it had united 24 of the city's 33 resistance societies. In its newspaper El Alba, the FTCh argued that the 1906 Valparaíso earthquake had exacerbated divisions between the working class and the ruling class. At its peak in mid-1907, it counted as many as 10,000 members. Although it was established with the intention of becoming a national trade union federation, it remained largely confined to Santiago. The nascent FTCh, which prohibited political activity and agitated against voting in elections, was opposed by the Doctrinaire faction of the Democratic Party; the latter supported the government of Pedro Montt, denounced the nascent FTCh as a "wolf in sheep's clothing" and attacked anarchists in its publication La Reforma. However, over time the Doctrinaires increasingly aligned themselves with the resistance societies, supporting their strikes and providing them with organizational support.

== Organization ==
Unions that counted more than twenty members, and which agreed not to participate in any political or religious activities, were eligible to join the FTCh. Union dues were ten cents per month for men and five cents per month for women. The FTCh also rejected dual unionism and recognized only one union per craft. With individual unions providing mutual aid was provided to their members, the FTCh itself coordinated strike actions, provided strike funds, and encouraged solidarity actions. Unions were required to present their employers with a petition and obtain the consent of the FTCh before going on strike. They were also required to immediately go on strike if their employers refused to uphold agreed-upon contracts. Due to the decentralized structure of the federation, the influence of individual leaders over the labor movement was limited. Most union leaders, who were not paid for their organizing efforts and who were largely anarchists, did not aspire to political office or hold any permanent power within the movement. By mid-1907, the Chilean organized labor movement had peaked, with the establishment of several resistance societies by both skilled and unskilled workers in Santiago and Valparaíso.

== General strike of 1907 ==
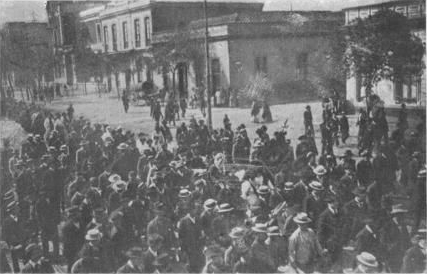
International Workers' Day demonstration in Santiago, in 1907

In the year following the formation of the FTCh, 40 strike actions took place in Santiago, increasing the appeal of joining resistance societies among many workers. On 1 May 1907, the FTCh organized an International Workers' Day demonstration which was attended by 30,000 people, effectively shutting down the city's industry. Later that month, on 27 May, a pay dispute by shop workers at the State Railway Company led to a walkout, which by the beginning of June had escalated into an industry-wide strike, with all of the company's workers throughout central and southern Chile ceasing work. On 5 June, workers of the FTCh in several industries – including construction, metalworking, tanning and textiles – joined the strike in solidarity with the railworkers; this escalated the dispute in Santiago, where more than 15,000 workers had walked out. The government responded by deploying the military to protect rail lines from sabotage, maintain infrastructure and supply lines, and fill in for workers in essential industries. Police also arrested striking workers, which put greater pressure on civil servants and contract employees to return to work.

President Montt also acceded to some of the rail workers' demands, offering a 30% wage increase, future payments at a fixed exchange rate and shorter hours, while promising there would be no punishment for striking workers. But the workers continued to demand payment at a higher exchange rate than the one offered, as solidarity strikes had given them greater leverage. The strike continued to escalate, with resistance societies from various industries calling for the government to accept the rail workers' demands in full, while making no additional demands of their own. On 8 June, the reformist leadership of the strike committee accepted the government's offer and called an end to the strike. The newspapers El Heraldo and La Lei speculated that the committee's decision had been influenced by the increased recruitment of strikebreakers, which made them worried that workers would quit the strike to prevent their jobs from being taken; other papers, such as El Diario Ilustrado and La Reforma, accused the committee's leadership of "selling out" for higher wages or political favours from the Montt government.

The more libertarian rank-and-file of the union membership refused to abide by their leadership's decision. After the leadership refused to attend popular assemblies held by rank-and-file union members, the workers marched to the committee's headquarters on 9 June, where they found the doors locked. With the position of the government having been strengthened by the strike committee's decision, many of the rail industry's workers returned to work the day after. Having claimed to have reached a settlement, the government threatened all striking public employees with dismissal and mobilised more of the military as strikebreakers. On 12 June, the rail company began firing workers who had remained on strike. Nevertheless, over 10,000 workers continued the strike, aiming to press for the complete fulfillment of the rail workers' demands. On 13 June, the FTCh declared a general strike, which brought out 15,000 more workers from various industries and encouraged other unions to press for their own demands, alongside those of the rail workers. Employers responded by dismissing entire workforces and instituting lockouts, while police arrested strike leaders and shut down union premises and publishing houses. On 15 June, the last rail workers returned to work, hoping to avoid dismissal. By 18 June, most resistance societies in Santiago had ceased strike actions, with the last holdouts ending their strikes by the end of the month.

The decentralized structure of the general strike had ultimately prevented the unions from coordinating wider actions beyond the local and industrial levels, and many of the unions' demands were not met. One trade union leader commented that the rail strike had caught Chilean workers unprepared, and that they consequently had gone into the general strike "without any preparation, idea of what they were doing, organization, strike funds, or unity of purpose". This disorganization meant that, when the railworkers' strike ended, the other unions had been unable to coordinate their continued strike actions. As workers returned to work, strike leaders were blacklisted or dismissed and unions were broken up.

== Decline and dissolution ==
Following the 1907 general strike, the Chilean organized labour movement went into a period of decline, with union strength having been substantially weakened by the blacklisting of the strike's leaders. Only three strikes took place in the latter half of 1907, all of which failed. The Panic of 1907 further strengthened employers' resolve to resist union demands, while the government violently cracked down on further industrial actions. During the suppression of a nitrate workers' strike, the forces of public order killed 4,000 people. Many of the movement's leading members, including Magno Espinoza, Luis Olea and Agustín Saavedra, also died from diseases such as tuberculosis or yellow fever. Fearing further violence and threats of dismissal, resistance societies began avoiding large gatherings and workers increasingly left their unions. By May 1908, many of the unions had been repressed and the FTCh effectively dissolved. As Chilean industry expanded and modernized, and as the influence of anarchism waned, the resistance societies declined in strength.

== Legacy ==
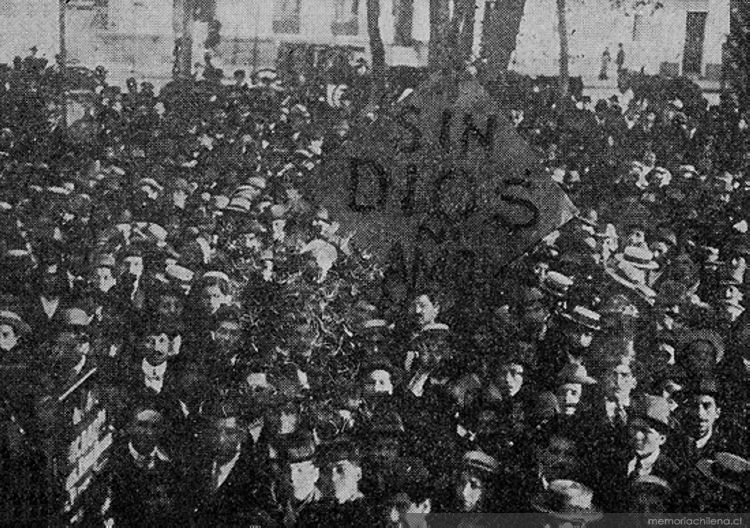
Anarchists at an International Workers' Day march in Santiago, in 1912

Many former members of the resistance societies moved back towards the more conservative mutual aid societies. In September 1909, these mutual aid societies established the Chilean Workers' Federation (Spanish: Federación Obrera de Chile; FOCh). Some anarchists became prominent members of the early FOCh, although it later fell under the influence of the Communist Party of Chile. The FOCh refused to participate in strike actions, considering them to be "antiquated". Nevertheless, strikes continued, with 29 strike actions taking place in 1909. Meanwhile, resistance societies slowly reorganized, with anarcho-syndicalists re-establishing a number of unions and leading strikes for higher wages during the early 1910s. By 1910, there were 433 resistance societies in Chile, with a combined membership of 55,000 people. The organized labor movement as a whole experienced rapid growth during this period, expanding to 90,000 union members by 1913. In October 1913, the anarcho-syndicalist resistance societies in Valparaíso established the Regional Workers' Federation of Chile (Spanish: Federación Obrera Regional de Chile; FORCh), which replicated the coordination structure of the FTCh and functioned as its de facto successor. Like the FTCh before it, the FORCh failed to become a nationwide organization. Resistance societies saw another resurgence in 1917, as construction workers, bakers and other skilled workers increasingly unionized over the subsequent years. This new unionization process culminated in 1919, with the establishment of the Industrial Workers of the World (IWW).

== Bibliography ==
- Angell, Alan (1972). "History of the Labour Movement and its Legacy". Politics and the Labour Movement in Chile. Oxford University Press. pp. 11–41. ISBN 0-19-214991-1.
- Damier, Vadim (2009) [2000]. Anarcho-syndicalism in the 20th Century. Translated by Archibald, Malcolm. Edmonton: Black Cat Press. ISBN 978-0-9737827-6-9.
- DeShazo, Peter (1983). Urban Workers and Labor Unions in Chile, 1902–1927. University of Wisconsin Press. ISBN 0299092208.
- Gambone, Larry (1996). The Libertarian Movement in Chile. Red Lion Press. OCLC 45554330.
- Loveman, Brian (1987). "Chile". In Greenfield, Gerald Michael; Maram, Sheldon L. (eds.). Latin American Labor Organizations. New York: Greenwood Press. pp. 129–178. ISBN 0-313-22834-5.
- Savala, Joshua (2018). ""Let Us Bring it with Love": Violence, Solidarity, and the Making of a Social Disaster in the Wake of the 1906 Earthquake in Valparaíso, Chile". Journal of Social History. 51 (4): 928–952. doi:10.1093/jsh/shx021.
- van der Walt, Lucien; Schmidt, Michael (2009). Black Flame: The Revolutionary Class Politics of Anarchism and Syndicalism. Edinburgh: AK Press. ISBN 978-1-904859-16-1. LCCN 2006933558. OCLC 1100238201.
