= Regional Workers' Federation of Chile =

Chilean trade union federation

- Federación Obrera Regional de Chile
- Abbreviation: FORCh
- Predecessor: Workers' Federation of Chile
- Successor: Industrial Workers of the World
- Formation: October 1913; 113 years ago
- Dissolved: 1917; 109 years ago
- Type: National trade union federation
- Headquarters: Santiago, Chile
- Members: 10,000 (1913)
- General Secretary: Juan Onofre Chamorro
- Publication: La Batalla; El Productor

The Regional Workers' Federation of Chile (Spanish: Federación Obrera Regional de Chile; FORCh) was a Chilean anarcho-syndicalist trade union federation established by resistance societies in Santiago and Valparaíso in October 1913. Soon after its formation, it led a general strike in support of a rail workers' strike, which won demands for shorter working hours and higher wages for several of its unions, although the rail workers' strike itself failed. During a subsequent economic depression, it formed tenants unions and soup kitchens to combat the rising cost of living, and led protests against fare hikes. In 1917, it was reorganized into the Industrial Workers of the World (IWW), which became the main Chilean anarcho-syndicalist organization during the early 1920s.

== Background ==
During the early 1900s, the Chilean labor movement experienced a surge in activity, as anarchists established numerous resistance societies (Spanish: Sociedades de resistencia) to bring together skilled workers in the cities of Santiago and Valparaíso. A series of successful strike actions culminated in June 1906, with the formation of the Workers' Federation of Chile (FTCh) in Santiago. In June 1907, the FTCh led a general strike in the Chilean capital, but it failed due to pervasive disorganization caused by its highly decentralized structure. The FTCh subsequently collapsed. Moderates broke away and established the Chilean Workers' Federation (FOCh) in September 1909, while anarcho-syndicalists slowly reorganized.

== Establishment ==
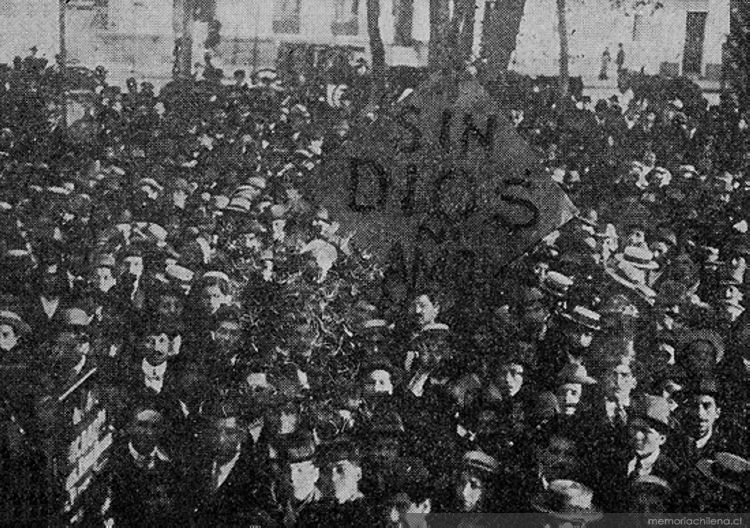
International Workers' Day demonstration in Santiago in 1912, with anarchists holding a "No Gods, No Masters" sign

In 1909, the anarcho-syndicalists began reorganizing the radical labor movement in Santiago, following the model of the ideologically-motivated resistance societies developed during the mid-1900s. Industrial action resumed, with 29 strikes taking place that year. By the following year, several trade union federations had been formed in both Santiago and Valparaíso. In 1912, the anarchist newspapers La Batalla and El Productor began publication, further contributing to the growth of the resistance societies. La Batalla became the Chilean anarchist movement's most successful newspaper, seeing a continuous print run until 1925. The anarcho-syndicalists focused on shop floor activism, campaigning against voting and joining moderate mutual aid societies to convert their members. Anarchism gained an increasingly strong influence among the workers of Santiago and Valparaíso, as union leaders preached anarchist doctrine to rank-and-file members. International Workers' Day demonstrations grew from around one hundred attendees in 1909 to tens of thousands in 1913. Union membership likewise grew rapidly, from 65,000 in 1909 to 90,000 in 1913. Strike actions also increased in frequency, particularly in the port of Valparaíso and the surrounding railways, where workers achieved wage increases after large walkouts; in many cases, resistance societies were even able to obtain wage increases without the need for strikes.

In October 1913, five resistance societies in Valparaíso established the Regional Workers' Federation of Chile (Spanish: Federación Obrera Regional de Chile; FORCh), with the aim of growing it into a national trade union federation. Within months, it grew to count twenty affiliated union sections, including construction workers', dockworkers', metalworkers', railroad workers' and shoemakers' unions. Nitrate miners in northern Chile also formed their own resistance societies, but as increased competition between companies drove up wages, the incipient labor movement there collapsed; the anarchist resistance societies and Santiago and Valparaíso would remain the center of the Chilean labor movement, with thousands of workers joining their ranks. A new generation of union leaders soon took over the anarcho-syndicalist unions, with the dockworkers' union leader Juan Onofre Chamorro being elected general secretary of the FORCh. According to Chilean historian Sergio Grez, the establishment of the FORCh constituted the beginning of anarchism as a "national force" in Chile.

== 1913 general strike ==
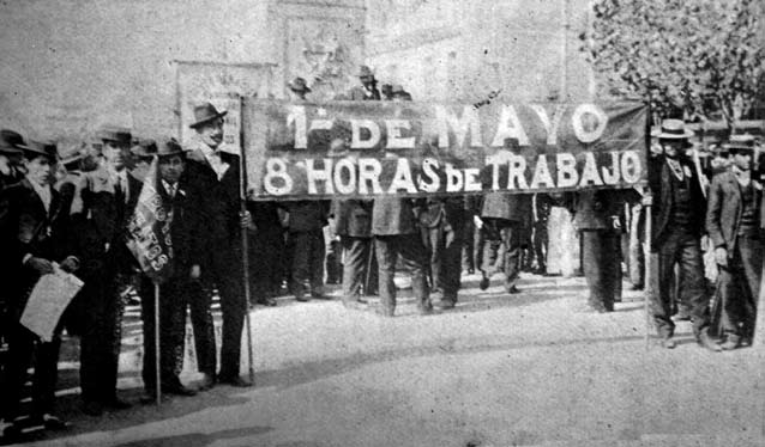
International Workers' Day demonstration by Chilean workers, demanding the eight-hour day, in 1913

Since 1912, the rising cost of living in Chile had driven a substantial rise in industrial action, with a wave of strikes sweeping the country. In April 1913, the Chilean State Railway Company had introduced a photo identification system, allegedly to prevent theft. Several rail workers, including one of their union leaders, refused to comply, fearing it would assist in blacklisting; the company responded by firing them. On 16 October, the rail workers' union led 900 rail workers out on strike, demanding dismissed workers be restated and the identification system be scrapped. Three days later, they were joined by the FORCh dockworkers' union, led by Chamorro, which made its own demands for higher wages. By 27 October, the situation had escalated into a general strike, with many of the FORCh resistance societies joining in and holding daily rallies at the Plaza O'Higgins. 10,000 workers, from more than 20 trade unions, took part in the general strike. The FORCh took over the organization of the strike, drawing up a common list of demands, including for the eight-hour day, the weekend, a minimum wage and hazard pay. In contrast, the FOCh refused to support the strike, and helped the state continue to run the railways with strikebreakers.

The government soon deployed the military to break the railway strike, and on 30 October, it began arresting strike leaders. Sailors of the FORCh were also arrested while attempting to convince the Chilean Navy to join their side. Police attempted to crack down on public demonstrations, leading to violent clashes with striking workers. The demonstrations continued despite increased police presence, and by the first week of November, rail transportation had been brought to a halt by striking rail engineers. By this time, some unions were achieving their demands, while others were folding under pressure. On 6 November, striking rail workers offered to end the strike under the condition that there be no retaliation against them, but the company insisted on dismissing them. On 8 November, striking workers at the CSAV and at the Viña del Mar sugar refinery achieved their demands for higher wages and shorter hours, and returned to work; shoemakers joined the strike the following day. The FORCh held meetings with employers, mediated by Democratic Party politician Ángel Guarello, but failed to come to an agreement. The strike began to wind down on 15 November, and by 19 November, it had ended. Although dockworkers', factory workers' and shoemakers' unions won some of their demands, the rail workers' strike failed, with the photo identification system being implemented and strike leaders being dismissed.

In contrast to the failed 1907 general strike, this one had been organized by a trade union central and every trade union involved made their own demands, rather than simply carrying out solidarity strikes. While during the 1907 strike, only the workers who started it achieved their demands, during the 1913 strike, the opposite had happened; solidarity with the state-employed rail workers dissipated after workers in the private sector had achieved their demands, which allowed the state to break the isolated rail strike without employing force. The 1913 general strike also raised pre-existing anxieties about anarchism among the Chilean upper classes, which since a series of anarchist attacks in the previous years, had grown increasingly fearful of mob violence.

== 1914–1916 depression and aftermath ==
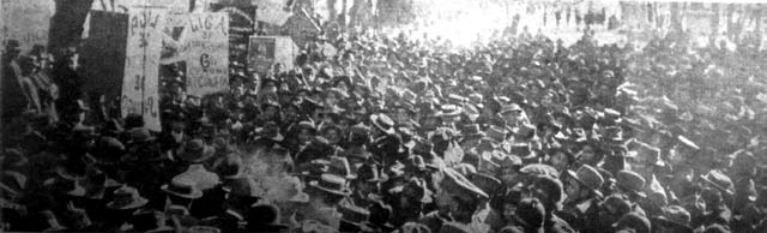
Demonstration by the Santiago tenants union in 1914

Following the outbreak of World War I, in August 1914, the Chilean economy fell into a depression, which drove up unemployment and the cost of living. Anarchists organized unemployment rallies, and established soup kitchens and tenants unions, which brought more workers into contact with the FORCh in Santiago and Valparaíso. However, the anarchist unions' bargaining position was weakened by the economic downturn and rising unemployment, resulting in a substantial decrease in strike actions during the period. Attempts by the tenants unions to secure a rent freeze failed. International Workers' Day demonstrations also diminished in size, despite being organized as joint demonstrations with other trade unions and political organizations between 1913 and 1917.

Throughout the depression, employers cut their workers' wages and the government discontinued the minimum wage for railway workers. As the value of the Chilean peso plummeted, the Valparaíso tram company responded by raising the price of fares, which provoked protests by the FORCh, the tenants unions and other left-wing organizations. On 1 December 1914, a demonstration called by the FORCh escalated into violence, with workers attacking tram company property, smashing bank windows and looting shops. Over the subsequent days, demonstrators clashed with police and continued attacking trams, forcing the company to suspend service. By 27 December, the violence had abated, and citizens accepted the fare hike.

The economy reached its lowest point in late 1915. By 1916, the economy began to recover, leading to rising employment levels, and a subsequent increase in strike actions. But the unions that had survived the depression were severely weakened, with many workers refusing to strike out of fear for their jobs. In March 1916, the FOCh led a strike by railroad workers to restore the minimum wage, but it quickly collapsed; the government again brought in the military to run the railways and break the strike, and this time, there were no solidarity strikes to accompany it. In contrast, the anarchist Shoemakers' Federation was able to lead a number of successful strike actions in 1917 and 1918. The Russian Revolution of 1917 subsequently caused the anarchists and socialists to split into mutually exclusive camps. In 1917, Chamorro led a dockworkers' strike and subsequently oversaw the reorganization of the FORCh into the Industrial Workers of the World (IWW), which many anarcho-syndicalists joined during the early 1920s. Like the FTCh before it, the FORCh failed to become a nationwide organization. But a number of its leaders would rise to national prominence, as leaders of the labor movement and left-wing politics.

== Bibliography ==
- Angell, Alan (1972). "History of the Labour Movement and its Legacy". Politics and the Labour Movement in Chile. Oxford: Oxford University Press. pp. 11–41. ISBN 0-19-214991-1.
- DeShazo, Peter (1983). Urban Workers and Labor Unions in Chile, 1902–1927. Madison: University of Wisconsin Press. ISBN 0299092208.
- Gambone, Larry (1996). The Libertarian Movement in Chile. Montreal: Red Lion Press. OCLC 45554330.
- Lamb, James G. (2021). The Labor Plan: Labor, the State and the Labor Code in Chile (1973-2018) (PhD). Berkeley: University of California, Berkeley. ProQuest 28652536.
- Loveman, Brian (1987). "Chile". In Greenfield, Gerald Michael; Maram, Sheldon L. (eds.). Latin American Labor Organizations. New York: Greenwood Press. pp. 129–178. ISBN 0-313-22834-5.
- Roddick, Jackie (1981). "The Failure of Populism in Chile: Labour movement and Politics Before World War II". Boletín de Estudios Latinoamericanos y Del Caribe (31): 61–89. ISSN 0304-2634. JSTOR 25675112.
- van der Walt, Lucien; Schmidt, Michael (2009). Black Flame: The Revolutionary Class Politics of Anarchism and Syndicalism. Edinburgh: AK Press. ISBN 978-1-904859-16-1. LCCN 2006933558. OCLC 1100238201.
