= Industrial Workers of the World (Chile) =

Chilean trade union center

- Trabajadores Industriales del Mundo
- Logo of the IWW
- Abbreviation: IWW-C
- Successor: General Confederation of Workers
- Established: December 1919; 106 years ago
- Dissolved: 1927; 99 years ago
- Type: National trade union center
- Purpose: Industrial unionism
- Headquarters: Valparaíso
- Location: Chile
- Members: 40,000 (1923)
- Secretary General: Juan Chamorro
- Publication: Acción Directa
- Parent organization: Industrial Workers of the World
- Affiliations: International Workers' Association

The Industrial Workers of the World (Chile) (IWW-C), also known as the Chilean IWW or Chilean Wobblies, was a Chilean trade union center. Established in the late 1910s by dockworkers in Valparaíso, the tenets of industrial unionism were quickly adopted by maritime workers throughout the country. The IWW organised strike actions to demand of the eight-hour day and the implementation of workplace safety standards. Before long, its membership spread to industrial workers in Santiago, gaining particular strength among construction workers.

The Chilean government was alarmed by the rise of the IWW, which it believed to be a front for foreign agitators and violent terrorists, despite the organization being led by Chilean nationals and being staunchly nonviolent. In July 1920, the state launched a massive crackdown against the organisation, arresting hundreds of people on charges of sedition, without any substantial evidence. The arrested workers were crammed into overcrowded prisons, where disease spread quickly and abuse was rife. The death of the poet José Domingo Gómez Rojas in prison caused a public outcry, which by December 1920, led to the release of every arrested worker without charge.

The union quickly returned to organizing, affiliating itself with the International Workers' Association (IWA) and forming links with maritime workers throughout South America. By the late 1920s, the IWW was eclipsed by left-wing political parties, which had gained dominance within trade unions in the country. In 1927, the dictatorship of Carlos Ibáñez del Campo dissolved the IWW and deported its leadership. After the fall of the Ibáñez dictatorship, Chilean anarcho-syndicalists reorganised into the General Confederation of Workers (CGT), which abandoned the old model of industrial unionism in favor of a federalist organisation.

== Background ==
Since the establishment of Chile as an independent nation state in the early 19th century, the country has maintained over 4,000 kilometers of coastline. Of its 59 ports, by 1848, the port city of Valparaíso became its most important, as the center of vast amounts of imports and exports, linking it with port cities in Europe, Asia and North America. During the late 19th century, Valparaíso also became a center for the circulation of radical new ideas, with the city's dockworkers and sailors being attracted towards anarcho-syndicalism.

From the beginning of the organized labor movement in Chile, anarchism found the most widespread acceptance among workers. During the 1870s, anarchists established a branch of the International Workingmen's Association (IWMA) in Chile, where it distributed propaganda within existing benefit societies and left-wing publications. Anarchist principles of direct action, autonomy and federalism were soon taken up by the Chilean labor movement. The main divergence in the anarcho-syndicalist movement was over whether to accept the programme of the Industrial Workers of the World (IWW), a North American labor union which some Latin American anarchists criticised for centralisation. In Chile, local anarcho-syndicalists patterned their own organizations after the model of the IWW.

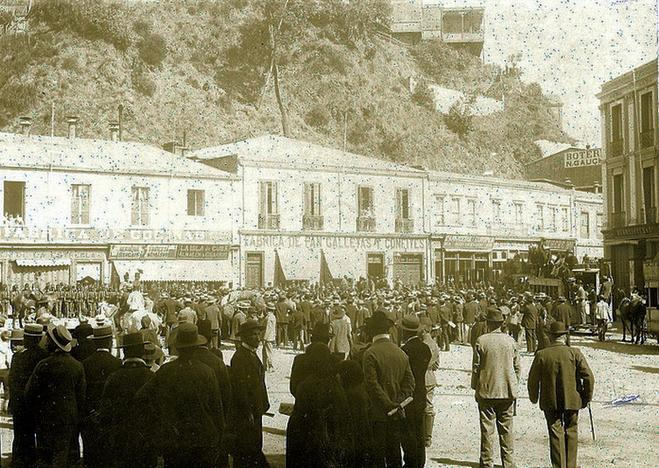
Demonstration during the 1903 Valparaíso dockworkers' strike

By the turn of the 20th century, the anarchist movement had gained a substantial following in Chile, as anarcho-syndicalists organised a number of trade unions and led a series of strike actions in the country. Anarchist trade unions were established in Santiago and Valparaíso, where they organised bakers, carpenters, dockworkers, printers and shoemakers; they also organised coalminers in the northern regions and in Biobío. Anarchists participated in the 1903 Valparaíso dockworkers' strike and the 1905 Santiago meat riots, which they believed to have failed due to the lack of a general strike to support it.

In 1906, anarchist trade unions unified into the Workers' Federation of Chile (Spanish: Federación de Trabajadores de Chile; FTCH), which became the main force in the country's labor movement. The following year, during an anarchist-led strike of 30,000 nitrate workers, the Chilean Army killed 4,000 people in the repression of the strike. In response, the anarchist Antonio Ramón attempted to assassinate Roberto Silva Renard, the military commander responsible for the massacre. The FTCH was subsequently reorganised into the Federation of Chilean Workers (Spanish: Federacion de Obreros de Chile; FOCH), which gained a substantial influence in the Chilean labor movement, although it failed to grow into a truly nationwide organization. Anarchists grew increasingly critical of the FOCh after it came under the control of the Communist Party of Chile (CPC) and affiliated with the Red International of Labour Unions (RILU), which they argued to have caused division within the labor movement.

== Establishment ==
During the 1910s, dockworkers and sailors based in the port of Valparaíso began forming their own trade unions and organising strike actions, demanding the eight-hour day, a limit on overtime and a reduction in the cargo weight limit from 105 to 92 kilograms. During this period, dockworkers and sailors also made contact with other maritime workers from across the Pacific, with contacts extending as far north as San Francisco. As Chilean maritime workers increasingly gravitated towards anarcho-syndicalism, in 1917, the Industrial Workers of the World (IWW) established itself in the port of Valparaíso. The IWW soon organised a series of strike actions against the rising cost of living and food shortages in Chile. Following mobilizations by the National Food Workers' Assembly (AOAN) in 1918, stevedores affiliated with the IWW refused to load foodstuffs onto ships for export. Following the negotiated end to the strike in September 1919, the AOAN lost a substantial number of its more militant members, many of whom joined the IWW.

Over the following year, the IWW gained a significant influence among Chilean dockworkers and sailors. Its industrial union of Maritime Transport Workers (MTW) came to dominate the port of Valparaíso, and was also particularly strong in the ports of Iquique and Antofagasta. Although its largest base was among maritime workers in port cities, the IWW also established industrial unions in the capital of Santiago; they organised construction workers, shoemakers, bakers, printers, munition workers, and workers of various other trades. The Santiago construction workers' union became the second largest industrial union in Chile, after the Valparaíso maritime workers' union. Although some unions were skeptical of the IWW's more centralised organisational structure and preferred to maintain their autonomy, they still considered the IWW to be a "natural ally". The IWW received a considerable amount of support from schoolteachers' and students' unions.

By 1919, itinerant workers had expanded the reach of the IWW throughout Chile. A Chilean branch of the Industrial Workers of the World (IWW-C) was established, becoming the first national trade union center in Chile. At the first congress of the IWW-C, held in December 1919, it adopted syndicalist tactics including strike actions, boycotts and sabotage. The IWW-C proclaimed itself to be a revolutionary organization, which would oppose capitalism, the state and the clergy. The IWW's primary aim was the abolition of wage labor, which it aimed to accomplish through "revolutionary syndicalism in the street, the workshop, and the family". It intended to establish "One Big Union", which would include all Chilean workers, and which would aim to establish workers' control of the means of production. It had no paid official positions, except for that of the secretary general, who called meetings of the executive committee.

Founded with 200 members, it soon grew to count 9,000 members; by 1920, it counted 25,000 members. In 1921, Chilean anarcho-syndicalists left the FOCH and merged into the IWW-C. Despite the ideological and organisational overlap, many members of the IWW-C were not anarchists and many Chilean anarchists were not members of the IWW-C. Although influenced by anarcho-syndicalism, the IWW-C never claimed to be an anarchist organization, arguing instead that industrial unionism constituted an update of syndicalism that avoided both the disorganization of anarchism and the bureaucracy of authoritarian socialism.

== Reaction to growing influence ==
In the years following the establishment of the IWW-C, a number of unions and federations were established in various industries throughout Chile, while existing unions saw a substantial growth in membership. The Chilean government first became aware of the IWW-C in 1919, after it held a political demonstration in Santiago. By this time, the Australian government had ordered the deportation of numerous IWW members, of various different nationalities, to Valparaíso. One of the deportees was the Australian IWW leader Tom Barker. This caused a diplomatic incident with the Chilean government, which passed a Residency Law that prohibited "undesirable elements" from enetering the country. For years afterwards, the Chilean government continued to suspect that other states were intentionally deporting radicals to their country. Officials of the United States consulate in Valparaíso disagreed over the role that foreign workers played in the rise of the IWW-C: according to some, "foreign agitators" of the IWW gained a strong influence over Chilean coal miners, nitrate workers and dockworkers; others thought that Chilean officials concerned with the IWW had "deceive[d] themselves into believing that the trouble [was] imported from abroad by foreigners". Despite preoccupations with the presence of "foreign agitators" in the IWW, the union was largely led by Chilean nationals.

The antimilitarism of the IWW had alarmed the government of Juan Luis Sanfuentes, which increasingly received police reports of the IWW violently denouncing the Chilean Armed Forces, encouraging draft evasion and campaigning for the abolition of conscription. As a sustained wave of successful strike actions, union organising and antimilitarist agitation strengthened the power of the labor movement, the IWW became a target for political repression and its members were denounced by officials as "bomb-throwers and nihilists". Despite this portrayal of their members as violent terrorists, the IWW and other anarcho-syndicalist organisations opposed the use of violence and repeatedly rejected the association of direct action with violence.

When the conservative senator Carlos Aldunate Solar acquired a copy of Paul Brissenden's study of the IWW, he fixated on the US government's charges of subversion and treason against the IWW, as well as its attempts to deport "foreign agitators" among the IWW leadership. In the Senate of Chile, Brissenden's book (itself a defense of the IWW) was presented as evidence in a proposal for the political repression of the IWW-C. In April 1920, the Chilean government began to investigate the influence of the IWW in the Chilean labor movement, and by the winter of that year, it moved to proscribe it as a subversive organisation.

== Process of the subversives ==
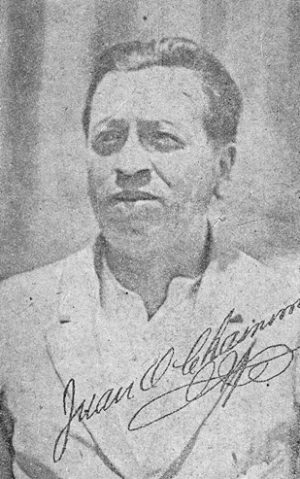
Juan Onofre Chamorro, leader of the IWW dockworkers' union

In July 1920, the Chilean state initiated its campaign of political repression against the IWW. On 19 July, the printer Julio Valiente was arrested, charged with having published the statutes of the IWW; he admitted to having printed 3,000 copies for the union, although he denied having any affiliation to it. The police detained him indefinitely, under suspicion of carrying out subversive activities for the IWW. The following evening, police arrested the founder of the IWW's Valparaíso branch, the dockworkers' union leader Juan Onofre Chamorro. On 21 July, they raided the IWW social center in Valparaíso, during which they beat and arrested 175 workers. After clearing the hall, the police planted false evidence of explosives, guns and ammunition in the hall. The Chilean government swiftly appointed José Astorquiza Líbano as special prosecutor and granted him broad powers to investigate the case. Supplied with police reports and copies of IWW publications, Astorquiza ordered the arrest of all known IWW members in Santiago.

On the morning of Sunday, 25 July 1920, five Chilean police agents broke into the Santiago offices of the IWW in order to gather evidence of subversive activities. Although they hoped to find weapons, their haul consisted solely of photos of famous anarchists, editions of various syndicalist publications, copies of manifestoes and other archival documents. Meanwhile, other police agents began their round up of suspected IWW members, including carpenters, shoemakers, drivers and students. Verba Roja editor Armando Triviño said he could "smell" the coming repression and fled the city to a safe house in Valparaíso; in his absence, his wife and co-editor were arrested. During the repression, some IWW-C members hid out at the home of Casimiro Barrios Fernández. The police never found the large cache of weapons they assumed the IWW had; only three pistols and a single rifle, each possessed by individuals, were found during the entire wave of mass arrests. In the homes of most IWW members, including that of the poet José Domingo Gómez Rojas, the police found little to no evidence of subversive activities, mostly discovering books, magazines or fundraising leaflets.

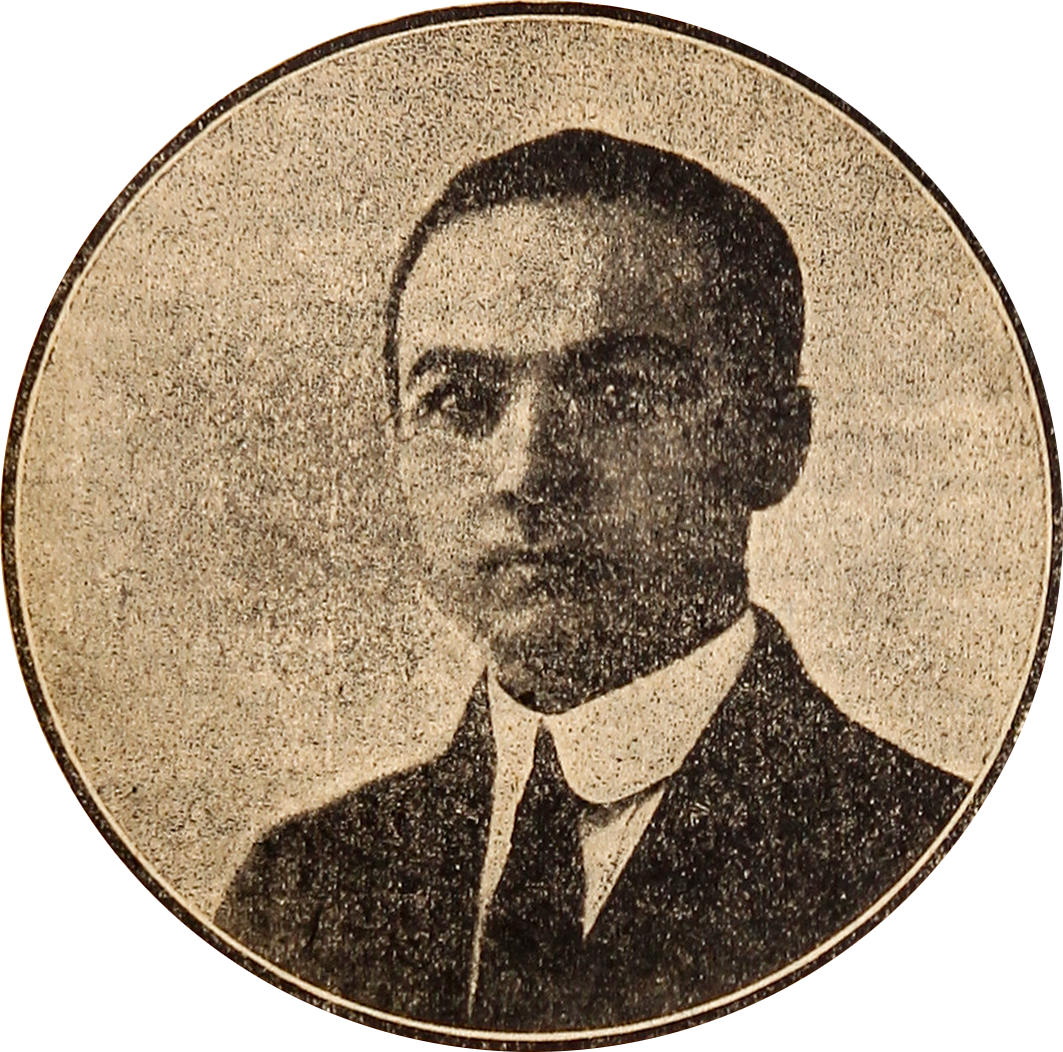
Student activist Juan Gandulfo, who established the IWW medical clinic in Valparaíso

Astorquiza subsequently turned to identifying the source of these various publications; he suspected the University of Chile Student Federation (FECh) of publishing and distributing the IWW's programs. Two leading members of the FECh, Santiago Labarca and Juan Gandulfo, were known to have links to the IWW and went into hiding to avoid arrest. Based on hearsay that the FECh and IWW were complicit in a student's death, Astorquiza ordered the arrest of all leading members of the FECh. As arrests of FECh members and raids against their premises began, the FECh issued a manifesto opposing the state's attacks against "freedom of thought" and declared a strike. The IWW-C, which supported the student movement, called a 48-hour general strike in solidarity with the FECh. From 25 to 27 July, striking students and workers clashed with the police in Santiago. Men and women were arrested for throwing stones at police, impeding traffic and even waving the red flag. People called for the fall of the Sanfuentes government, some proclaimed their support for the liberal presidential candidate Arturo Alessandri, and others were arrested for making pronouncements against the army and police. The Chilean public widely saw the events as a state attack against freedom of speech.

During the events that became known as the "process of the subversives" (Spanish: proceso de los subversivos), hundreds of men were arrested on suspicion of membership in the IWW; in contrast, only 3 women were arrested, including María Astorga Navarro and Carmen Serrano. The gender imbalance in the detentions was due in part to the fact that members of the IWW-C were largely male, many of whom saw women as "wives and mothers" rather than as fellow workers, but also due to the institutional sexism of the Chilean authorities.

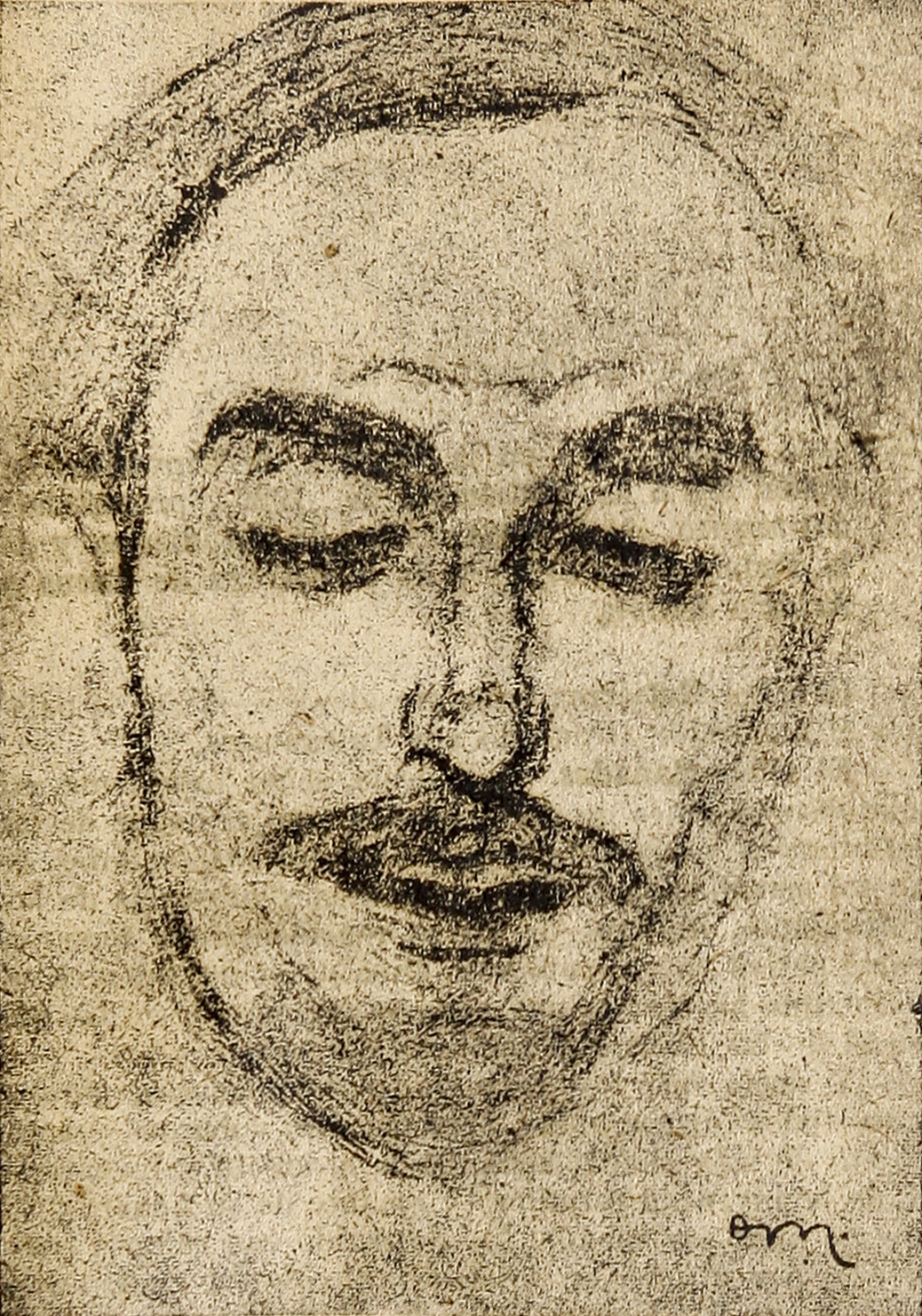
Illustration of José Domingo Gómez Rojas, following his death in September 1920

So many people were arrested during the process that the jails of Santiago became overcrowded, a situation exacerbated by Astorquiza spending so much time seeking evidence of subversive activities. Astorquiza considered even the most minor evidence, from possession of copies of left-wing papers to claims of people holding meetings, to be proof of subversive activities. He also ordered investigators to look into whether arrested people were involved in strikes. In order to cope with the overcrowding, the state transferred many detainees to prisons. By the middle of August 1920, Astorquiza was being forced to defend the mass arrests. Other state officials resigned after people, including the IWW poet Gómez Rojas, were discovered to have been imprisoned without charge. Imprisoned workers lived in extremely poor conditions: bad quality food; the spread of epidemic typhus and tuberculosis; and widespread sexual assault. The poor conditions, combined with solitary confinement and persistent abuse from the prison guards, caused the poet José Domingo Gómez Rojas to fall gravely ill. On 29 September 1920, he died in prison from his illness. Members of the IWW-C clandestinely attended his funeral, while others that were imprisoned sent flowers to decorate his coffin or raised funds to aid his bereaved family.

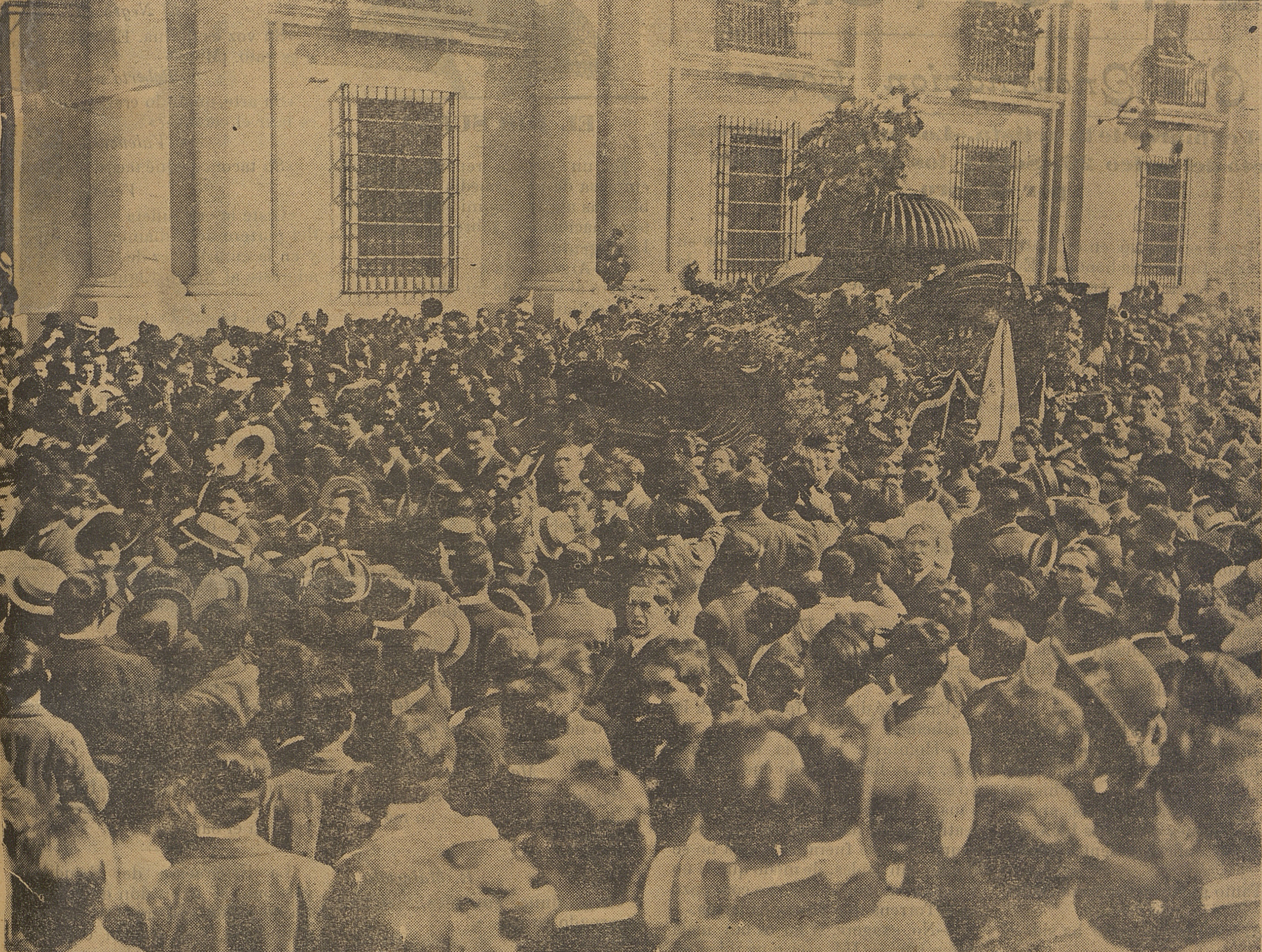
Funeral of José Domingo Gómez Rojas, in October 1920

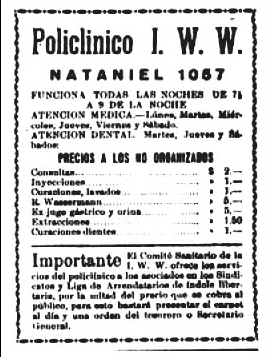
Advertisement of the IWW polyclinic

The death of Gómez Rojas radicalized public opinion against the authorities. Astorquiza, the prison guards and police were widely blamed for the death, with students and the press increasingly protesting against the continued imprisonment of "innocent victims" of the process. By December 1920, all of the detainees that had been accused of sedition and illicit association were released from prison. The liberal opposition candidate Arturo Alessandri, who had won the 1920 Chilean presidential election, prepared to take office and was keen to put the process to an end. Despite the sustained repression, members of the IWW-C immediately returned to organizing after they were released from prison. In 1923, the anarchist surgeon Juan Gandulfo established an IWW medical clinic in Valparaíso, known as the Policlínica Obrera, which survived until the 1950s. After Gandulfo's death in 1931, his brother Pedro, a dentist, took over management of the clinic.

== International relations ==
The IWW-C endorsed the founding congress of the International Workers' Association (IWA), which took place in Berlin in December 1922, but its delegate Montaca didn't arrive until after the congress had concluded. In 1923, the IWW-C confirmed its affiliation to the International Workers' Association (IWA). At the time of its affiliation to the IWA, the IWW-C counted 40,000 members.

From 1922, the IWW-C sought to establish links with anarcho-syndicalists in Peru, where Luis Armando Triviño propagated the organizational form and methods of the IWW and called for international solidarity between Peruvian and Chilean workers. Although efforts were unsuccessful in the capital Lima, workers in Arequipa and particularly dockworkers in Mollendo were receptive to the IWW-C and developed direct contacts with them. Over the years, close ties were formed between dockworkers in Chile and Mollendo; members of the IWW-C held secret meetings with Peruvian workers and expressed solidarity with them during strike actions, leading to the establishment of a local IWW section in Mollendo by March 1925. The Peruvian government was alarmed by the rise of the proletarian internationalism and responded by attempting to stir up nationalist sentiments against Chileans. On 4 May 1925, Senator Augusto Bedoya Suárez blamed the rise of Peruvian trade unionism on foreign sources and called for the "extermination" of the Chilean trade unionists. The same day, IWW-C leaders such as Octavio Manrique were deported, and several other members fled to Chile. By 1927, repressive measures in Peru and Chile had resulted in workers in both countries severing ties, although the IWW maintained an influence in Peru into the 1930s.

Maritime workers affiliated with the IWW-C also formed international links with anarchist maritime workers from throughout the Americas. In March 1926, the Chilean IWW member Alberto Bengoa, who represented the local MTW section, presided over the Second International Congress of the Maritime Transport Workers of the Western Hemisphere, held in the Uruguayan capital of Montevideo. At the congress, tensions were noted between the anarchist and communist delegates; communist delegates were forced to make concessions to the anarchists in order to keep all resolutions apolitical. The congress ultimately agreed on a declaration which demanded the eight-hour day, weekend and overtime pay for sailors, as well as a number of other improvements to the working conditions for crews.

== Repression and reorganisation ==
The IWW managed to survive through the early 1920s, but the rise of the Communist Party of Chile (PCC) and the Socialist Party of Chile (PSC) led to a decline in the union's activity. As the state increasingly intervened in labor disputes, often on behalf of the workers, workers sought collaboration with the government and anarcho-syndicalism lost favor within the Chilean labor movement. By the end of the 1920s, anarcho-syndicalists were no longer the predominant force in the Latin American labor movement, much of which had come under the control of political parties.

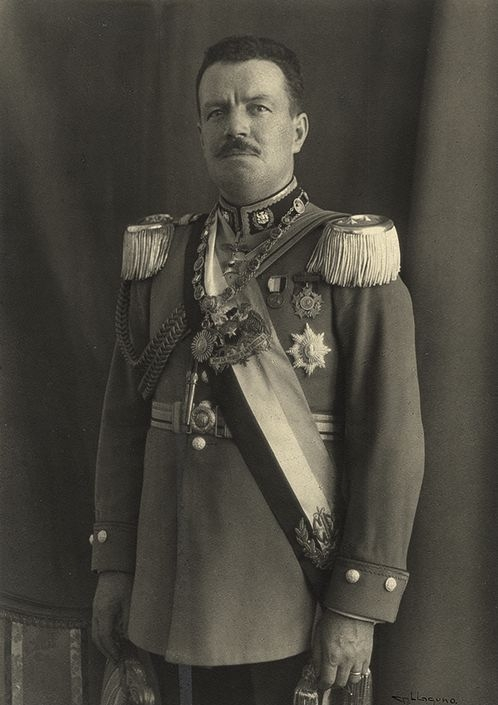
Carlos Ibáñez del Campo, whose dictatorship oversaw the breaking up of the IWW

In 1925, the IWW-C experienced a split and many of its strongest unions left to form the Chilean Regional Workers' Federation (FORCH). In 1927, following the installation of a dictatorship under Carlos Ibáñez del Campo, the IWW-C was broken up, as it had been strongest opponent of the government's labor code. The leaders of the IWW-C were deported to Más Afuera and the Aysén Region.

In previous decades, the Argentine Regional Workers' Federation (FORA) had attempted to hold a continental congress of anarcho-syndicalist trade union centers; the Chilean federation accepted the invitation, but no congress was successfully held until the 1920s. In May 1929, Latin American members of the IWA established the Continental American Workers Association (Spanish: Asociación Continental Americana de Trabajadores; ACAT). In its constitution, the ACAT excluded the IWW from participation, criticising the North American union for having a "top-down" approach to proletarian internationalism.

Following the deposition of Ibáñez in 1931, Chilean anarcho-syndicalists reorganised themselves. They established the General Confederation of Workers (Spanish: Confederación General de Trabajadores; CGT), which was active in the country throughout the 1930s. The CGT abandoned the old organisational model of the IWW, instead taking up the regional federation model of the FORA. By the 1950s, the Chilean CGT had dissolved into the Central Única de Trabajadores de Chile. In 1938, the Chilean IWW was briefly revived; in 1944, it organized a number of public meetings in Santiago and invited people of various different ideologies to speak.

== Bibliography ==
- Alexander, Robert J.; Parker, Eldon (2009). "Anarcho-Syndicalist Unions and ACAT". International Labor Organizations and Organized Labor in Latin America and the Caribbean. Bloomsbury Publishing. pp. 1–10. ISBN 9780313381836.
- Angell, Alan (1972). "History of the Labour Movement and its Legacy". Politics and the Labour Movement in Chile. Oxford University Press. pp. 11–41. ISBN 0-19-214991-1.
- Cole, Peter; van der Walt, Lucien (2011). "Crossing the Color Lines, Crossing the Continents: Comparing the Racial Politics of the IWW in South Africa and the United States, 1905–1925". Safundi: The Journal of South African and American Studies. 12 (1): 69–96. doi:10.1080/17533171.2011.533914.
- Craib, Raymond (2016). The Cry of the Renegade: Politics and Poetry in Interwar Chile. Oxford University Press. ISBN 9780190241353.
- Craib, Raymond (2023). "Lxs anarquistas". Latin American Research Review. 58 (3): 717–729. doi:10.1017/lar.2023.27.
- Damier, Vadim (2009) [2000]. Anarcho-syndicalism in the 20th Century. Translated by Archibald, Malcolm. Edmonton: Black Cat Press. ISBN 978-0-9737827-6-9.
- DeShazo, Peter (1983). Urban Workers and Labor Unions in Chile, 1902–1927. University of Wisconsin Press. ISBN 0299092208.
- Hirsch, Steven J. (2010). "Peruvian Anarcho-Syndicalism: Adapting Transnational Influences and Forging Counterhegemonic Practices, 1905–1930". In Hirsch, Steven J.; van der Walt, Lucien (eds.). Anarchism and Syndicalism in the Colonial and Postcolonial World, 1870–1940. Studies in Global Social History. Vol. 6. Leiden: Brill. pp. 227–272. ISBN 9789004188495. OCLC 868808983.
- MacPherson, Robert (2017). "Antisystemic Movement Analysis: Tracing the World-Scale Determinants of Syndicalism". Social Problems. 65 (4): 491–515. doi:10.1093/socpro/spw043.
- Poblete Troncoso, Moisés; Burnett, Ben G. (1960). "The Rise of Organized Labor in South America: Argentina and Chile". Rise of the Latin American Labor Movement. New Haben: College & University Press. pp. 42–68. OCLC 232849.
- Rosenthal, Anton (2017). "Moving between the Global and the Local: The Industrial Workers of the World and their Press in Latin America". In de Laforcade, Geoffroy; Shaffer, Kirwin R. Shaffer (eds.). In Defiance of Boundaries: Anarchism in Latin American History. University Press of Florida. pp. 72–94. ISBN 978-0-8130-6110-8.
- Sánchez, Nicolás Fuster; Moscoso Flores, Pedro (2017). "The "in-between" of sexual differentiation and the division of labor: The medical health record program of the IWW in Chile. 1924-1927". In Gallo, Oscar; Castaño, Eugenio (eds.). Occupational health in the 20th and 21st centuries. Translated by Gómez, Ricardo; Londoño, Jimena. Escuela Nacional Sindical. pp. 101–139. ISBN 978-958-8207-74-2.
- Simon, S. Fanny (1946). "Anarchism and Anarcho-Syndicalism in South America". The Hispanic American Historical Review. 26 (1). Duke University Press: 38–59. doi:10.2307/2507692. ISSN 1527-1900. JSTOR 2507692.
- Thorpe, Wayne (1989). The Workers Themselves. Kluwer Academic Publishers. ISBN 0-7923-0276-1. LCCN 89-8205.
- van der Walt, Lucien; Schmidt, Michael (2009). Black Flame: The Revolutionary Class Politics of Anarchism and Syndicalism. Edinburgh: AK Press. ISBN 978-1-904859-16-1. LCCN 2006933558. OCLC 1100238201.
- Weiss, Holger (2021). "Establishing a Global Network". A Global Radical Waterfront. Brill. pp. 57–134. doi:10.1163/9789004463288_005. ISBN 978-90-04-46291-5.
