= FORCh =

FORCh may refer to:

- Regional Workers' Federation of Chile (Federación Obrera Regional de Chile), a trade union federation formed in 1913
- Chilean Regional Workers' Federation (Federación Obrera Regional Chilena), a trade union federation formed in 1926

== See also ==
- Forch, a village and a mountain pass in the canton of Zürich, Switzerland
