= Talcahuano =

City in Chile

- City, Port and Commune
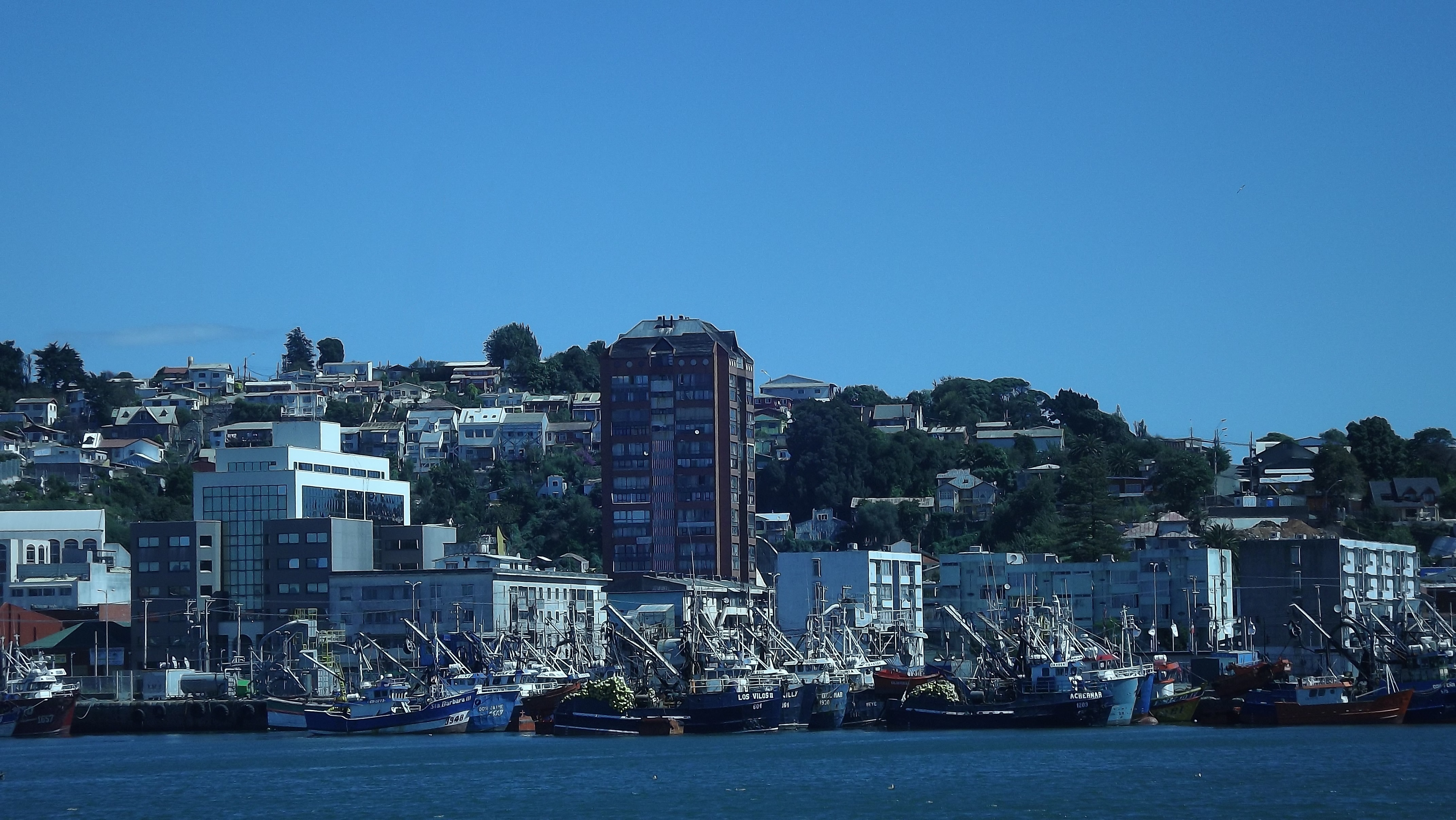

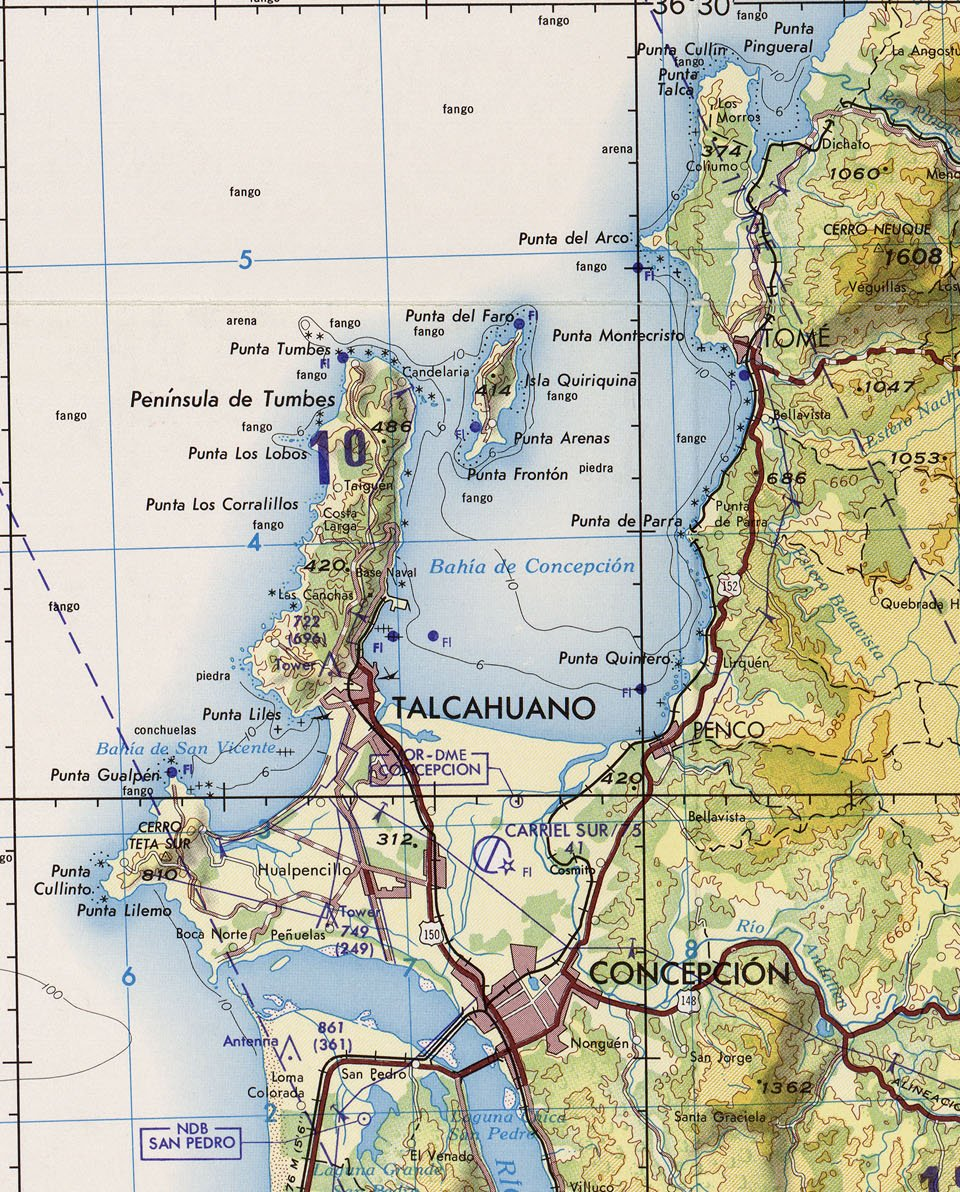
- Coat of arms Map of Talcahuano in Biobío Region Location in Chile
- Coordinates (city): 36°43′0″S 73°07′19″W
- Country: Chile
- Region: Biobío
- Province: Concepción
- Founded: 1764

Government
  - Type: Municipality
  - Alcalde: Gastón Saavedra Chandía (Ind.)

Area
  - City, Port and Commune: 92.3 km^{2} (35.6 sq mi)
- Elevation: 1 m (3.3 ft)

Population (2012 Census)
  - City, Port and Commune: 150,499
  - Density: 1,630/km^{2} (4,220/sq mi)
  - Metro: 250,348
  - Urban: 248,964
  - Rural: 1,384
- Demonym: Talcahuian

Sex
  - Men: 121,778
  - Women: 128,570
- Time zone: UTC−4 (CLT)
  - Summer (DST): UTC−3 (CLST)
- Area code: 56 + 41
- Website: www.talcahuano.cl (in Spanish)

Talcahuano (Spanish pronunciation: [talkaˈ(ɣ)wano]) (From Mapudungun Tralkawenu, "Thundering Sky") is a port city and commune in the Biobío Region of Chile. It is part of the Greater Concepción conurbation. Talcahuano is located in the south of the Central Zone of Chile.

== Geography ==
Together with ten other municipalities, it forms part of the Concepción Province, which in turn is one of four provinces that forms the VIII Region of Biobío Region.

== Demographics ==
According to the 2002 census of the National Statistics Institute, Talcahuano spans an area of 145.8 km^{2} (56 sq mi) and has 250,348 inhabitants (121,778 men and 128,570 women). Of these, 248,964 (99.4%) lived in urban areas and 1,384 (0.6%) in rural areas. The population grew by 59.9% (93,766 persons) between the 1992 and 2002 censuses. With a population density of 1,873 inhabitants per square kilometre, it is the seventh most populated city of the country.

== History ==
The official foundation date of Talcahuano is 5 November 1764 when Antonio de Guill y Gonzaga declared it an official port. However, the site of Talcahuano began to appear in history books as early as 1544 when Genoese captain Juan Bautista Pastene discovered the mouth of the Biobío river while exploring the coast in his ships San Pedro and Santiaguillo. In 1601 Alonso de Ribera built Fort Talcahueno to defend remaining Spanish settlements near Concepción.

The city is named after an Araucanian chief, Talcahueñu, who inhabited the region at the arrival of the Spanish. In Mapudungun, the language of the indigenous Mapuches, Talcahuano means "Thundering Sky".

The port was well known to American whaleships of the 19th century. They often put in for fresh water, food, and various forms of entertainment for the crews.

On 24 January 1939 at around 23.33 the city was hit by a major earthquake of 8.3 which had an epicenter close to the city of Chillán. The Chilean Government requested from the British Government the help of two British cruisers HMS Ajax (22) and HMS Exeter (68) then visiting the city of Valparaíso to head south to investigate. The ships arrived at Talcahuano on 25th, many of the city's main buildings had been destroyed with little power, food or water available to the survivors. The two ships crews helped with rubble clearing, rescuing those still trapped, recovering bodies as well as the ships taking trips north to Valparaiso with those injured and refugees.

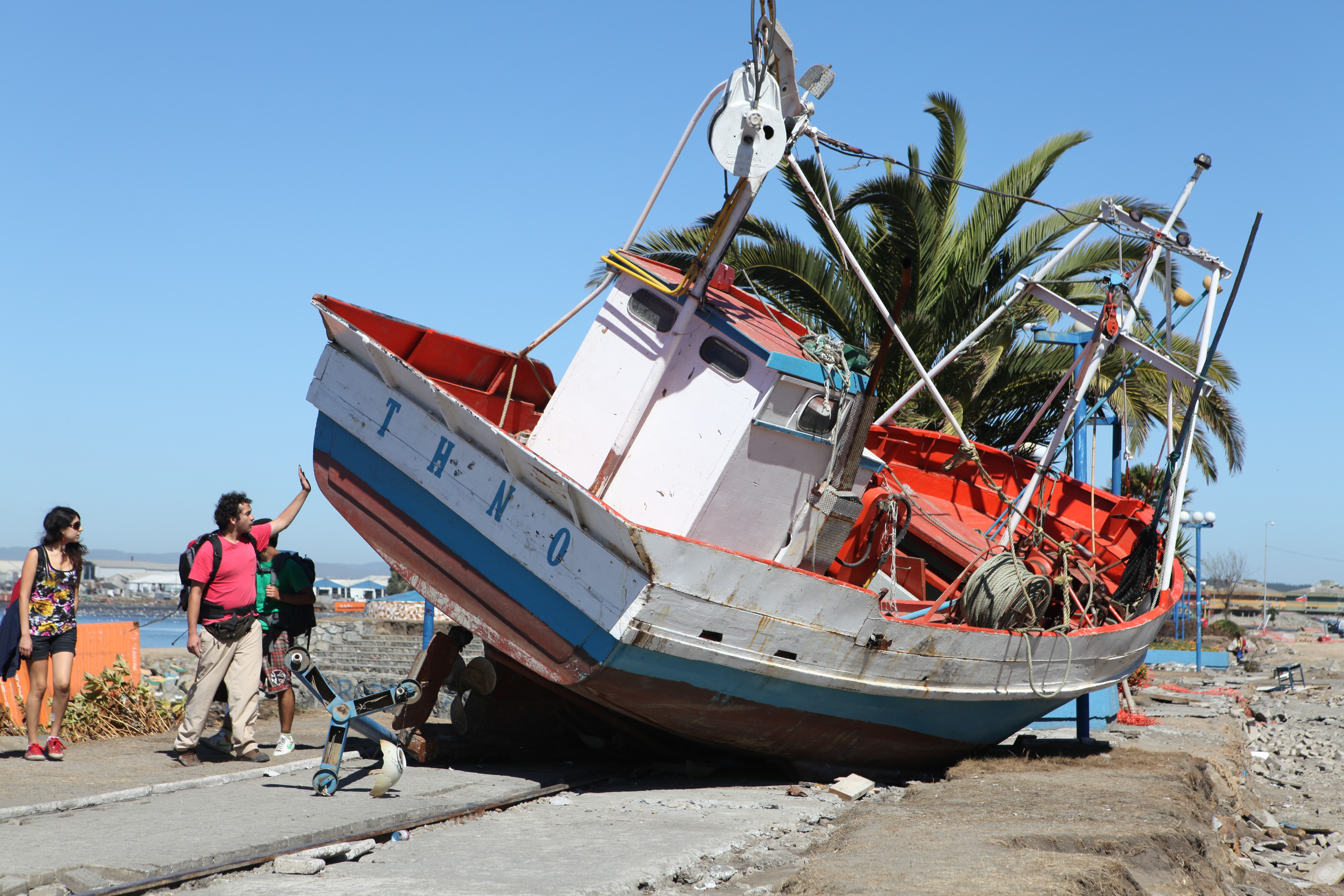
The 2010 tsunami carried this fishing boat ashore.

=== 27 February 2010 earthquake ===
On 27 February 2010 Talcahuano was devastated by the 8.8 magnitude 2010 Chile earthquake and its subsequent tsunami. These back-to-back disasters left 80% of the city's residents homeless. The tsunami is estimated to have been more than 7.5 feet high. After a week, there are only 20 reported deaths, and 18 missing. The city government estimates that it will take 10 years to recover from the quake and tsunami. The local government has been turning away tent aid, as they want to make permanent shelters rather than have permanent tent camps.

== Economy ==
Talcahuano's economy is built around tourism, marine gastronomy, the nautical qualities of the bay, industry, trade in services, products and its logistics platform. It is home to Chile's main naval base which houses the historic Huáscar, a Peruvian ironclad ship (British-made) captured in 1879 during the War of the Pacific. It is also the base of the Chilean submarine fleet and the ASMAR shipyard.

== Administration ==
As a commune, Talcahuano is a third-level administrative division of Chile administered by a municipal council, headed by an alcalde who is directly elected every four years. The 2016 - 2020 alcalde is Henry Campos Coa (UDI).

The commune of Talcahuano has seventeen districts, the three most populous being Carriel, San Vicente and San Miguel, which together account for about 46% of the population of the commune. Only two of the districts contain any rural population: Tumbes with 5% rural and Carrie with ½%.

- El Portón
- Valdivieso
- Cerro Fuentes
- La Aduana
- Cerro Buenavista
- Tumbes
- Isla Quiriquina
- San Vicente
- Estadio
- Huachipato
- Estadio Higueras
- San Miguel
- El Arenal
- Carriel
- Las Salinas
- Barranquilla
- Zunico

Within the electoral divisions of Chile, Talcahuano is represented in the Chamber of Deputies by Sergio Bobadilla, Félix González, Francesca Muñoz, José Miguel Ortiz, Leonidas Romero, Gastón Saavedra, Jaime Tohá and Enrique van Rysselberghe as part of the 20th electoral district. The commune is represented in the Senate by Alejandro Navarro Brain (MAS) and Jacqueline Van Rysselberghe Herrera (UDI) as part of the 12th senatorial constituency (Biobío-Cordillera).

== Culture ==
=== Sports ===
Talcahuano entered football history when Ramón Unzaga Asla, a player for the local club Estrella del Mar, invented the famous bicycle kick (also known as "chilena") there in 1914. The city is home to Club Deportivo Huachipato, a football club in Chile's Primera División, playing at Estadio CAP.

The city is also the birthplace of Sammis Reyes, a former Chilean men's national basketball player who converted to American football. In 2021 he became the first Chilean to play in the National Football League, an American football league based in the United States.

== In literature ==
It featured prominently in Miles Smeeton's book Once Is Enough, a sailor's classic.

It is mentioned by the character Charlie Marlow in Joseph Conrad's book Lord Jim.

A chapter of In Search of the Castaways by Jules Verne is set in its bay.

== Notable people ==
- Francisco Varela (1946–2001), biologist and philosopher, was born in Talcahuano.
- Juan Onofre Chamorro (1885–1941), trade union leader, was born in Talcahuano.

== Climate ==
Climate data for Talcahuano
Month	Jan	Feb	Mar	Apr	May	Jun	Jul	Aug	Sep	Oct	Nov	Dec	Year
Mean daily maximum °C (°F)	21.5 (70.7)	21.3 (70.3)	19.9 (67.8)	17.4 (63.3)	14.6 (58.3)	12.7 (54.9)	12.2 (54.0)	13.0 (55.4)	14.3 (57.7)	15.7 (60.3)	17.8 (64.0)	20.1 (68.2)	16.7 (62.1)
Daily mean °C (°F)	16.5 (61.7)	16.1 (61.0)	14.6 (58.3)	12.8 (55.0)	11.3 (52.3)	9.8 (49.6)	9.2 (48.6)	9.4 (48.9)	10.3 (50.5)	11.6 (52.9)	13.4 (56.1)	15.4 (59.7)	12.5 (54.6)
Mean daily minimum °C (°F)	11.7 (53.1)	11.3 (52.3)	10.4 (50.7)	9.3 (48.7)	8.4 (47.1)	6.9 (44.4)	6.5 (43.7)	6.4 (43.5)	7.1 (44.8)	7.8 (46.0)	9.2 (48.6)	10.7 (51.3)	8.8 (47.8)
Average precipitation mm (inches)	17.4 (0.69)	15.7 (0.62)	35.4 (1.39)	73.7 (2.90)	197.2 (7.76)	220.5 (8.68)	204.5 (8.05)	163.6 (6.44)	90.2 (3.55)	53.9 (2.12)	35.3 (1.39)	24.9 (0.98)	1,132.3 (44.57)
Average relative humidity (%)	73	77	80	84	89	89	89	88	85	83	81	76	83
Source: Bioclimatografia de Chile

Climate data for Punta Tumbes
Month	Jan	Feb	Mar	Apr	May	Jun	Jul	Aug	Sep	Oct	Nov	Dec	Year
Mean daily maximum °C (°F)	18.7 (65.7)	18.7 (65.7)	17.8 (64.0)	16.1 (61.0)	14.6 (58.3)	13.2 (55.8)	13.0 (55.4)	13.1 (55.6)	13.9 (57.0)	15.0 (59.0)	16.1 (61.0)	17.7 (63.9)	15.7 (60.2)
Daily mean °C (°F)	15.1 (59.2)	15.5 (59.9)	14.2 (57.6)	12.7 (54.9)	11.6 (52.9)	10.2 (50.4)	9.9 (49.8)	9.7 (49.5)	10.4 (50.7)	11.4 (52.5)	12.7 (54.9)	14.2 (57.6)	11.5 (52.7)
Mean daily minimum °C (°F)	11.5 (52.7)	11.5 (52.7)	10.8 (51.4)	9.8 (49.6)	8.7 (47.7)	7.4 (45.3)	6.9 (44.4)	6.7 (44.1)	7.2 (45.0)	8.2 (46.8)	9.3 (48.7)	10.6 (51.1)	9.0 (48.3)
Average precipitation mm (inches)	11.0 (0.43)	9.7 (0.38)	28.7 (1.13)	60.9 (2.40)	145.5 (5.73)	159.4 (6.28)	147.5 (5.81)	115.2 (4.54)	69.2 (2.72)	34.1 (1.34)	27.8 (1.09)	19.7 (0.78)	828.7 (32.63)
Average relative humidity (%)	81	83	81	86	86	87	87	85	84	84	83	83	84
Source: Bioclimatografia de Chile

Some views of Talcahuano

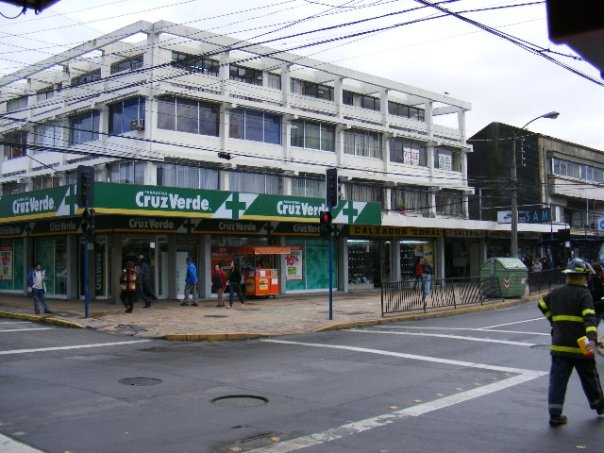
Center of Talcahuano

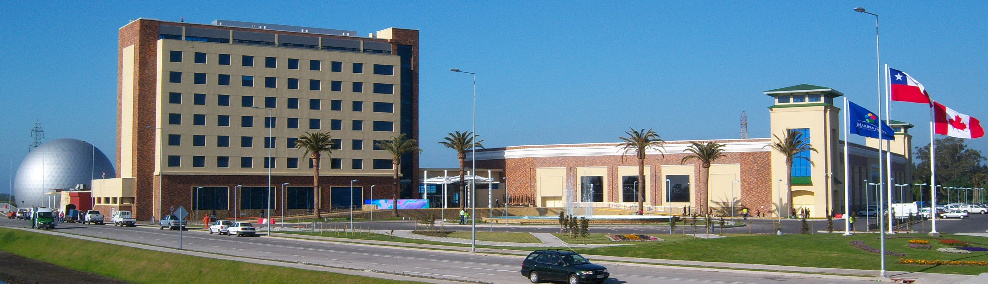
Casino of Talcahuano

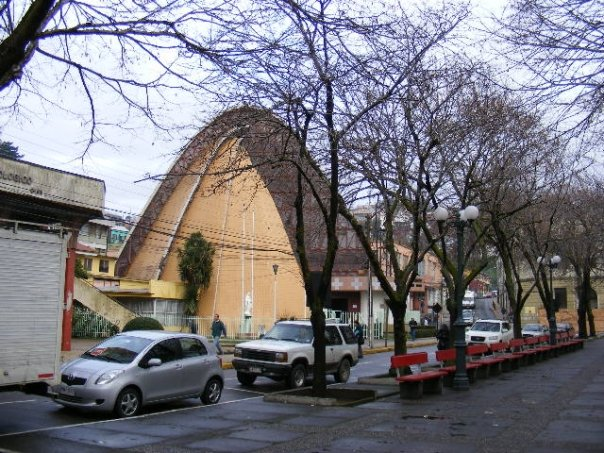
Church of Talcahuano

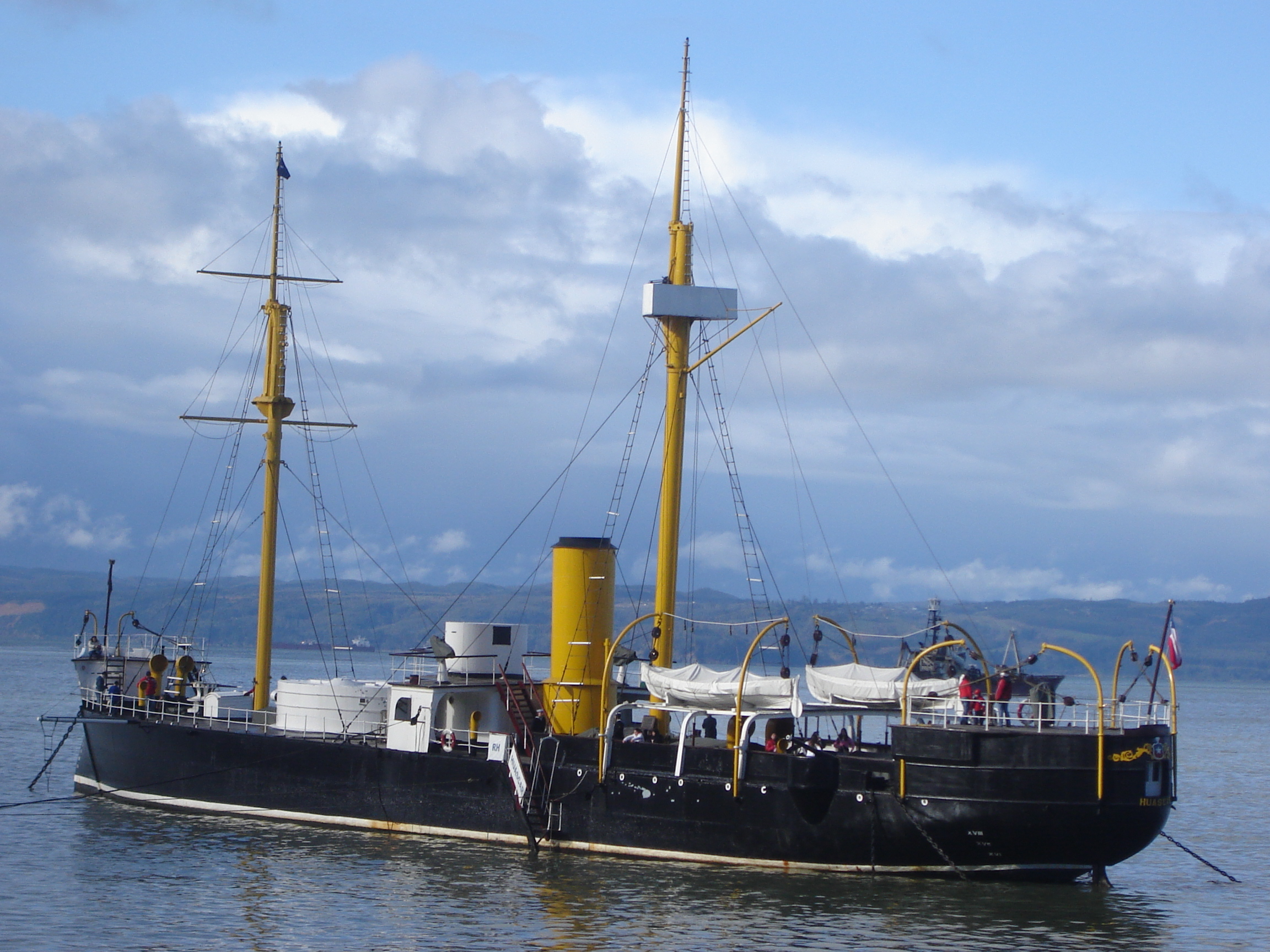
Monitor Huáscar

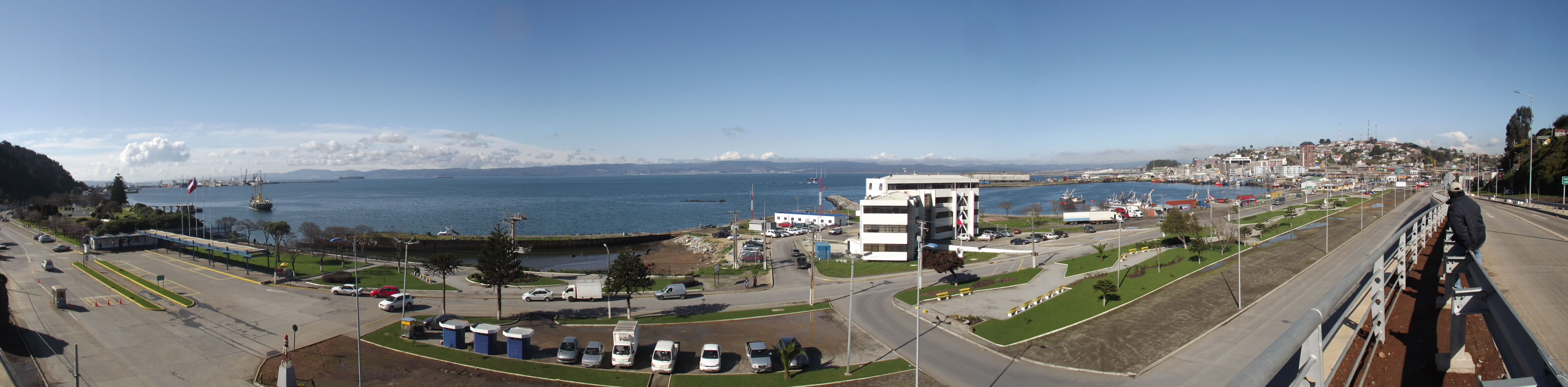
View of Port
