= Juan Onofre Chamorro =

Chilean trade union leader (1885–1941)

Juan O. Chamorro
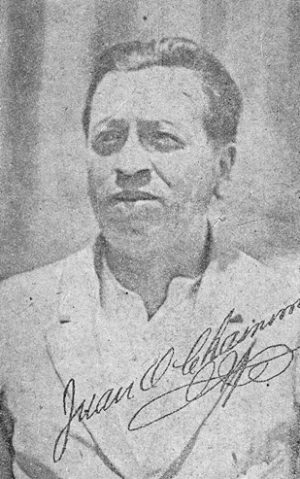
- Chamorro in 1921
- Born: Juan Onofre Chamorro Azócar; 1885; Talcahuano, Biobío, Chile
- Died: 23 June 1941 (aged 55–56); Valparaíso, Chile
- Spouse: Flora Soza Velásquez
- Parents: Juan de Dios Chamorro Hernández (father); María Celia Azócar Burgos (mother)

Juan Onofre Chamorro Azócar (1885–1941) was a Chilean trade union leader. The son of a socialist politician and journalist, Chamorro led the dockworkers' union in Valparaíso, which became the basis for the Chilean Regional Workers' Federation (FORCH) and later the Chilean Industrial Workers of the World (IWW-C), both of which he founded.

== Biography ==
Juan Onofre Chamorro Azócar was born in 1885, in Talcahuano, Chile. His father, Juan de Dios Chamorro Hernández, was a member of the Democrat Party (PD) and edited the newspaper La Industria. After coming of age, in 1905, Chamorro moved to Valparaíso, where he was educated as a mechanic at the Escuela de Artes y Oficios (Chile). In March 1910, he married Flora Soza Velásquez, with whom he had a son; both his wife and child would later die from malnutrition.

Like his father, Chamorro worked as an activist for the PD, within which he educated himself about politics and sociology. He contributed to a series of left-wing newspapers, including Libertad, La Defensa Obrera and La Batalla; he also founded his own newspaper, Mar de Tierra. In 1907, he became general secretary of the Valparaíso dockworkers' union and led a general strike, for which he was imprisoned. The PD subsequently denounced him as a "professional agitator", which provoked his shift towards anarchism. After he was released from prison, state repression prevented him from returning to work as a mechanic or finding another job in the docks, forcing him to work as a butcher in order to sustain himself.

In 1911, the dockworkers' union resumed its activities, establishing a social centre with a library and night school, where Chamorro worked as a teacher. In 1913, Chamorro organised a demonstration on International Workers' Day, which saw 15,000 workers participate, and for which Chamorro was again arrested. He subsequently founded the Chilean Regional Workers' Federation (FORCH), a federation of benefit societies, for which he served as general secretary. In October 1913, the FORCH led a general strike; Chamorro was preemptively arrested, but this only strengthened the resolve of striking workers. During this period, Chamorro also formed links with the Peruvian Regional Workers' Federation (FORP).

By the outbreak of World War I, Chamorro was kept under constant surveillance by the state, which brought him into frequent conflict with the police. In 1916, Chamorro called a congress of maritime workers' unions in Valparaíso, where a general strike to implement the eight-hour day was declared. Chamorro was imprisoned again and the right-wing press orchestrated a smear campaign against him, prompting Chamorro to carry revolvers with him for self-defense. In order to avoid being recognised by police, Chamorro intentionally distorted his face when appearing in public.

In the wake of the strike's suppression, Chamorro started to think that a new form of trade union organisation was necessary. Influenced by the programme of industrial unionism, in 1918, he established a Chilean branch of the Industrial Workers of the World (IWW-C) and was elected as its general secretary. In 1920, the IWW-C was declared to be a terrorist organisation and Chamorro was imprisoned for almost a year while its members were prosecuted. In prison, Chamorro formed a mutual aid organisation, which established a prison library and organised an International Workers Day demonstration, drawing the attention of the left-wing press. Even after he was released from prison in February 1921, he continued to visit other prisoners and maintained contact with the mutual aid group.

Chamorro kept a low profile after his release from prison, staying out of trade union organising and debates between anarcho-syndicalists and industrial unionists. He only returned to trade union organising in 1925, when he participated in a series of maritime workers' conventions. During the dictatorship of Carlos Ibáñez del Campo, Chamorro went into hiding. By the 1930s, he was only attending syndicalist rallies infrequently. Juan Chamorro died in a hospital in Valparaíso, on 23 June 1941.

== Bibliography ==
- Craib, Raymond (2016). The Cry of the Renegade: Politics and Poetry in Interwar Chile. Oxford University Press. ISBN 9780190241353.
- Edwards, Ryan (2018). "Postcolonial Latin America, since 1800" (PDF). A Global History of Convicts and Penal Colonies. Bloomsbury Academic. pp. 245–270.
- Gambone, Larry (1996). The Libertarian Movement in Chile. Red Lion Press. OCLC 45554330.
- Lagos Mieres, Manuel André (2020). "CHAMORRO, Juan O.". Diccionario biográfico de las izquierdas latinoamericanas (in Spanish). Centro de Documentación e Investigación de la Cultura de Izquierdas.
- Savala, Joshua (2019). "Ports of Transnational Labor Organizing: Anarchism along the Peruvian-Chilean Littoral, 1916–1928". Hispanic American Historical Review. 99 (3): 501–531. doi:10.1215/00182168-7573529.
