= DITSELA =

South Africa union education organisation

DITSELA (the Development Institute for Training, Support and Education for Labour), also known as the DITSELA Workers' Education Institute, is a union education organisation in South Africa. It was founded in 1996 by the main union federations, and is mandated to provide programmes that develop union capacity, provide workers and trade unionists access to higher education, recognise workers' experiential knowledge, and promote critical thinking and activism. DITSELA was described in a 2007 International Labour Organization report as the 'largest union education institute in Africa'.

== History ==
DITSELA was established with the support of the then-largest union federations in South Africa, the Federation of Unions of South Africa (FEDUSA) and the Congress of South African Trade Unions (COSATU) to help build a strong trade union movement. It was subsequently joined by the National Council of Trade Unions (NACTU). It was intended to consolidate the existing union education programmes, and help the unions develop their own education programmes.

== Activities, Scope and Funding ==
The acronym DITSELA is a pun: ditsela also means 'pathways' in Sesotho, and the institute's slogan is 'Pathways to a Strong Labour Movement'. DITSELA runs five main programmes, including a Women’s Leadership Development Programme (WLDP), and the DITSELA Advanced National Labour Education Programme (DANLEP), the latter having graduated more than 1,000 people from its inception to 2011. DITSELA has offices in Johannesburg and Cape Town, and some of its programmes, such as the WLDP, are offered in conjunction with the University of Cape Town and the University of the Western Cape.

DITSELA's main funder, however, is not the unions but the state. While the institute helped open the door to the formal accreditation of union education itself, it was criticised within some unions for professionalising this function and linking it to career development, and for moving it outside union structures.
