= Chilean Regional Workers' Federation =

Chilean trade union federation

- Federación Obrera Regional Chilena
- Abbreviation: FORCh
- Merged into: General Confederation of Workers
- Formation: January 1926; 100 years ago
- Dissolved: 23 February 1927; 99 years ago
- Type: National trade union federation
- Headquarters: Santiago, Chile
- Leader: Luís Herdia

The Chilean Regional Workers' Federation (Spanish: Federación Obrera Regional Chilena; (Note: Also translated as Workers' Federation of the Chilean Region or Regional Federation of Chilean Workers.) FORCh) was a Chilean anarcho-syndicalist trade union federation, established in 1926, following a split in the Industrial Workers of the World (IWW). It led the movement against Law 4504, which would have deducted wages to pay into a social insurance system; its planned general strike was called off after the government agreed to reform the law. After another abortive general strike in January 1927, it was suppressed by the dictatorship of Carlos Ibáñez del Campo.

== Establishment ==
By 1924, the Chilean labor movement had experienced a resurgence, as a combination of increased production, high employment and a rising cost of living drove more workers towards trade unions. The movement was largely split between the communists and anarcho-syndicalists, with the Industrial Workers of the World (IWW) occupying a middle ground between the two. Anarcho-syndicalists were the predominant force in the labor movements in Santiago and Valparaíso, where printing workers' and shoemakers' unions began calling for more coordination between anarcho-syndicalist unions. In May 1924, they broke away from the IWW, with a view to forming a new anarcho-syndicalist trade union federation. They berought together the most militant unions in central Chile, including those of carpenters, masons, plasterers, plumbers and printers.

In 1925, falling nitrate production caused an economic recession. Rising unemployment levels, due in part to mass layoffs of miners, weakened the bargaining power of most Chilean trade unions and led to the decline of strike actions. Recognizing their declining power, the anarcho-syndicalists in Santiago and Valparaíso sought to create a new trade union federation to coordinate their activities and thereby increase their strength. They soon began looking to their counterparts in Argentina and Uruguay for an organizational model to unite workers along industrial lines.

In January 1926, unions and resistance societies in Santiago, Valparaíso and Viña del Mar established the Chilean Regional Workers' Federation (Spanish: Federación Obrera Regional Chilena; FORCh), which became the main representative of organized anarcho-syndicalism in Chile. This new federation was loosely organized and decentralized, with little central control over its member unions and federations, which were considered fully autonomous. This highly autonomous organizational structure rendered the FORCh ineffective at coordinating its member sections, while sustained ideological debates between members of the FORCh and the IWW further weakened the movement. Pessimism increasingly swept the ranks of the anarcho-syndicalists, with FORCh leader Luís Herdia observing that many anarcho-syndicalists now doubted whether trade unions could be vehicles for revolution.

== Movement against Law 4054 ==
When a new labor law, Law 4054, introduced a system of social insurance payments that came directly out of workers' wages, it was vocally criticized as by the anarcho-syndicalists, who called it "legal robbery". Anarcho-syndicalists in Santiago and Valparaíso established a Committee in Favor of the Abolition of Law 4054, which quickly received support from labor organizations throughout the country. When the law took effect on 22 January 1926, the Committee called a one-day general strike to take place the following month; the call was taken up by the FORCh, the Federation of Chilean Workers (FOCh) and the mutual aid societies, which threatened to make it the biggest labor demonstration in years.

However, factional divides soon caused the effort to break down, as the FOCh pulled out of the planned strike, not wanting to join a movement led by anarcho-syndicalists. When the day came on 20 February, all activity in Santiago shut down, with the exception of the FOCh-controlled tram and bus networks. The FOCh later held its own work stoppage on 8 March, and this time, the trams and busses stopped, while factories remained open and construction projects continued. Despite both days of action, Law 4054 would remain in place.

Trade union activity largely subsided until September 1926, when the FORCh shoemakers' union ordered strikes in every factory that deducted social security payments from wages. They sought to put pressure on employers, rather than the government, to halt the implementation of Law 4054. It brought many employers in Santiago and Valparaíso into the opposition to Law 4054, due to the extra costs it would place on them. But when shoe factories in Santiago attempted to implement the law in October 1926, the shoemakers' union called an indefinite general strike, which received support from other unions of the FORCh and even solidarity from the FOCh tram union. The government agreed to form a committee to reform the law, convincing the workers to call off the strike.

== 1927 general strike ==
In January 1927, after the state railway company attempted to force its workers to work longer hours, railroad workers' unions called a general strike to defend the eight-hour day. Workers throughout Santiago called strikes, with each union presenting their own piecemeal demands to the government, rather than employers. Many rail workers did not participate in the strike, due to threats of strikebreaking and government promises to meet their demands. The FORCh's construction and factory workers' unions also opted not to take part. When the work stoppage happened on 16 January, most infrastructure functioned as usual, while police arrested striking workers and shut down rallies in Santiago and Valparaíso. Although some rail workers stayed on strike and achieved their initial demands, the general strike collapsed amid the general disorganization and disunity. The Chilean labor movement had been substantially weakened and was left without much bargaining power to win their demands.

== Dissolution ==
On 23 February 1927, Minister of the Interior Carlos Ibáñez del Campo proclaimed the dissolution of the anarchist and communist labor organizations. Police raided the offices of the FORCh, IWW and other trade unions, rounded up their union leaders and interned them in prison camps. By March, the Chilean labor movement had effectively been destroyed, with its leaders either arrested, in hiding or in exile. Some Chilean anarchists found refuge in Buenos Aires, where they printed propaganda condemning the Ibáñez dictatorship. Under these conditions, Chilean anarchists began seeking to reunify their movement. Following the deposition of Ibáñez in 1931, the remnants of the FORCh and IWW reorganized themselves into the General Confederation of Workers (Spanish: Confederación General de Trabajadores; CGT), which was active in the country throughout the 1930s.

== Bibliography ==
- Angell, Alan (1972). "History of the Labour Movement and its Legacy". Politics and the Labour Movement in Chile. Oxford University Press. pp. 11–41. ISBN 0-19-214991-1.
- DeShazo, Peter (1983). Urban Workers and Labor Unions in Chile, 1902–1927. University of Wisconsin Press. ISBN 0299092208.
- Loveman, Brian (1987). "Chile". In Greenfield, Gerald Michael; Maram, Sheldon L. (eds.). Latin American Labor Organizations. New York: Greenwood Press. pp. 129–178. ISBN 0-313-22834-5.
- Roddick, Jackie (1981). "The Failure of Populism in Chile: Labour movement and Politics Before World War II". Boletín de Estudios Latinoamericanos y Del Caribe (31): 61–89. JSTOR 25675112.
- Simon, S. Fanny (1946). "Anarchism and Anarcho-Syndicalism in South America". The Hispanic American Historical Review. 26 (1). Duke University Press: 38–59. doi:10.2307/2507692. ISSN 1527-1900. JSTOR 2507692.
