= Meat riots =

Violent riot in Santiago, Chile, in 1905

Coordinates: 33.448°S 70.671°W

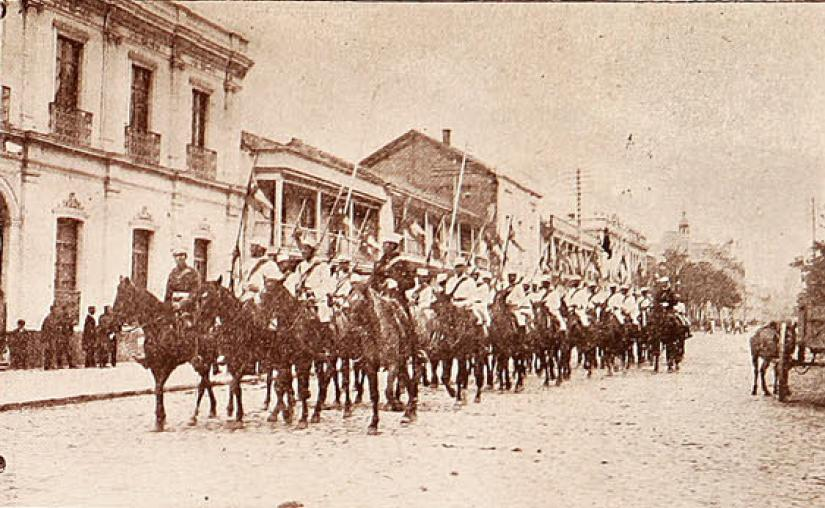
- Dragoons roaming the streets
Date	22–27 October, 1905
Location	Chile
Result	Protests repressed, meeting repressed, Chilean government victory

Belligerents
Workers protesters	Government of Chile: Chilean Army

Commanders and leaders
	Germán Riesco; Roberto Silva Renard

Casualties and losses
230 killed	20 killed

The Meat riot (Spanish: Huelga de la carne), in the Chilean capital Santiago in October 1905, was a violent riot that originated from a demonstration against the tariffs applied to the cattle imports from Argentina.

== Background ==
The establishment of the Buenos Aires-Mendoza railroad in 1885 ended the lengthy and costly trade with carts that connected these two regions of Argentina and facilitated cattle exports from the pampas to Chile, albeit in the last portion of the route the cattle had to walk over the high mountain passes of the Andes. These imports resulted in a lowering of meat prices in Chile.

In 1887 Sociedad Nacional de Agricultura (National Agriculture Society), a landowners organization, proposed to put a tariff on the Argentine cattle that Chile was importing from Argentina. In 1888 the attempt to pass this as a law in the Chamber of Deputies was frustrated by several urban workers social organizations, the Democrat Party, and mine owners that protested against it.

Sociedad Nacional de la Agricultura continued to support the implementation of a tariff and in 1897 it was passed as a law in congress, principally as part of a protectionist law package. The package was supported by the Democrat Party, but in 1898 and 1899 it called for the abolition of the tariff returning to its old stance. In 1902 a series of demonstrations against the tariff took place. Scholar Benjamin S. Orlove suggest that it was the rise of staple food prices that led to renewed protests against the tariff in 1905. This would have been because high staple prices would have led people to have less money available for buying meat. The prices of meat themselves remained stable in the period preceding the Meat riots.

== Demonstration ==
In September 1905, members of the Democrat Party and several mutual aid societies of Santiago met to form an umbrella organization named Comité Central de Abolición del Impuesto al Ganado (Central Committee for the Abolishment of the Livestock Tariff). The new organisation called for a demonstration on Sunday October 22. State authorities approved a demonstration route. The plans for the demonstration spread through word of mouth and support from the centrist Catholic newspaper El Chileno.

At the place and time of meeting in Santiago on Sunday, it has been estimated that fifty thousand people gathered. Another estimate puts the number at twelve thousand of which at least 6000 belonged to the working class. Considering that Santiago at the time had 320,000 inhabitants, the demonstration was huge. Apart from those that gathered in Santiago demonstrations were held all over Chile.

From the meeting point at La Alameda, a demonstration group that included ten neighborhood associations plus 41 trade unions and mutual aid societies marched to La Moneda Palace where they planned to deliver a petition to president Germán Riesco.

== Red Week ==
Upon arrival to La Moneda it was found that president Germán Riesco was not there. A minor group of protesters were told by government representative that the president was at his residence a few blocks away. This minority group marched to the residence where protest leaders were allowed to enter to deliver the petition document and to chat with the president. The chat went over to lengthy discussions. Meanwhile, the majority of the protesters were unaware of the meeting and thought that the president had turned his back on them by refusing a meeting. A rumour saying that the president had left Santiago spread. In this atmosphere violence erupted. Demonstrators attacked "buildings and public structure" and police attacked the demonstrators.

Police stations, private residences, telegraph and telephone lines were attacked and stores were pillaged. At 4–5 o'clock most workers retired from the city center. By the same time the looting intensified.

== See also ==
- List of food riots

== Bibliography ==
- La "huelga de la carne" retrieved 03. September 2008
