= Black Flame (book) =

2009 book written by Lucien van der Walt and Michael Schmidt

- Author: Lucien van der Walt and Michael Schmidt
- Language: English
- Subject: Anarchism and syndicalism
- Genre: Politics, History
- Publisher: AK Press
- Publication date: 12 February 2009
- Publication place: South Africa
- ISBN: 978-1-904859-16-1

Black Flame: The Revolutionary Class Politics of Anarchism and Syndicalism is a book written by sociologist Lucien van der Walt and journalist Michael Schmidt that deals with "the ideas, history and relevance of the broad anarchist tradition through a survey of 150 years of global history." The book includes a preface by Scottish anarchist and former prisoner Stuart Christie.

Conceived as the first of two volumes in the authors' Counter-Power series, Black Flame is a thematic work on the history and theory of global anarchism and syndicalism. Its sequel, Global Fire, was to present a global historical narrative of the movement, but was cancelled by AK Press after the revelation that Michael Schmidt had ties to white nationalism.

A German translation of Black Flame appeared in late 2013, entitled Schwarze Flamme: Revolutionäre Klassenpolitik im Anarchismus und Syndikalismus, with Greek and Spanish translations nearing publication.

== The authors ==
The authors are South Africans. Michael Schmidt, a senior journalist with an activist background, is now a journalism trainer. Lucien van der Walt, an industrial sociologist who works on labour and left movements and capitalist restructuring, also has an activist background. Van der Walt is also the editor of Anarchism and Syndicalism in the Colonial and Postcolonial World, 1870–1940.

== Core theses ==
According to the book, the core ideas of anarchism (including its anarcho-syndicalist variant) include revolutionary class struggle by the working class and peasantry, internationalism, opposition to all forms of social and economic inequality, anti-imperialism, and a commitment to creating a self-managed global system of libertarian socialism, based on participatory planning and the abolition of markets and states. Black Flame's core theses include the propositions that "the global anarchist movement emerged in the First International, that syndicalism is an integral part of the broad anarchist tradition, that this tradition centres on rationalism, socialism and anti-authoritarianism, that the writings of Mikhail Bakunin and Pyotr Kropotkin are representative of its core ideas, and that this 'narrow' definition is both empirically defensible and analytically useful."

== Defining anarchism ==
A striking feature of Black Flame is the argument that "'class struggle' anarchism, sometimes called revolutionary or communist anarchism, is not a type of anarchism ... it is the only anarchism", and so it does not include ideas sometimes called individualist anarchists, identified with figures like William Godwin and Max Stirner. Regarding those the book describes as "philosophical, individualist, spiritual and 'lifestyle' traditions", the authors say "we do not regard these currents as part of the broad anarchist tradition."

Black Flame insists that while anarchism owes an immense debt to the earlier current of mutualists and to Pierre-Joseph Proudhon, it cannot be reduced to, or conflated with, Mutualism. For example, its stresses class struggle and social revolution, unlike Mutualism, which envisaged gradual change through building cooperatives. The book argues that there are no rational or historical grounds for including currents like Stirnerism and Mutualism in the anarchist tradition. Some studies do this, by defining anarchism, or anarchist schools of thought, as basically an anti-statist movement. The authors argue that if this was true, then Marxism–Leninism and economic liberalism must also be considered anarchist, as one aims at the "withering away of the state" and the other at a massive reduction in state control. These currents cannot be logically excluded from anarchism, if anarchism is defined as anti-statism, but they say it would also be nonsensical to include them within anarchism.

According to the authors, anarchism (including syndicalism) emerged as a movement in the International Workingmen's Association, or First International, founded in 1864; the new anarchist current emerged simultaneously in Europe and Latin America. After the International split in 1872, the anarchist majority sometimes known as the Anarchist St. Imier International, attracted affiliates in central Asia and North Africa. This is ignored by what they describe as flawed 20th-century scholarship, which reduced anarchism to anti-statism, so conflating the movement with earlier and parallel libertarian currents. Thus, anarchism is regarded here as a distinct, continuous, and novel ideological and political tradition, not a gallery of superficially similar moments and thinkers.

Anarchism was born as a radical, anti-capitalist current in the radical working class and peasant milieu. Since this milieu was the product of modern capitalist and the modern state in the 1800s, the first anarchist formations emerged in the 1860s and 1870s in areas by then being reshaped by these forces: parts of East as well as West Europe, North Africa as well as North America, and Latin America and the Caribbean. As capitalist modernity expanded into southern Africa from the 1880s and east Asia from the 1890s, anarchism spread into those regions as well. Further, since syndicalism is a variant of anarchism, syndicalists who rejected the anarchist label, such as James Connolly and Bill Haywood, are nonetheless still part of the anarchist tradition by the authors.

According to Black Flame, it is not self-identity or calling oneself an anarchist that makes one an anarchist; anarchist has been used by the radical right, by free-market neoliberals, and by rock stars, and anarcho-capitalism is described as "a contradiction in terms". It is the ideological content that matters, and this content goes back to the Bakuninist wing of the First International. Thus, figures like the syndicalist Bill Haywood, who often used anarchism in a negative way, form part of the larger anarchist tradition, while figures with no real connection to that tradition, such as Stirner, do not.

=== Mass syndicalism versus insurrectionism ===
Van der Walt and Schmidt argue that the main divide in the anarchist movement has been between two main strategic approaches, "mass and insurrectionist anarchism". The book is closer to the mass anarchist perspective, although it provides considerable coverage of insurrectionism. For the authors, mass anarchism "stresses that only mass movements can create revolutionary change in society," and "that such movements are typically built through struggles around immediate issues and reforms.”

A key example of mass anarchism is syndicalism, which is a variant of anarchism, and a key mass anarchist approach. The authors argue that not all mass anarchists are syndicalists, and not all anarchists are mass anarchists. They write that "[t]he insurrectionist approach, in contrast, claims that reforms are illusory, that movements like unions are willing or unwitting bulwarks of the existing order, and that formal organisations are authoritarian." Consequently, insurrectionist anarchism typically emphasises violent action, which is known as propaganda by the deed, as the "most important means of evoking a spontaneous revolutionary upsurge" by the popular classes.

=== Other themes, areas and topics ===
While Black Flame's' approach to defining anarchism has attracted a great deal of attention, this is a minor part of the book. Other areas covered include:

- anarchist economic theory, compared to Marxian economics and economic liberalism;
- the class composition of anarchist and syndicalist movements;
- peasant anarchism: causes, patterns and outcomes;
- the case against "Spanish exceptionalism";
- debates over dual organisationalism;
- anarchism, syndicalism and the promotion of revolutionary "counterpower" and "counterculture";
- debates over trade unions in anarchism;
- anarchists and syndicalists in anti-imperialist and anti-colonial struggles; and
- anarchism, syndicalism, and women's freedom.

The book engages with contemporary academic thinking on issues, such as race and gender, but does so by a close examination of "the rich veins of anarchist and syndicalist thought on the national question, on women's struggles, on union strategy." The aim is not "'update' anarchism by blending it with current academic approaches", but to examine "what the actual historical anarchist and syndicalist movement actually thought" and "actually did". According to the authors, it is only from the basis of a solid understanding the movement's history and theory, as "an intellectual tradition that has a great deal of insight into issues of social and economic inequality, as well as a strategy around these issues", that it becomes possible and useful to engage with current academic work.

== Global scope ==
In terms of scope, Black Flame takes a uniquely global approach which, while also analysing Western Europe and North America, takes the history of anarchism and syndicalism in Latin America, Africa, and Asia seriously.

These regions are knitted together into a single global account, which overviews core themes, developments and debates in the anarchist and syndicalist tradition. Van der Walt and Schmidt criticise the standard works on the overall history and theory of anarchism and syndicalism for focusing on the North Atlantic region, and for insisting upon an indefensible "Spanish exceptionalism", the notion that in Spain alone were anarchism and syndicalism mass movements. A global view shows that Spain was by no means unique. According to van der Walt, "once you look globally, you find mass movements of comparable, sometimes even greater, influence in countries ranging from Argentina, to China, to Cuba, to Mexico, to Peru, to the Ukraine and so on. What gets a bit lost in studies that focus on Western Europe is that most of anarchist and syndicalist history took place elsewhere. In other words, you can't understand anarchism unless you understand that much of its history was in the east and the south, not only in the north and the west."

Therefore, besides movements like the Spanish Confederación Nacional del Trabajo, the book examines movements like the Industrial Workers of the World, the Federacion Obrera Regional Argentina, the Uruguayan Anarchist Federation, the Korean People's Association in Manchuria, and the Ukrainian Makhnovshchina. Attention is also paid to figures and movements partially influenced by anarchism, such as Augusto César Sandino, and the Industrial and Commercial Workers' Union, in southern Africa. Black Flame also examines anarchist and syndicalist ideas and debates globally. For example, the account of anarchist debates on whether the Soviet Union was state capitalist includes the views of Asian anarchists, while sections on anarchism, syndicalism, and race include coverage of Chinese, Mexican, Peruvian, and South African materials and movements.

=== Black Flame and a global anarchist/syndicalist canon ===
Black Flame argues that East Europeans like Mikhail Bakunin and Peter Kropotkin are the two most important anarchist thinkers but that, globally, "the movement had an amazing array of writers and thinkers, truly cosmopolitan."

The anarchist and syndicalist canon must be understood as a global one, that must "include figures from within but also without the West", ideally including figures like Li Pei Kan (Ba Jin) and Liu Shifu ("Shifu") of China, James Connolly of Ireland, Armando Borghi and Errico Malatesta of Italy, Nestor Makhno and Piotr Arshinov, of Ukraine, Juana Rouco Buela of Argentina, Lucía Sánchez Saornil and Jaime Balius of Spain, Ricardo Flores Magón, Juana Belén Gutiérrez de Mendoza, Antonio Gomes y Soto and Práxedis Guerrero of Mexico, Ferdinand Domela Nieuwenhuis of the Netherlands, Ōsugi Sakae, Kōtoku Shūsui, and Kanno Sugako of Japan, Lucy Parsons and Emma Goldman of the United States, Enrique Roig de San Martín of Cuba, Shin Chaeho and Kim Jwa-jin of Korea, Rudolph Rocker of Germany, Neno Vasco and Maria Lacerda de Moura of Brazil, Abraham Guillén of Spain and Uruguay, and S. P. Bunting and T. W. Thibedi of South Africa.

== Reception ==
Black Flame received positive reviews from Mark Leier, Iain McKay, and Wayne Price, among others. However, the strict definition of anarchism presented in the book was quite controversial: McKay and Price objected to the exclusion of individualists and insurrectionists in their reviews, and concern about sectarianism was expressed by Price, Ruth Kinna, and Carl Levy.
