= Lucien van der Walt =

South African writer, professor of Sociology, and labour educator (born 1972)

- Born: 8 September 1972 (age 54); Krugersdorp, South Africa
- Occupations: Professor and labour educator
- Website: lucienvanderwalt.wordpress.com

Lucien van der Walt (born 8 September 1972) is a South African writer, professor of Sociology and labour educator. His research engages the anarchist/syndicalist tradition of Mikhail Bakunin and Peter Kropotkin; trade unionism and working class history, particularly in southern Africa; and neoliberal state restructuring. He currently teaches and researches at Rhodes University in the Eastern Cape, South Africa, and previously worked at the University of the Witwatersrand. His 2007 PhD on anarchism and syndicalism in South Africa in the early 1900s won both the international prize for the best PhD dissertation from the Labor History journal, and the Council for the Development of Social Science Research in Africa prize for best African PhD thesis.

Van der Walt is also involved in union and workers' education, including for the DITSELA workers education institute, and a coordinating and teaching role in the Global Labour University, the former National Union of Metalworkers of South Africa Social Theory course at the University of the Witwatersrand, the former Workers Library and Museum, the political schools of the South African Unemployed Peoples' Movement and the current Eastern Cape short course program for metal workers' unions at Rhodes University. He formerly led media and communications for the Anti-Privatisation Forum (APF), a coalition of social movements.

== Books ==
- Kirk Helliker and Lucien van der Walt (eds.), 2018, Politics at a Distance from the State: Radical and African Perspectives, London, New York: Routledge, 172pp.
- Lucien van der Walt, 2014, Negro E Vermelho: Anarquismo, Sindicalismo Revolucionário ePpessoas de cor na África Meridional nas Décadas de 1880 a 1920, São Paulo: Editora Faísca, 103pp.
- Steven J. Hirsch and Lucien van der Walt (eds.), 2014, (foreword by Benedict Anderson), Anarchism and Syndicalism in the Colonial and Postcolonial World, 1870–1940: The Praxis of National Liberation, Internationalism, and Social Revolution, Leiden: Brill Academic Publishers, Studies in Global Social History, paperback edition with new material, i–lxxvi,510pp.
- Lucien van der Walt and Michael Schmidt, 2013,Schwarze Flamme: Revolutionäre Klassenpolitik im Anarchismus und Syndikalismus, Hamburg: Edition Nautlius, 560pp.
- Steven Hirsch and Lucien van der Walt, 2010, Anarchism and Syndicalism in the Colonial and Postcolonial World, 1870–1940: The Praxis of National Liberation, Internationalism, and Social Revolution, Leiden: Brill Academic Publishers, Studies in Global Social History, lxxiv+434pp.
- Southern Africa editor, 2009, International Encyclopaedia of Revolution and Protest, New York: Blackwell.
- Lucien van der Walt and Michael Schmidt, 2009, Black Flame: The Revolutionary Class Politics of Anarchism and Syndicalism, Edinburgh and Oakland, CA: AK Press, 500pp.

== See also ==
- Anarchism in South Africa
