= Lévano =

Lévano is a surname. Notable people with the surname include:

- César Lévano (1926–2019), Peruvian journalist
- Delfín Lévano (1885–1941), Peruvian anarchist
