= Anarchism in Latvia =

Anarchism in Latvia emerged from the Latvian National Awakening and saw its apex during the 1905 Russian Revolution. Eventually the Latvian anarchist movement was suppressed by a series of authoritarian regimes in the country.

== History ==
During the time of the Livonian Confederation, peasants retained personal freedom and self-government, but after the Livonian War the power of landowners was expanded, culminating in the establishment of the Duchies of Livonia, Courland and Semigallia under the Polish–Lithuanian Commonwealth, when the peasant class was brought into serfdom. When Livonia was brought under the rule of the Swedish Empire, the abolition of serfdom was briefly proposed, but it was rejected by the region's ruling Baltic German nobility, which desired to retain ownership of the peasants.

After the end of the Great Northern War in 1721, the Baltic region was brought under the rule of the Russian Empire, but the peasants continued to be administered by the Baltic German nobility under a feudal Landtag. Serfdom was subsequently expanded under Catherine the Great, after the defeat of Pugachev's Rebellion. In response, local voices such as Johann Georg Eisen von Schwarzenberg and Garlieb Merkel began to advocate for the abolition of serfdom.

After the suppression of the Kauguri riots in 1802, new peasant laws were introduced that replaced serfdom with villeinage, which tied peasants to the land rather than directly to the land-owners. This was followed by the complete abolition of serfdom throughout most of the Baltic by 1820, preceding the Emancipation reform of 1861 which abolitioned serfdom throughout the entirety of the Russian Empire.

=== The Latvian Revolution ===
Around this time the First Latvian National Awakening was taking place, during which the Young Latvians began to advocate for a romantic nationalism, in opposition to the remnants of feudalism retained by the Baltic German nobility. In the 1880s, the New Current movement emerged from the national awakening, taking a more explicitly political approach, inspired by the socialist ideas of the time. Socialism was particularly appealing to the hundreds of thousands of landless peasants in Latvia, as well as the country's growing urban proletariat.

At the turn of the 20th century, the working classes of the Baltic states began to wage an open struggle against the Russian Empire. Latvian landless peasants began to seize vacant land for themselves, beginning a period of peasant uprisings. When these uprisings were repressed by the landowners, many peasants fled into the woods where they formed partisan detachments known as the "Forest Brothers" and organized to attack wealthy estates and local police. Participation in the detachments was voluntary, with decisions being made by consensus, without organizational hierarchy.

In the wake of Bloody Sunday, a general strike was called in Riga, beginning the 1905 Revolution in Latvia, as Latvian workers began to revolt against both the Russian authorities and German nobility. Anarchist ideas began to spread throughout the Latvian working classes, with the first anarchist groups being established throughout the country, largely led by Latvian Jews. An anarcho-communist group known as the Riga International began to conduct propaganda work among the poor in both the Yiddish and Latvian languages, even translating The Conquest of Bread by Peter Kropotkin into Latvian. Eventually, a number of disparate anarchist groups throughout the Latvian capital united together, establishing the Federation of Riga Anarchist Communist Groups.

By the autumn of 1905, armed conflict between the German nobility and the Latvian peasants began in the rural areas of Vidzeme and Courland. In Courland, the peasants seized or surrounded several towns where they established revolutionary councils. In Vidzeme the fighters took control of the Rūjiena-Pärnu railway line. Altogether, a thousand armed clashes were registered in Latvia in 1905. Anarchists joined in the armed struggle, launching a number of attacks against the forces of the German nationalist paramilitary forces, as well as the property of the Latvian capitalist class.

In response, the Russian Empire declared martial law and began to violently suppress the Latvian revolutionary movement, which anarchists led armed resistance against. In the ensuing repression, many anarchists were arrested and sentenced to hard labor or prison, while a number of young Jewish anarchists were sentenced to death by a military tribunal. In total, hundreds of people were executed, many without trial, while thousands more were sent into exile in Siberia or fled to Western Europe. Latvian anarchists that had fled to London continued their revolutionary activities, taking part in a number of bank robberies that culminated in the events of the Tottenham Outrage and the Siege of Sidney Street.

In Latvia, the anarchist movement was forced by the repression to change its tactics, with many aligning themselves with anarcho-syndicalism. Towards the end of 1907, the Free Workers' Organisation was established in Riga, and its members became known as the Yankovists, after the group's founder. The Yankovists began to organize among the working classes, advocating open class conflict through strikes, expropriations and property destruction. Former social democrats of the Latvian Social Democratic Union and the Social Democracy of the Latvian Territory began to join the Free Workers' Organisation, disillusioned by party politics. However, by September 1908, the organisation was dissolved, as many Yankovists disseminated themselves into legal trade unions.

Following the February Revolution, Latvian revolutionaries began to return to the country, including a number of anarchists. In August 1917, the Liesma group was founded along anarcho-syndicalist lines and went on to actively participate in the October Revolution. After committing some expropriations, the group established the Latvian Anarchists' Club in a small house, which held reading circles and lectures. When faced with the need to begin publishing anarchist literature, the group occupied a larger house and renovated its previous property into a housing cooperative. The group also founded a unit of Black Guards to fight against counter-revolutionary elements. In April 1918, a number of Latvians arrived from Kharkov and joined the Liesma group, which went on to occupy a manor house, open a museum and establish the Latvian Anarchist Theatre. However, their house was soon after raided by the Red Army and the anarchists were arrested, taken to Butyrka prison and tortured. The group was later released, recognized as "ideological revolutionaries", but only after their work had been thoroughly destroyed.

After the Latvian victory over the Bolsheviks in the Latvian War of Independence, the new Republic of Latvia was constituted as a liberal democracy. But the 1934 Latvian coup d'état established an authoritarian regime under Kārlis Ulmanis, which suppressed the country's left-wing opposition. The subsequent Soviet occupation in 1940, Nazi occupation in 1941 and Soviet re-occupation in 1944 ensured the ultimate suppression of any remaining left-wing opposition. The Latvian Soviet Socialist Republic was established under the single-party rule of the Communist Party of Latvia. The country eventually regained its independence during the Singing Revolution, which restored liberal democracy after over 50 years of authoritarian rule.

The anarchist movement slowly began to re-emerge during the 21st century, with a group of Latvian anarchists going on to participate in the 2012 Baltic Anarchist Meeting. In 2017, the former non-partisan Minister of Education and Science, Roberts Ķīlis, stated that he is "an anarchist and does not join political parties".

== See also ==
- Category:Latvian anarchists
- List of anarchist movements by region
- Anarchism in Estonia
- Anarchism in Russia
