= Anarchism in Turkey =

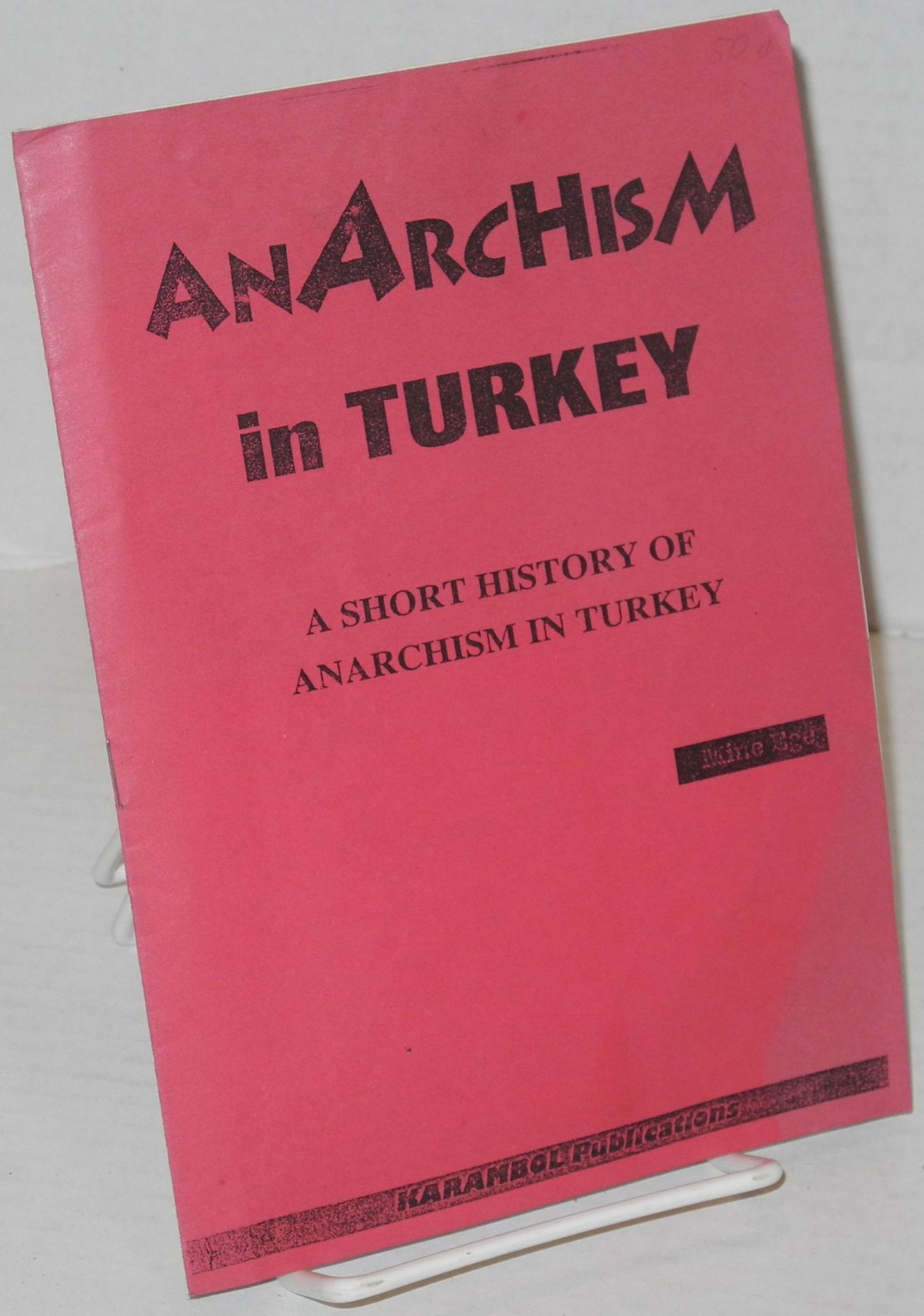
Anarchism in Turkey A Short History of Anarchism in Turkey, London, Karambol Publications, 1994.

Anarchism in Turkey only began to emerge in 1986 with publication of the magazine Kara.

== Historical background ==
=== Ottoman Period ===
The first signs of anarchism in the Ottoman period emerged around Armenian intellectuals. Hamanykh magazine, published in 1895 by Aleksandr Atabekyan, one of the pioneers of the Armenian Revolutionary Federation, has a rich content regarding both anarchist philosophy and the Armenian revolutionary movement. In the same period, Turkish Cypriot Kıbrıslızade Osman Bey's French work Socialisme et Anarchisme (1895) became the first anarchist book published in the Ottomans.

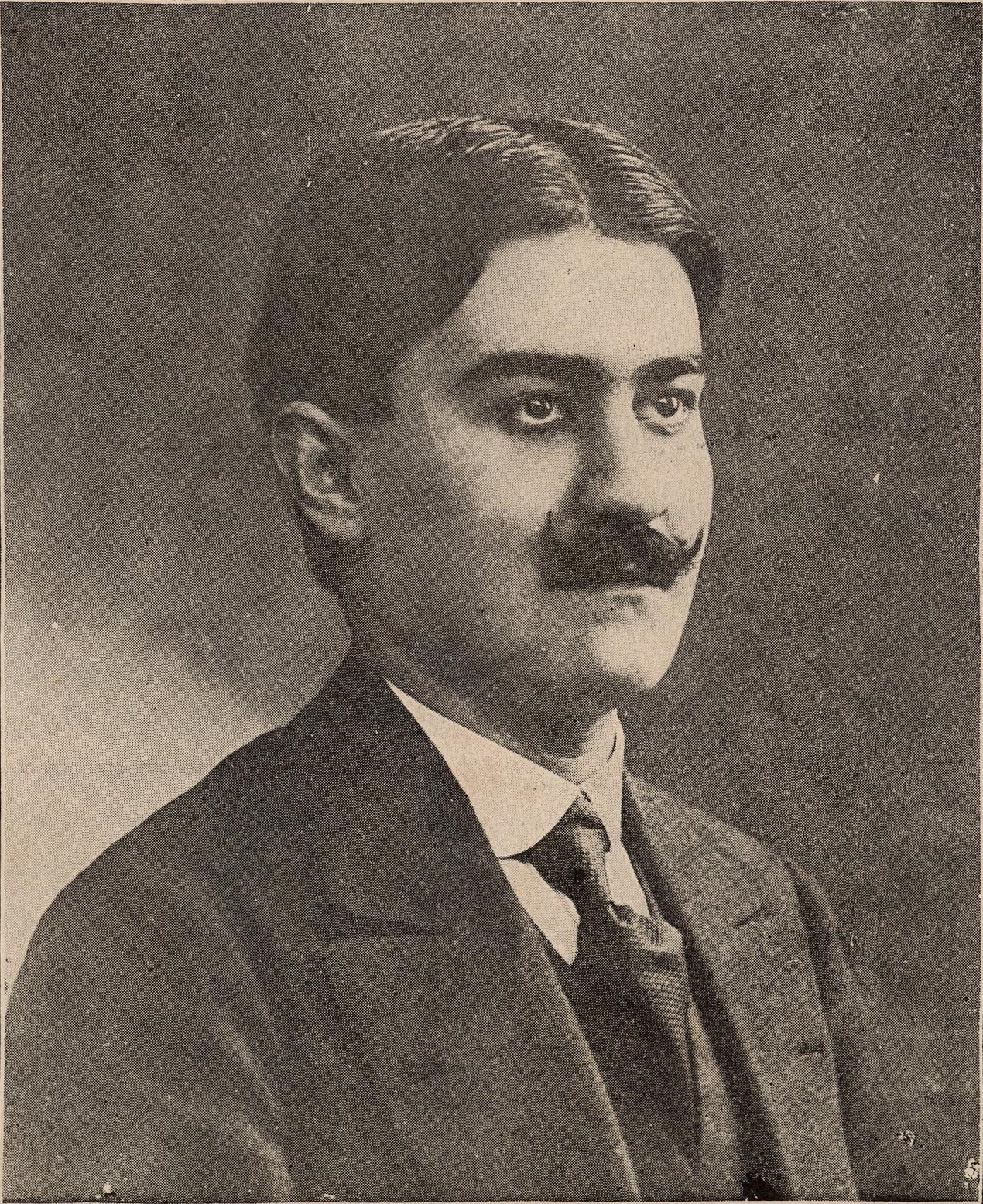
Baha Tevfik, the first Turkish Anarchist and founding member of Ottoman Socialist Party

Baha Tevfik, who is often regarded as the first Turkish anarchist, states in his Felsefe-i Ferd (1913) that from wage slavery to socialism and from socialism to anarchism, a new age will be achieved.

=== Republican Period ===
The first written source of Turkish anarchism is Kropotkin's Ethics, translated by Ahmet Ağaoğlu and published in 1935. There is an ongoing debate on why anarchism has not gained visibility as an alternative leftist policy in the first half of the Republican period.

In the 1970s, while Marxist approaches dominated the leftist perspective, interest in anarchism remained pale in left-wing publishing. While articles on anarchism were featured in the Yeni Ufuklar magazine published in the 1960s, Proudhon's book What Is Property? was translated into Turkish and published.

After the 1980 Turkish coup d'état, anarchism began to take its place in Turkey's political scene. In particular, anarchism gained a lot of traction in the Turkish diaspora in Germany, where many people had fled from the coup.

Launched in 1986, Kara magazine was taken as a turning point in terms of the anarchist movement in Turkey. Kara was published at a time when the mainstream Turkish left could not overcome the shock of the 1980 military coup d'état, defined itself as "libertarian" instead of "anarchist", due to the general perception of anarchy as chaos.

In addition to broader social movements, anarchist groups and publications formed in the late 1990s and early 2000s, such as Anarşist Kadınlar, Anarşist Komünist İnisiyatif, and Devrimci Anarşist Federasyon.

== See also ==
- Category:Turkish anarchists
- List of anarchist movements by region
- Anarchism in Armenia
- Anarchism in Bulgaria
- Anarchism in Syria
- Kurdistan Workers' Party
