= Anarchism in Cyprus =

Anarchism in Cyprus is considered to have emerged in the early 1980s in Limassol. Anarchists have been noted for advocating a "Cypriot" identity instead of Greek and Turkish identities, which are seen as bourgeois nationalism.

== History ==
=== 20th century ===
Anarchism spread into Cyprus in the early 1980s, as part of a wave of new political ideas that spread into the country following the 1974 Turkish invasion of Cyprus. The first known anarchist circle to exist in Cyprus emerged in 1981 was based around a group of friends and acquaintances in Limassol. Many left to study in Lyon, France and created the first Cypriot anarchist publication in 1982. In 1985, the first Cypriot self-managed social center was opened in Limassol and existed until 1990. In 1987, anarchists participated in the "right to be different" march that opposed the ban of motorcycle riding in the main streets of Limassol. In 1988, anarchists began organising against conscription in Cyprus, and supported conscientious objector Yiannis Parpas. Anarchists supported the reunification of Cyprus, and saw the competing Greek and Turkish nationalisms on the islands as distractions.

=== 21st century ===
In 2024 the Industrial Workers of the World (IWW) announced a regional organising committee in Cyprus, with organising going back to 2020.

== See also ==
- List of anarchist movements by region
- Anarchism in Greece
- Anarchism in Turkey
- Michael Paraskos, British anarchist writer of Cypriot descent
- Annan Plan

== Bibliography ==
- Pastellopoulos, Antonis (2017). "Cyprus Belongs to its Mouflons": Cypriot Anarchist Ideology in the Post-Partitioned Republic of Cyprus (1985 to 1994) (MA). University of Glasgow. doi:10.13140/RG.2.2.34099.66081.
- Pastellopoulos, Antonis (2022). "'Federation or Death': The Beginnings and Early Ideology of Cypriot Anarchism". Anarchist Studies. 30 (1): 58–82. doi:10.3898/AS.30.1.03. ISSN 0967-3393.
- Pastellopoulos, Antonis (2024). "'Asserting the dignity of our words': envisioning Cypriotness through local vernaculars". National Identities. 26 (4): 385–402. Bibcode:2024NatId..26..385P. doi:10.1080/14608944.2024.2359093. ISSN 1469-9907.
