= Peruvian Regional Workers' Federation =

Peruvian anarcho-syndicalist trade union federation active 1912–1925

- Federación Obrera Regional Peruana
- Founded: 1912
- Dissolved: 1925
- Location: Peru

The Peruvian Regional Workers' Federation (Spanish: Federación Obrera Regional Peruana, FORP) was an anarcho-syndicalist federation of unions, Guilds and resistance societies that was founded in 1912 in Peru. It was prominent in the fight to achieve the eight-hour workday.

== History ==
=== Background ===
At the end of the 19th century the first trade unions were founded in Peru, some with marked anarchist influences. However, anarchism remained largely unorganized and dispersed until the beginning of the 20th century. In 1904, Manuel Caracciolo Lévano, Delfín Lévano, Fidel García Gacitúa and Urmachea, all anarchist militants, founded a Bakers Union and organized the country's first strike. On May 1, 1905, they paid homage to the Chicago Martyrs for the first time. In 1907 the anarchists supported a dockers' strike in the port of El Callao, where the repression ended with the killing of Florencio Aliaga, the first death of the Peruvian labor movement.

In 1911, publication began of La Protesta newspaper, which promoted the anarcho-syndicalist model used by the Argentine Regional Workers' Federation (FORA). The Argentine trade union sent the Italian anarchist militants José Spagnoli and Antonio Gustinelli to help organize an anarchist federation in Peru.

=== Foundation ===
In 1912 the Peruvian Regional Workers' Federation was founded in Lima. It immediately launched a campaign for the eight-hour workday. The Federation was made up of several unions, including the Resistance Society of Biscuit Workers and Annexes, the Federation of Electricians, the "Estrella del Peru" Federation of Bakers, the Textile Union of Vitarte and the Proletarian Union of Santa Catalina. The Federation also received the support of specifically anarchist groups such as "Luz y Amor" and "Luchadores por la Verdad" and various libertarian publications.

In November 1912, the Local Union of Day Laborers began their first meetings in the Municipal Theater of El Callao, ending with a general assembly. The reformist "Confederation of Artisans Universal Union" which was opposed to direct action measures, also participated, coming into conflict with the anarchists. On December 15, a second assembly was held, and a campaign for the 8-hour day was initiated. On December 28, the list of demands was concluded during a third assembly.

=== The fight for the 8-hour day ===
On January 5, 1913, the General Union of Day Laborers demanded an 8-hour workday, salary increase and medical coverage for work accidents, giving a period of 24 hours before starting an indefinite general strike. On January 7 the strike broke out, after the union rejected the employer's proposal. The strike in El Callao was joined by gas operators, millers, printers, bakers and other unions.

On January 9, the President of Peru exhorted the workers to lift the strike and sent troops to regain order; the workers rejected the warrant and continued the strike. The company of the dock had to give in and granted the demands, with a 10% salary increase. This example was followed by other unions, which began their campaigns for the 8-hour workday throughout Peru. On January 12, FORP and the newspaper La Protesta organized a rally in El Callao to celebrate the victory and continue the struggle.

The fight for the 8-hour workday spread to other parts of the country, unleashing a wave of strikes. There were conflicts in Talara, Lagunitas, Loritos and Negritos. FORP also carried out a strike against Fox Duncan y Cía, for the reinstatement of 60 dismissed workers, which ended up reversing the dismissals.

The implementation of the 8-hour workday throughout the country was achieved in 1919. However, the first FORP was dissolved and replaced in December 1918 by the Local Workers Federation of Lima (FOLL).

=== The Subsistence Committee ===
The First World War generated great benefits for the Peruvian business class in the export of raw materials, but at the same time there was an increase in local prices due to speculation in basic products while workers' meager salaries did not increase. In April 1919 the anarchist unions began a campaign to lower the price of essential goods, creating the Committee for Cheaper Subsistence (Spanish: Comité Pro-Abaratamiento de las Subsistencias, CPAS).

On April 13, they published a manifesto demanding cheaper food and basic necessities, transportation and rent, but the government refused. On May 1 they declared a general strike, and on May 4 a demonstration was violently repressed in Lima. In El Callao there were serious clashes between the army and the workers, with a high number of deaths and looting. On April 26, at the premises of the Sons of the Sun Society, the police arrested the anarchist workers' leaders Nicolas Gutarra and Carlos Barba. Faced with this, the Committee decreed a strike for May 27. Adalberto Fonkén assumed the Secretariat but was later arrested. In Chosica there were also two deaths and several wounded.

The government imposed Martial Law, and raided private homes, anarchist and union premises; created a new anti-riot force called the Urban Guard, due to the reluctance of some troops to repress people. But the popular movement did not back down. On July 4, the Peruvian president José Pardo y Barreda was deposed by an uprising of the Army Commander Cnel. Álvarez and the candidate for the elections Augusto Leguía. The Committee for Cheaper Subsistence took advantage of the overthrow of Pardo to demand the freedom of imprisoned workers. On July 12 the detainees were released and there were popular demonstrations in celebration.

On July 4, Augusto B. Leguía took advantage of the situation to seize power amid popular enthusiasm. That same day, the CPAS occupied the CAUU premises to transform it into the headquarters of the second Peruvian Regional Workers Federation, established on July 8, 1919 on the basis of the principles of 1913.

— Joel Delhom

On July 22, a new union was derived from the CPAS: the Peruvian Regional Workers' Federation (FORP), an anarcho-syndicalist successor to the previous Federation. In its Declaration of Principles, the FORP declared that capitalists had monopolized profits, monopolized the market and reduced wages, that there was an absolute lack of morality and justice in society, and that this social injustice forced workers to seek means to achieve a better social state of integral freedom and economic equality. The Federation declared:

That it is international, it shelters in its bosom all the workers without distinction of race, sex, religion and nationality; it commemorates May 1 as a day of high protest by the international proletariat and affirms that: "The emancipation of the workers must be the work of the workers themselves".

=== Repression and decay ===
The Leguía government sought to modernize the Peruvian capitalist model, for which it promoted mediation in workers' conflicts. This measure was flatly rejected by the anarchists, who began to lose ground to the union reformists and socialists, who preferred "workers' policy" to direct action.

In the First Local Workers' Congress of Lima and El Callao, organized in April 1921 by the FORP, the question of the political action of the workers was raised. It seems that the anarchists managed to declare it incompatible with trade unionism but that they could not get the Congress to rule in favor of libertarian communism as the objective of organized workers. Socialist ideas, circulated since 1918, were already beginning to spread among the proletariat: the textile unions were the ones who advocated “workers' politics”.

— Joel Delhom

Members of the second Local Workers Federation of Lima (FOLL), adhered to Aprismo and Marxism, and finally tacitly broke with the unions and libertarian groups in 1925, by not inviting them to the May Day celebrations. In any case, FORP was dissolved in fact shortly after its relaunch, and efforts to relaunch it were unsuccessful.

The anarchist unions were not only limited to the urban world, but also participated in the rural movements, especially the sugar workers. In 1923, anarcho-syndicalists tried to form a Regional Federation of Indian Workers, but were quickly and vigorously repressed by the government.

During the 1920s, the repression by the government of President Augusto Leguía increased. Urmaechea, the director of the newspaper El Proletariado and other militants were forced into exile. After Leguía was overthrown, the Confederación General de Trabajadores del Perú (CGTP) was created by Aprists and Marxists, without including anarcho-syndicalists.

== Bibliography ==
- Cappelletti, Ángel (December 12, 2017). Anarchism in Latin America. AK Press. p. 440.

== See also ==
- Anarchism in Peru
- Manuel González Prada
