= Hüseyin Hilmi =

Hüseyin Hilmi may refer to:

- Hüseyin Hilmi Pasha, Ottoman statesman and administrator
- Hüseyin Hilmi Işık, Turkish Islamic scholar
- Hüseyin Hilmi the Socialist, also known as İştirakçı Hilmi, Ottoman socialist politician
