= Anarchism in Estonia =

Anarchism in Estonia dates back to the Russian Revolution and re-emerged after the Singing Revolution as part of the Estonian punk subculture. Estonian anarchists have been involved in political demonstrations, the conservationist movement and art collectives.

== History ==
In September 1917, young socialist activists in the city of Narva established a youth branch of the Estonian Social Democratic Workers' Party. Within a month, it came under the influence of anarchists and took the name of the Anarchist Communist Youth Association of Narva (Estonian: Narva Anarhistlik-Kommunistlik Noorte Ühing; NAKNU). In February 1918, anarchist delegates from Narva attended a congress of social-democratic youth associations in Tallinn, where they objected to the adoption of a Bolshevik programme by a proposed nationwide youth organisation. They were outvoted and left the congress, leaving it to establish the Northern Baltic Communist Youth League (PBKNL).

In the 1970s, the anarchist movement re-emerged in the Estonian Soviet Socialist Republic, as part of the Estonian punk subculture. The Singing Revolution, which brought an end to Soviet rule in the Baltic states and saw the return of freedom of expression, allowed for the complete re-organisation of the anarchist movement.

In the mid-1990s, the Anarchist League of Estonia (Estonian: Maavalla Anarhistlik Liit, MAL) was established by a group of individualist anarchists. The MAL was loosely organised, and did not have any rigid membership structure. Villu Tamme reported that, although he had heard of the organisation, he did not know what it did. On 30 June 1996, the first anarchist political demonstration in the country's history took place. The demonstration was organised by Tõnu Trubetsky, who clarified that while Estonian anarchists were anti-state, they were not specifically agitating against the Estonian state at that time and supported Estonian independence. The march consisted of roughly 100 people, who blocked roads and expressed hostility towards photojournalists, while being monitored by police. The demonstration ended at Von Krahl Theatre, where a punk concert was held by J.M.K.E. and other Estonian punk bands.

Some years later, the Estonian conservationist Jüri-Ott Salm established the Korporatsioon Fraternitas Anarhensis (English: Fraternitas Anarchensis Corporation', KFA), which gained a reputation for provocative political demonstrations by wearing toilet paper rolls as makeshift clothes and carrying a pig's head as a flag. Salm did not considered his idea of anarchism to be radical, as he only sought to expand the role of nonprofit organisations and mutual agreements in society.

On 22 February 2006, the libertarian socialist organisation PunaMust (English: Red-Black; PM) was established. On 6 June 2007, PunaMust activists were arrested in the German city of Rostock for blocking the highway towards Laage. After their release from police custody on 8 and 9 June, when neo-Nazis attempted to attack them outside the jail, they received protection from local residents.

In 2019, the Estonian anarchist art collective ZA/UM published the video game Disco Elysium, which achieved critical and commercial acclaim.

== See also ==
- Category:Estonian anarchists
- List of anarchist movements by region
- Socialism in Estonia
- Anarchism in Finland
- Anarchism in Latvia
- Anarchism in Russia
