= International group =

International group may refer to:

- International intergovernmental organization
- Category:United Nations coalitions and unofficial groups
- International Group of the Durruti Column, a unit of foreign volunteers in the Spanish Civil War
- International Marxist Group, a British Trotskyist organization
- International Group (Riga), an anarchist organization active around the time of the Russian revolution of 1905
