= Hüseyin Hilmi the Socialist =

Hüseyin Hilmi
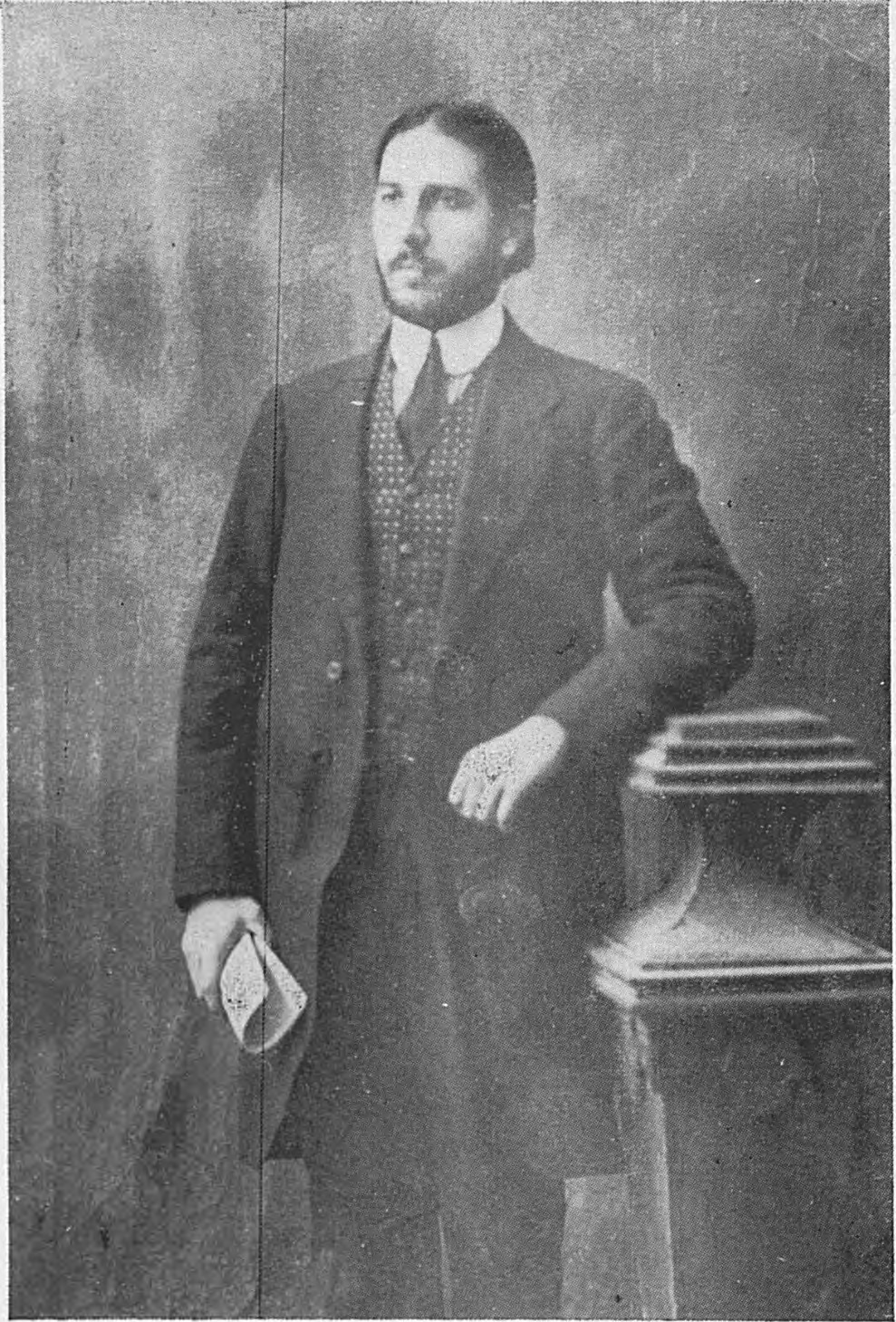
- Born: Hüseyin Hilmi; 1885; İzmir, Ottoman Empire
- Died: 16 November 1922 (aged 36–37); Valens Aqueduct, Istanbul, Ottoman Empire
- Occupation: Politician
- Known for: Ottoman Socialist Party; Socialist Party of Turkey; İştirak; Serbest İzmir

Signature
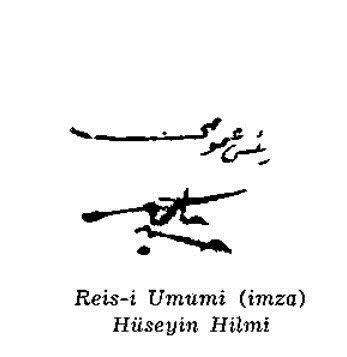

Hüseyin Hilmi Bey or İştirakçi (Socialist) Hilmi (1885 – 16 November 1922) was one of the early Turkish socialists. He was the founder and first General Chairman of the Ottoman Socialist Party and the Socialist Party of Turkey.

== Early years ==
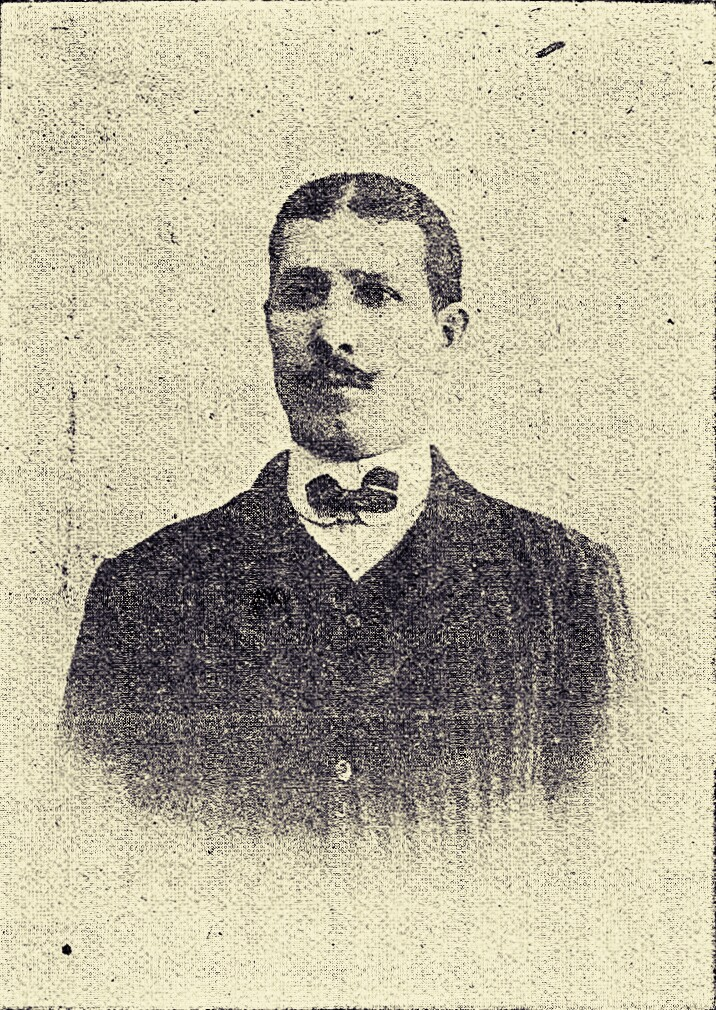
Photograph of Hüseyin Hilmi Bey which was published in İştirak.

Hüseyin Hilmi was born in İzmir. Hilmi's birth date is not clearly known. He worked as a civil servant in İzmir.

== Early political career ==
In İzmir, Hilmi published a newspaper named Serbest İzmir (Free İzmir or Liberal İzmir) in 1907. He was a supporter of the Ottoman Liberty Party and Mehmed Sabahaddin.

He received an inheritance from his father and went to Romania in the following years. In Romania, Hilmi was affected by labour movements and he became a socialist. Hilmi started publishing the İştirak on 13 February 1909. Thereafter, he was known with the epithet İştirak, and he was called İştirakçi Hilmi.

== Ottoman Socialist Party era ==
His weekly journal İştirak, launched in 1910, became a periodical for the defense of socialism among Ottoman intellectuals. İştirak introduced different branches of socialism to its readers. It was the first time that Marxism was advocated for in the Ottoman press. The Ottoman Socialist Party (Turkish: Osmanlı Sosyalist Fırkası, OSF) was founded by Hilmi, Namık Hasan, İbnül Tahir İsmail Faikt, Baha Tevfik and Hamit Suphi in August 1910.

According to Özgür Yılmaz,

While Hilmi and his associates attempted to reconcile socialism with Islam, their publications were also open to non-Muslim Ottoman citizens, reflecting a cosmopolitan outlook. Nevertheless, the initial socialist initiative soon shifted toward a more liberal oppositional stance.

In 1913, after the Committee of Union and Progress and the assassination of Mahmud Shevket Pasha, the party was closed down and Hilmi was exiled to Sinop Fortress Prison.

=== Ottoman Socialist Party in Paris Branch ===
The Paris branch of the OSF was founded by Doctor Refik Nevzat in the 1910s. After the closing of the party in Istanbul and the exiling of Hilmi, Refik Nevzat became the only representative of the party. He published three brochures for OSF named Siyaset-i Hazıra-i Meş'ume (Current Sinister Politics), Sosyalizm ve Rehber-i Amele (Socialism and Vanguard Workers) and Haraç Mezat Satıyoruz (Auctions Sell Tribute).

== Socialist Party of Turkey ==
After the Armistice of Mudros (Turkish: Mondros Mütakeresi) Hüseyin Hilmi returned to Istanbul. On 20 February 1325 (1919), the Socialist Party of Turkey (Turkish: Türkiye Sosyalist Fırkası, TSF) was founded by Hüseyin Hilmi and another 13 persons. (Note: Full list of founders: Hüseyin Hilmi (General chairman), Mustafa Fazıl Çun (general secretary), Namık Hasan, Mehmet Ali Bilgişin, Hasan Sadi Birkök, Doctor Refik Nevzat, Sadrettin Celal, Mustafa Kazım Kip from Van, Suphi Nuri İleri, Salih, Çopur Rıza Kiper, Rasim Şakir, Doctor İhsan Özgen, Mehmet Nurettin) Compared to the Ottoman Socialist Party, the Socialist Party of Turkey was positioned more to the left. Also TSF was a member of the Second International. The Party published the newspaper İdrak.

=== Strikes and TSF ===
In Istanbul, in 1920, the Ottoman worker class launched several strikes for occupation of the country, poor wages, and other reasons. In this atmosphere, TSF became popular among Istanbul workers. According to Yılmaz, Hilmi "gained renown for his leadership during significant labor strikes, including those involving tanners, dockworkers, and tramway employees."

== Second Congress and dissolution ==
On 31 October 1920 Party prepared a second congress. In this congress Hüseyin Hilmi became founder and unchangeable leader. (Note: Old Turkish: Fırkanın unvanı "Türkiye Sosyalist Fırkası" olup müessisi evveli Hüseyin Hilmi arkadaş lâyenazil ve daimi residir / English: Name of this party is "Socialist Party of Turkey" and our founder and unchangeable leader is Hüseyin Hilmi friend (comrade).) With this, the opposition tried to exile Hilmi and friends. But Hilmi and Hilmi's friends survived this opposition. With this, the opposition split from the party and founded the Independent Socialist Party. After the split, the party lost power.

== Third Congress and exiling of Hilmi ==
On 8 March 1922, the party prepared a third congress. In this congress, Hilmi and supporters were exiled from the party. The party was democratic again but it did not have any effect on the outcome. The party was dissolved.

== Death ==
On 16 November 1922, Hüseyin Hilmi was assassinated by a police officer named Ali Haydar. At first, Ali Haydar said Hilmi was trying to rape him so then he killed him. But he changed his statement afterwards and said Hilmi was killed by unknown men.
