= Anarchism in Ecuador =

Anarchism in Ecuador appeared at the end of the 19th century. At the beginning of the 20th century, it started to gain influence in sectors of organized workers and intellectuals.

== History ==
=== Origins ===
Alexei Páez in his book El anarquismo en el Ecuador reports that "at the end of the 19th century and the beginning of the 20th we find the first evidence of the existence of a group that was a friend of libertarian ideals". This was a group that published a newspaper called El Pabellón Rojo and its first edition appeared in Guayaquil in 1899. In this issue the authors defend French illegalism and the events protagonized by Ravachol and Sante Geronimo Caserio.

At the beginning of the 20th century, the Ecuadorian worker's movement was more combative in Guayaquil and the first attempts at anarchist propaganda appeared inside the workers movement. "It has been noted the existence of certain anarchist propaganda in the Jamaican workers movement who worked in the railroad in the beginning of the century". According to Paez "the railroad workers were the most combative alongside the carpenters and the workers on the cocoa fields, for the age, being later the cocoa workers and the railroad ones the best agitators for the founding of the anarcho-syndicalist Federación Regional de Trabajadores del Ecuador (FTRE).

In Guayaquil "In 1910, the Center of Social Studies...distributed La Protesta (Argentina), Solidarity (USA) and Claridad (Chile), in 1911 in the catalog of Liberia Española we could find texts of important libertarian theorists such as: Bakunin, Malatesta, Kropotkin, etc. These are acquired and employed for the establishment of anarchist groups which with the passage of time will continue to clarify their ideas. In 1920 there appears the Centro Gremial Sindicalista (CGS), editor of El Proletario." In El Proletario starts to write the important Ecuadorian anarchist "José Alejo Capelo Cabello, who with his example and tenacity collaborated with the first anarchist groups and trade unions.

In Quito there was "a newspaper called La Prensa which went on to be a part of the diaries chosen by Max Nettlau in his book Contribución a la Bibliografía Anarquista en América Latina, since it allowed some libertarian articles in its pages." Another important libertarian media dedicated space to the International Workers' Day was Tribuna Obrera, newspaper of "Ideas y Combate", published by the Asociación Gremial del Barrio del Astillero (AGA), an important place of anarchosyndicalist activity.

The anarchist ideals had support in middle-class intellectual sectors which are the first effective organizing sectors of anarchist and socialist positions. The thinker and labor leader Juan Elías Naula in Principios de Sociología Applicada manifests a profound admiration for the positions of Pierre-Joseph Proudhon. There also appeared the newspaper Alba Roja which was published by the group "Verbo y Acción" and it included Colón Serrano, Tomás Mateus and Francisco Illescas". On the arrival of anarchist positions in Ecuador "the presence of some foreign elements who lived in Ecuador" were considered important. So the Chilean Segundo Llanos was responsible for the edition of El Proletario. Also a Spanish sailor from his travels brought "newspapers such as La Protesta de Argentina, Solidarity of the IWW (Industrial Workers of the World) ... and even Spanish anarchist periodicals."

"Another tendency of the first Ecuadorian libertarian organizations was the organization of feminist groups." In Guayaquil there also appeared in 1910 the Center of Social Studies who participated in the International Workers' Association congresses of Berlin of 1922 and 1923.

=== The general strike of November 15, 1922, and the decline ===
"The original core of anarchism in Ecuador" converged around the group that published the newspaper El Proletario and it included Manuel Echeverría, Justo Cardenas, Narciso Véliz, Segundo Llanos and Alejo Capelo.

In the following years, a prominent tendency led by Narciso Véliz centered on the group "Hambre", which published El Hambriento. The group included Alberto Díaz, Juan Murillo, Jorge Briones, José Barcos, J. Villacís, Urcino Meza, Segundo Llanos, Máximo Varela and Aurelio Ramírez.

There were five groups active in the late 1920s: Redención, Tierra y Libertad, Solidaridad, Hambre, and Luz y Acción.

The Chilean Néstor Donoso was deported to his country after he was imprisoned. The group Luz y Acción decided to establish the Bloque Obrero Estudiantil Revolucionario so it could act in the universities.

In 1934, the anarchosyndicalists decide to reorganize the FTRE and after some failed attempts decide to create another syndicalist organization, the Unión Sindical de Trabajadores. In that organization were militants such as Alejo Capelo, Eusebio Moriel, M.E. López Concha, Able Gonzáles and Alberto Diaz. Around the time of the Spanish Civil War, the Ecuadorian anarchists manifested their solidarity with the CNT, which was a protagonist of the Spanish Revolution.

Alejo Capelo and Alejandro Atiencia collaborated in the Mexican anarchist newspaper Tierra y Libertad. Atiencia died in 1971 and Capelo in 1973.

== See also ==
- Category:Ecuadorian anarchists
- List of anarchist movements by region
- Anarchism in Peru

== Bibliography ==
- Páez, Alexei (1986). El anarquismo en el Ecuador. Colección popular "15 de noviembre" (in Spanish). Vol. 6. Quito: Corporación Editora Nacional. OCLC 466180185.
