= Anarchism in Albania =

Anarchism in Albania was introduced and began to be spread by Italian anarchists in the years before and after World War I, initially in the early 1910s by Italian volunteers who fought during the Albanian revolts against the Ottoman Empire, and later by Italians opposed to their country's military occupation of Albania that was effectively ended by the two-month Vlora War in the summer of 1920.

Native Albanian anarchists first organised themselves within the rising communist movement during the 1920s, but libertarian tendencies were eventually supplanted by Marxism–Leninism, which became the leading tendency by the 1930s. After World War II, a People's Republic was established by the communists under Enver Hoxha, which briefly implemented socialist self-management before drifting towards an anti-revisionist form of Marxism–Leninism.

When communist rule collapsed, the country went through rapid liberalization which caused an insurrection against the state, leading to renewed anarchist analysis of the situation in Albania and the rise of anarchist sympathies among Albanian migrants abroad.

== History ==
The Albanian National Awakening led to a rise in nationalism that advocated the independence of Albania from the Ottoman Empire, which had culminated in a series of revolts during the early 1910s. During the 1911 insurrection, Albanian rebels found support from a number of Italian volunteers, largely coming from the Italian anarchist movement, who participated in a guerrilla war against the Ottomans, before returning to Italy in the wake of the revolt's suppression. Despite the defeats, by the next year Albania had secured its independence, establishing the constitutional Principality of Albania. In the wake of World War I, there was a period of rising left-wing activity in Italy, during which Italian anarchists organised anti-militarist actions against the Italian occupation of Albania. In July 1920, anarchists led a mutiny of Italian troops in Ancona, which was suppressed, before launching an industrial campaign to prevent war material from being shipped to Albania. The sustained anti-militarist campaigns eventually forced the Italian army to withdraw from Albania in August 1920, restoring the independence of the Principality.

The Albanian socialist movement subsequently sprouted up during the early 1920s, when the first strikes started to break out in southern cities. Socialists participated in the June Revolution against Ahmet Zogu, (Note: The revolutionary leader Fan Noli had himself been accused being an anarchist, due to his libertarian interpretations of Hamlet, Don Quixote and An Enemy of the People, influenced in part by Friedrich Nietzsche, as well as his establishment of the Albanian Orthodox Church as an autocephalous organisation.) but after the revolt was defeated a number of socialist groups went into exile while others remained active in the country. The socialist groups within Albania largely didn't conform to the party line of the Communist International, with the communist group in Korçë coming under the influence of classical Marxists and anarcho-communists from Thessaloniki. In 1930, Ali Kelmendi returned from exile to enforce the adoption of Marxism–Leninism by the newly established Communist Party, causing a split within the movement that resulted in the suppression of the previously dominant Trotskyist and anarchist elements.

Following the victory of the National Liberation Movement during World War II, the People's Republic was established as a one-party state, under the rule of Enver Hoxha and the Labour Party. Despite having been constituted on a basis of Marxism-Leninism, the Albanian People's Republic deviated from the practices of the other Eastern Bloc regimes. Like the socialist self-management of neighboring Yugoslavia, Hoxha emphasised a decentralized economic system, restricted state bureaucracy and allowed leniency regarding its production quotas, at times even approaching a form of libertarian Marxism. (Note: Anarchistic tendencies within the Albanian economy were noted by the French agronomist René Dumont, while anarchist sympathies in Albanian culture were displayed through the publication of Albanian language translations of literature by libertarian and anarchist authors from Russia and the United States.) But in the wake of the Tito–Stalin split, the influence of Stalinism took hold by the early 1950s, with the implementation of forced collectivization, rapid industrialization and the establishment of a secret police. (Note: During the religious persecution that followed the implementation of state atheism, some of those imprisoned in Maliq came into contact with Christian anarchists that had opposed the state on religious grounds.) In reaction to De-Stalinization, Albanian deviations from the policies of the Soviet Union culminated in the Albanian–Soviet split, during which the Labour Party took an anti-revisionist line and adopted a form of Maoism, before itself splitting from the People's Republic of China following the rise of Deng Xiaoping. The result of this diplomatic isolation and the pursuit of autarky by Hoxhaist officials resulted in an economic crisis, which led to the fall of communism in 1991 and rapid economic liberalization under the newly elected Democratic Party.

The collapse of the pyramid schemes that dominated the Albanian economy of the 1990s sparked a civil war, during which dispossessed citizens armed themselves in rebellion against the state and established Salvation Committees to take over the functions of the state where it had collapsed. A journalist from Le Monde reported that: "The atmosphere in Gjirokastër is mad. The popular revolt has transformed itself into total anarchy, there is no police, no State, no rules. The city has become enthusiastic, has brightened up, got involved in the game of rebellion." Insurrectionary anarchists were quick to analyze the potential of the situation, which they believed could catalyze into a generalized insurrection against capitalism and the state. But the conflict subsided following foreign intervention and the subsequent election of the Socialist Party to power.

Around the time of the civil war, some migrants that left the country became involved with anarchist groups in Italy and Greece.

== See also ==
- List of anarchist movements by region
- Anarchism in Serbia

== Bibliography ==
- Acciai, Enrico (2020). Garibaldi's Radical Legacy: Traditions of War Volunteering in Southern Europe (1861–1945). Abingdon-on-Thames: Routledge. ISBN 978-0429816055. OCLC 1164823506.
- Anonymous (2000). Albania, Laboratory of Subversion. London: Elephant Editions. ISBN 1-870133-83-8. OCLC 993475568.
- Dalakoglou, Dimitrios K.; Halili, Rigels (2009). "Albania, Socialism". In Ness, Immanuel (ed.). The International Encyclopedia of Revolution and Protest. Oxford: John Wiley & Sons. pp. 1–5. doi:10.1002/9781405198073.wbierp0018. ISBN 978-1-4051-9807-3.
- Goodway, David (2013). For Anarchism. Routledge Library Editions: Anarchy. Routledge. ISBN 978-1135037550.
- Gran, Peter (1996). Beyond Eurocentrism: A New View of Modern World History. Syracuse University Press. ISBN 0815655444. OCLC 1273305794.
- Pllumi, Zef (2008). "Maliqi Swamp". Live to Tell: A True Story of Religious Persecution in Communist Albania. Vol. 1. iUniverse. ISBN 978-0595452989.
