= Anarchism in El Salvador =

Anarchism in El Salvador reached its peak during the labour movement of the 1920s, in which anarcho-syndicalists played a leading role. The movement was subsequently suppressed by the military dictatorship before experiencing a resurgence in the 21st century.

== History ==
Following the independence of El Salvador, power and property began to concentrate in the hands of an oligarchy, as the country's economy became centered around the production and export of coffee. In 1871, the ruling conservative government of Francisco Dueñas was overthrown by the liberal Santiago González, who completed the country's transformation into what has been described as a "coffee republic". Liberal rule was eventually consolidated by the military, with a liberal military junta holding power continuously and each president officially designating their successor.

=== Early anarcho-syndicalism in El Salvador ===
By this time, anarchism had already been spread to El Salvador by the French individualist anarchist Anselme Bellegarrigue, who had fled there from the repression of the Second French Empire, beginning the dissemination of anarchist ideas throughout the country during the latter half of the 19th century. In 1904, the lawyer Enrique Córdova published La perspectiva teórica del anarquismo, becoming the first known Salvadoran anarchist, himself inspired by the works of Peter Kropotkin and Leo Tolstoy. At the turn of the 20th century, an organized labour movement had arisen in El Salvador, forming an opposition to the country's ruling oligarchy, and anarcho-syndicalism began to develop among Salvadoran workers. Anarchist publications subsequently spread throughout the country, with the Ritos being first published in 1908 and the Renovación being first published in 1911.

Eventually, the tensions between the workers and oligarchs boiled over in 1913, when president Manuel Enrique Araujo was assassinated by coffee farmers. This assassination led to a period of one-party rule by the National Democratic Party, which continued the liberal military administration's policy of monoculture coffee production. It was in this political climate that Salvadoran anarchists formed the country's first trade unions and became key participants in the resistance movement against the oligarchy. The first Salvadoran Workers' Congress was held in Armenia, Sonsonate, in which two hundred delegates of workers' organizations agreed to the immediate objective of founding a national workers union, comprising all workers' unions of the time. Thus, anarcho-syndicalists founded the Unión Obrera Salvadoreña (UOS) in 1922 and the Federación Regional de Trabajadores de El Salvador (FRTS) in 1924, although the latter became predominantly Marxist in 1929. This caused a split within the FRTS, after which the Centro Sindical Libertario was established in 1930, becoming the first specifically anarchist organization in El Salvador.

When the Great Depression brought with it a collapse in coffee prices, the country's economy became unable to sustain itself through its one main industry. In the aftermath, the country's first free and fair elections were held, in which the Labor Party candidate Arturo Araujo was elected as President of El Salvador. Although he had progressive ideals, having promised food, clothing, work and housing to every Salvadoran, Araujo was himself a landowner and took power in the midst of massive labor and student strikes. He declared martial law to suppress the strikes, but the military soon turned on him too. Supported by the country's oligarchy, Araujo was overthrown in a coup d'état led by the Civic Directory, which established a military dictatorship.

=== Under the military dictatorship ===
Under the rule of Maximiliano Hernández Martínez and the far-right National Pro Patria Party began to repress the labour movement. When the Communist Party won several seats during the 1932 legislative election, the government cancelled the results of the election. This culminated in the 1932 Salvadoran peasant uprising, driven by communists, anarcho-syndicalists and indigenous peasants. However, the revolt was brutally suppressed by the government, killing tens of thousands of people, most of whom were indigenous Pipil people. As a result, the Salvadoran anarchist movement, including the Centro Sindical Libertario, was largely dissolved or driven underground. The government subsequently pursued a brutal campaign of repression until 1944, when Salvadoran students organized a general strike which resulted in the overthrow of the Martinez regime.

However, the overthrow of Martínez did not bring the end of the military dictatorship, which continued to rule the country under a series of right-wing parties, supported by the United States for its anti-communist stance. In the 1970s, the left-wing was revitalized by the student movement, which saw the Revolutionary Left Movement bringing together Trotskyists, anarchists and Marxists which supported armed struggle against the regime. The military dictatorship was finally overthrown in the 1979 Salvadoran coup d'état, which brought the moderate Revolutionary Government Junta to power, overseeing the transition to democracy. But this also ignited the Salvadoran Civil War, in which the Farabundo Martí National Liberation Front brought together a broad coalition of revolutionary socialists, syndicalists and anarchists to fight against the US-backed government. Tens of thousands of people died during the war and an unknown number were forcibly disappeared. With the ratification of the Chapultepec Peace Accords in 1992, the FMLN disarmed itself and the country's left-wing organizations were once against legalized. Soon after the FMLN became one of the country's largest political parties, forming the Salvadoran government from 2009 to 2019.

=== The contemporary anarchist movement ===
Since the end of the civil war, the Salvadoran anarchist movement slowly began to re-emerge, as counter-cultural Salvadoran youth movements took up anarchism to criticize the country's politics, from outside any political parties. In 2002, the hardcore punk scene of San Salvador brought punks, skinheads and straight edge people together into the Salvadoran Anarchist Movement (MAS). The organization published pamphlets and fanzines at punk concerts, but soon began to make their presence felt in the streets. On May 1, 2003, the MAS paraded through the streets of the capital as part of the May Day celebrations. In 2004, members of the MAS and the veganarchist Célula de Liberación Animal (CLA) came together to form the Libertarian Action Collective (KAL), dedicated to the publication of anarchist and vegan ideas through literature, music and direct action. Other anarchist organizations also began to emerge around the capital, including the Anarchist Social Action Collective (KASA), the Salvadoran Anarchist Revolutionary Circle (CRAS) and the Kolectivo Resistencia Libertaria (KRL). Acción Directa (AD) also arose as a result of a libertarian split from the FMLN's youth bloc. From 2006, efforts were made to strengthen ties between the various anarchist organizations in El Salvador. This culminated with the above groups coming together to participate in a coordinated large-scale action at the May Day celebrations of 2008, under the banner of the Coordinadora Anarquista (CA). The work continued in an attempt to unify and support the various groups as part of a horizontal organization.

In 2015, the Agrupación Conciencia Anarquista was established and began publishing the anarchist magazine Aurora, forming the Salvadoran chapter of the Anarchist Federation of Central America and the Caribbean (FACC).

== See also ==
- List of anarchist movements by region
- Anarchism in Guatemala

== Bibliography ==
- Cappelletti, Angel J. (2018). Anarchism in Latin America. Translated by Gabirel Palmer-Fernández. Edinburgh: AK Press. p. 219. ISBN 9781849352826. OCLC 1044939183.
