= List of anarchist movements by region =

This is a list of anarchist movements by region, both geographical and/or political.

== Africa ==
- Algeria
- Angola
- Chad
- Egypt
- Eswatini (Swaziland)
- Ethiopia
- Guinea-Bissau
- Kenya
- Libya
- Madagascar
- Morocco
- Mozambique
- Nigeria
- Senegal
- Sierra Leone
- South Africa
- Sudan
- Tanzania
- Tunisia
- Uganda
- Zambia
- Zimbabwe

== Asia ==
- Armenia
- Azerbaijan
- Bangladesh
- China
- Cyprus
- Georgia
- Hong Kong
- India
- Indonesia
- Iran
- Israel
- Japan
- Korea
- Malaysia
- Mongolia
- Philippines
- Russia
- Singapore
- Syria
- Taiwan
- Timor-Leste
- Turkey
- Vietnam

== Europe ==
- Albania
- Andorra
- Armenia
- Austria
- Azerbaijan
- Belarus
- Belgium
- Bosnia and Herzegovina
- Bulgaria
- Croatia
- Cyprus
- Czech Republic
- Denmark
- Estonia
- Finland
- France
- Georgia
- Germany
- Greece
- Hungary
- Iceland
- Ireland
- Italy
- Latvia
- Monaco
- Netherlands
- Norway
- Poland
- Portugal
- Romania
- Russia
- Serbia
- Spain
- Sweden
- Switzerland
- Turkey
- Ukraine
- United Kingdom

== North America ==
- Canada
- Costa Rica
- Cuba
- Dominican Republic
- El Salvador
- Guatemala
- Mexico
- Nicaragua
- Panama
- Puerto Rico
- United States
  - Individualist anarchism

== Oceania ==
- Australia
- New Zealand
- Timor-Leste

== South America ==
- Argentina
- Bolivia
- Brazil
- Chile
- Colombia
- Ecuador
- French Guiana
- Paraguay
- Peru
- Uruguay
- Venezuela
