= Anarchism in Monaco =

This is a short history of anarchism in Monaco, primarily in the late 19th century and early 20th century. Monaco, a principality formerly under the absolute rule of the House of Grimaldi and a constitutional monarchy since 1911, is located on the French Riviera in Western Europe. The city-state and microstate is bordered exclusively by France and the Mediterranean Sea.

== History ==
Amid a period of militant upheaval, in March 1894 Prime Minister Francesco Crispi of Italy responded to a request from the government of Monaco to help the Principality monitor political radicals. Crispi, a former insurrectionist himself, sent a confidential informant to watch over the community of Italian anarchists residing in the country. All expenses were paid for by Monaco. The same year, the Prime Minister had deployed the army and declared a state of siege in Sicily to put down the partially anarchist-led Fasci Siciliani, crushing an anarchist solidarity revolt in Lunigiana along the way. Only months later in June anarchists unsuccessfully attempted to shoot Crispi himself, successfully assassinating President Marie François Sadi Carnot.

The prominent individualist anarchist Benjamin Tucker moved from the United States first to France and then to Monaco, after a 1908 fire in his New York City bookstore saw him lose both uninsured printing equipment and his 30-year stock of books and pamphlets. At the time of the fire his partner Pearl Johnson – 25 years his junior – was pregnant with their daughter, Oriole Tucker. Tucker moved to Monaco, where his daughter grew up, to better make use of the income from his invested inheritance. He spent much of the rest of his life in the city-state, mostly in almost complete political retirement.

Tucker died in Monaco in 1939, in the company of his family. His daughter, Oriole, reported, "Father's attitude towards communism never changed one whit, nor about religion... In his last months he called in the French housekeeper. 'I want her,' he said, 'to be a witness that on my death bed I'm not recanting. I do not believe in God!"

Léo Ferré (1916–1993) was born and, partially, schooled in Monaco. A Monegasque poet, composer and a dynamic and controversial live performer, he became a very prominent protest singer in France, releasing some forty albums and many successful singles throughout his career. A staunch anarchist, Ferré's often heavily political songs mixed revolt with love and melancholy. While he spent much of his life away from his birthplace, he returned to live in Monaco several times, before finally being buried there in 1993.

== See also ==
- Category:Monegasque anarchists
- List of anarchist movements by region
- Anarchism in France
- Anarchism in Italy
- History of Monaco
