= Anarchism in Costa Rica =

Anarchism in Costa Rica emerged in the 1890s, when it first came to the attention of the country's ruling elites, including the Catholic Church.

== History ==
In the 1900s, a number of anarchist-leaning newspapers were established in Costa Rica.

During the 1905 bakers' strike for the eight-hour day, some of the strike leaders included anarcho-syndicalists from Spain, while the Costa Rican leaders were themselves imprisoned in Alajuela.

In 1909, after the assassination of Francesc Ferrer, anarchist groups organized demonstrations in San José. The newly founded Centro de Estudios Sociales Germinal attracted the participation of intellectuals, such as Joaquín García Monge. José María Zeledón Brenes founded the periodical Renovación on January 15, 1911, publishing more than seventy issues in its lifespan, many of which showed anarchist tendencies. The French language anarchist newspaper Le Semeur was later published in Santiago de Puriscal. The Alajuela publication El Sol, though not anarchist itself, frequently welcomed contributions from people with anarchist tendencies. In 1913, the Costa Rican workers' movement first celebrated May Day organized by the Centro de Estudios Sociales Germinal and many of the country's trade unions. The Confederación General de Trabajadores was subsequently formed, and organized throughout the 1910s. From 1917, the anarchist movement experienced a severe repression by the military dictatorship of Federico Tinoco Granados.

In 1926, a libertarian group was formed in San José for the purpose of direct action.

== See also ==
- Category:Costa Rican anarchists
- List of anarchist movements by region
- Anarchism in Nicaragua
- Anarchism in Panama

== Bibliography ==
- Cappelletti, Angel J. (2018). Anarchism in Latin America. Translated by Gabirel Palmer-Fernández. Edinburgh: AK Press. pp. 217–218. ISBN 9781849352826. OCLC 1044939183.
