= César Lévano =

Peruvian journalist, writer, and poet (1926–2019)

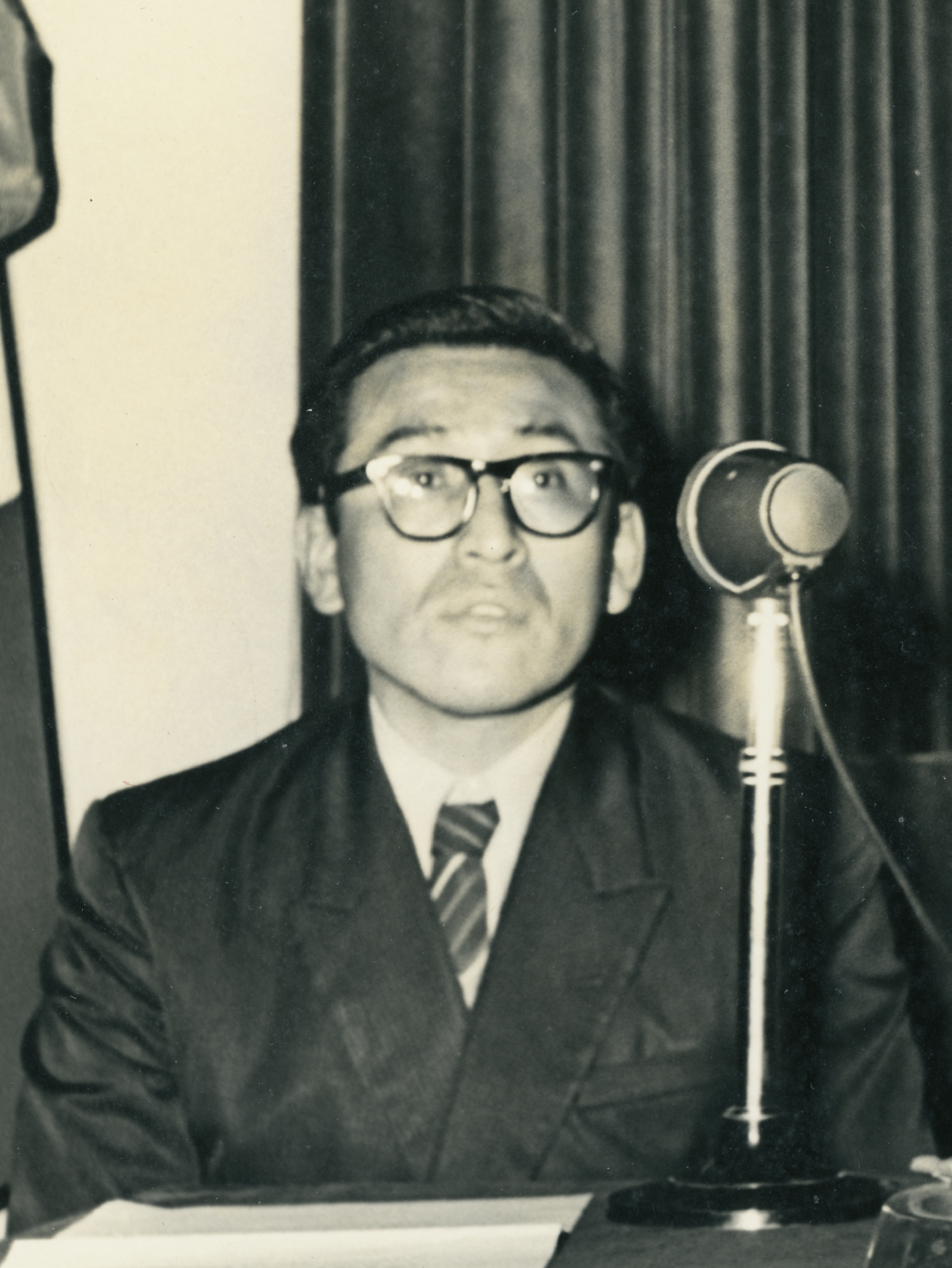
- Born: Edmundo Dante Lévano La Rosa; 11 December 1926; Lima, Peru
- Died: 22 March 2019 (aged 92); Lima, Peru
- Education: National University of San Marcos
- Occupations: Journalist, writer, poet and teacher

Edmundo Dante Lévano La Rosa, also known as César Lévano (December 11, 1926 – March 22, 2019) was a Peruvian intellectual, journalist, writer, teacher and poet. He was director of the Peruvian newspaper Perfil, which became a weekly newspaper, and was also a retired professor at the National University of San Marcos (UNMSM).

== Biography ==
Guided by the example of Delfín Lévano, his father, and Manuel Caracciolo Lévano, his grandfather; both leaders, founders and cultural promoters of the proletarian movements of the early twentieth century; César Lévano always had a deep approach to culture and grew up in an environment where social causes were defended. His father and his grandfather, self-taught journalists, like him; they created different bodies of struggle with anarchist ideas. The inclination for journalism was acquired as a child when, at the age of nine, he started selling newspapers.

In 1945 he launched into political militancy in the Communist Youth, where he edited the magazine Estrella Roja. He founded in La Oroya the newspaper El Metalúrgico (1948), organ of the Metallurgical Workers Union of a corporation of Cerro de Pasco; from 1956 to 1960 he worked at the France-Presse News Agency as a translator and website; He went through the newsrooms of Marka, La República and Sí; in 1975, he directed La jornada, a work supplement for the newspaper La Prensa; he was director of the newspaper Última Hora (1991); panelist of the television political program Pulso and associate website of the magazine Caretas.

For much of his life he suffered persecution and imprisonment for defending his ideas. He was held for several years in the Sixth, the Panóptico, the criminal island El Frontón during the military governments of Manuel A. Odría and Francisco Morales Bermúdez.

In 2002, he was decorated by the Peruvian Government with the Order of Merit for Distinguished Services in the Grade of Grand Cross.

In 2005, he was recognized by the Constitutional Court for his defense of Human rights.

In 2011, she received the Annual Human Rights Award from the National Coordinator of Human rights.

In 2014 he assumed the management of Diario UNO, previously called "La Primera", and resigned in September 2018 due to lack of payments.

Lévano La Rosa was a professor at the National University of San Marcos, a position he held since 1980. He was, in turn, director of the School of Communications of said center of studies and journalistic director of the newspaper Perfil.

César Lévano was the author of a repertoire of waltzes, yaravíes, huainos and even a flamenco rumba, several of these compositions, in collaboration with maestros such as Manuel Acosta Ojeda and the composer and pianist Víctor Merino.

== Works ==
- La utopía libertaria en el Perú
- Arguedas. Un sentimiento trágico de la vida (essay)
- La verdadera historia de la lucha por las ocho horas en el Perú
