= Anarchism in Nicaragua =

Anarchism in Nicaragua emerged during the United States occupation of Nicaragua, when the workers' movement was first organized against the interests of foreign capital. This led to a synthesis of Latin American anarchism with the goals of national liberation, which influenced the early Sandinista movement.

== History ==
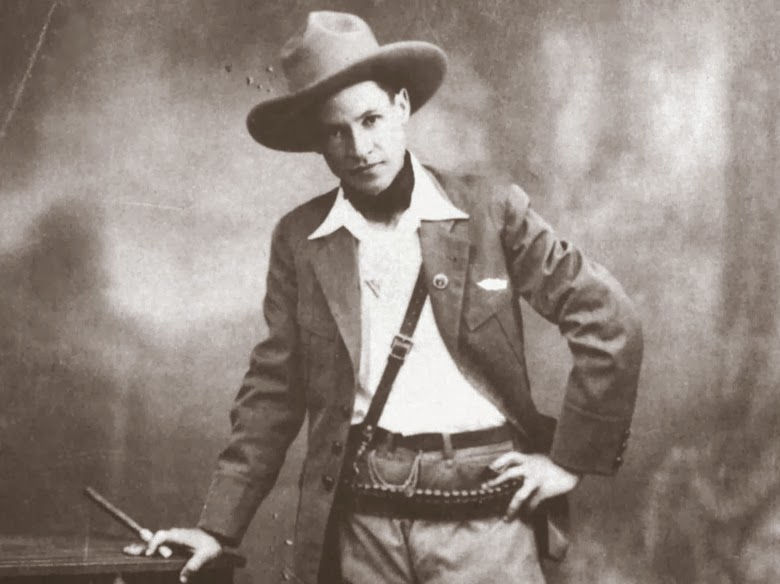
Augusto Sandino, Nicaraguan revolutionary leader and anarcho-syndicalist sympathizer.

In 1918, several of Nicaragua's mutual societies came together to found the Federación Obrera Nicaragüense. Until then, the Conservative and Liberal parties were primarily in control of the country's trade unions. Although no major anarcho-syndicalist unions were established in the country, in 1919, foreign libertarians were active in the stevedore strikes in Corinto.

Militant workers formed the Grupo Socialista and published a newspaper El Socialista, which criticized intellectual opportunism in the Federación. Although the group displayed militant tendencies, it was largely made up of reformists and social democrats. Salomón de la Selva attempted to integrate the Federación Obrera Nicarangüense into the AFL-affiliated Confederación Obrera Panamericana. Although Sofonías Salvatierra was critical of such a relationship with American trade unionism, he was ultimately opposed to revolutionary internationalism.

The Nicaraguan revolutionary leader Augusto Sandino developed a sympathy for anarchism during his time in the Mexican Revolution. After meeting some Spanish anarchists, he even adopted their red and black colours for the design of his own flag. According to Sandino, “only the workers and peasants will go all the way, only their organized force will attain victory” for the social revolution. Upon returning to Nicaragua, Sandino actively fought against the United States occupation, eventually forcing their withdrawal.

After the assassination of Sandino, Anastasio Somoza García seized power from the elected government of Juan Bautista Sacasa and established a right-wing dictatorship. The workers' movement was suppressed by the Nationalist Liberal government, until the Nicaraguan Revolution finally overthrew Somoza regime. Wide-scale social reforms were implemented throughout the country, including the redistribution of land, vaccination campaigns, free healthcare and literacy campaigns which reduced illiteracy from 80 percent to 12 percent. But after the 2006 re-election of Daniel Ortega, rising authoritarianism and political corruption in the country, anarchists and other Sandinistas began to turn against the FSLN government. This culminated in the 2018–2020 Nicaraguan protests, in which anarchists have participated.

== See also ==
- List of anarchist movements by region
- Anarchism in Costa Rica
- Sandinista ideology

== Bibliography ==
- Cappelletti, Angel J. (2018). Anarchism in Latin America. Translated by Gabirel Palmer-Fernández. Edinburgh: AK Press. pp. 220–221. ISBN 9781849352826. OCLC 1044939183.
- Gutiérrez Mayorga, Gustavo (1983). "Historia del movimiento obrero en Nicaragua 1900–1977". In González Casanova (ed.). Historia del movimiento obrero en América Latina. Colección Antología de América Latina (in Spanish). Mexico: Editorial Katún. ISBN 9684300484. OCLC 11559006.
