= Anarchism in Peru =

Anarchism in Peru emerged from the Peruvian trade union movement during the late 19th century and the first two decades of the 20th century.

== History ==
The beginnings of anarchism in Peru can be traced back to 1870. In the craftsmen's guilds at the end of the 19th century, a certain anarchist orientation began to gain influence. In 1904 the first anarchist organizations began to appear, with forming the "Star of Perú" Federation of Bakers (FOPEP), founded by the libertarian militants Fidel García Gacitúa, Urmachea and Manuel Caracciolo Lévano; that year they carried out their first strike. On May 1, 1905, a commemorative event for the Haymarket Martyrs was held for the first time. In 1907, Anarchists participated in strikes at the port of Callao, the repression that followed took the life of Florencio Aliaga. In 1906 the newspaper Humanity appeared in Lima, and in 1910 it published Free Pages by the Francisco Ferrer Rationalist Center. In 1907, the brothers Lévano, Romilio Quesada, Luis Felipe Grillo and the publishing group of "Humanity" founded the "Primero de Mayo" Center for Social Studies. The anarchist Julio Reynaga (1841–1923), one of the organizers of the Trujillo sugar workers. In this city, an anarchist group was formed by some Italian immigrants like Inocencio Lombardozzi. Reynaga was editor of "El Jornalero", whose offices were located in the premises of the "Unión y Energía" Center for Social Studies. During these years, the main libertarian newspapers, in addition to those mentioned, were El Ariete (Arequipa), La Abeja (Chiclayo), La Antorcha and El Rebelde (Trujillo), El Hambriento and Simiente Roja, and Los Parias (Lima), directed by González Prada between 1904 and 1906.

In 1911, the first general strike in the textile industry was launched by anarchists. Then, in 1912, the Peruvian Regional Workers' Federation (FORP) arose from the anarcho-syndicalist movement. In 1913 the anarchists participated in the general strike called by the Union of Day Laborers, with the aim of achieving the 8-hour workday. Among the participating groups were the Peruvian Regional Workers Federation and its affiliated guilds and resistance societies, "Luchadores por la Verdad" (led by the bricklayer Abraham Guerrero), "Luz y Amor" (Callao) and the publishing group of the newspaper "La Protesta", the main anarchist newspaper in Peru (founded by A. Guerrero in 1911, edited until 1926). The 8-hour day was granted by the José Pardo y Barreda government in January 1919. Months later, the "Pro-cheapening of Subsistence Committee" was created, led by the joiner Nicolás Gutarra, the purpose of which was to lower the prices of food, clothing, transportation, rent, and taxes. After the Leguía coup and the liberation of labor leaders from prison, in July 1919 the Peruvian Regional Workers' Federation was re-constituted with a declaration of anarcho-syndicalist principles. This stage of Peruvian anarchism was strongly influenced by the experiences of the Argentine Regional Workers' Federation (FORA), and of Italian and Spanish libertarian immigrants.

In those years, some libertarian workers met regularly at the Lévano house (located in La Victoria District, Lima) where they "spoke like doctors. Backing up their opinions, they displayed their knowledge as they quoted Peter Kropotkin, Mikhail Bakunin, Anselmo Lorenzo and Errico Malatesta". There were also some students who were sympathetic to libertarian ideas, such as Juan Manuel Carreño and Erasmo Roca.

Among the prominent militants of the time were Manuel C. Lévano, Delfín Lévano, Carlos Barba, Nicolás Gutarra, Pedro Cisneros, Adalberto Fonkén, Eulogio Otazú, Christian Dam, and Manuel González Prada. González Prada was the author of important and influential texts: Free Pages (1894) and Hours of Struggle (1908).

González Prada was concerned with the ethnic-class relationship, exposing the exploitation of indigenous people and the different manifestations of "racial" discrimination. This remarkable writer, admired by Mariátegui, who took his indigenista flags and combined his peasant activity with various tasks in the labor movement.

— Luis Vitale

In the 1910s and 1920s, in the town of Vitarte (east of Lima), there was a solid anarchist nucleus, linked to the workers at the local textile factory. One of the first propagandists of anarchist ideas and a member of the La Protesta group was the spinner called Juan Híjar Salazar. Other anarchists from Vitarte included Celso Soto, Gumercindo Calderón, Antonio Patrón, Noé Salcedo, Fernando Borjas, Esther del Solar, Miguel Pasquel, Augustina Araníbar and A. Fonkén. Julio Portocarrero, a prominent socialist trade unionist, was prone to libertarian ideas in his early youth, as he distributed the newspaper "La Protesta" for several years at the Vitarte factory. An important cultural tradition, promoted by libertarians in Vitarte, was the so-called Plant Festival, which emerged in the early 1920s, with the aim of becoming a proletarian alternative to the Christian holiday of Christmas. The first Feast of the Plant was held on December 25, 1921. The Libertarian Women's Center was one of the organizations that participated, along with several delegations.

During the 1920s, the Union of Civil Construction Workers emerged, publishing El Nivel and El Obrero Constructor. During these years, government repression was felt strongly, closing printing presses and stores, in addition to murdering many anarchists. In Trujillo, anarcho-syndicalists participated in a workers' uprising, which would be capitalized on by the American Revolutionary Popular Alliance (APRA). The decline of anarchism due to repression caused anarchists to lose positions in the labor movement. Some activists were deported, in the case of Gutarra, who was deported to Colombia in the early 1920s, and then on to Panama in 1924.

In the Anarchist Federation of Peru was formed by some of the militants who continued the libertarian tradition gathered. They republished "La Protesta" for 2 years and edited documents until the 1960s, when it disappeared entirely. Teobaldo Cayetano was a baker worker who belonged to the "Arm and brain", a libertarian cell of the "Star of Peru" . He wrote in La Protesta, during the 1940s. In 1957, he was appointed defense secretary of the "La Estrella" Huancayo Society of Bakers. In the early 1960s, he was elected regional secretary of Lima by this union.

The Institute of Studies and Research of Cooperatives and Communities (Indeicoc) was a center of libertarian inspiration, which came into operation in the first half of the 70s. It claimed self-management and libertarian socialism as pillars of a free society: “Self-management or democratic management of the means of production, where the worker acquires a double condition: producer and manager of the company. He ceases to be a salaried worker and becomes a free and associated producer." Members of Indeicoc included Jaime Llosa Larrabure, Víctor Gutiérrez Saco and Gerardo Cárdenas.

Libertarian activity reappeared with some notoriety towards the end of the 1980s linked to the underground music movement of Lima, which acquired a gradual politicization and radicalization of its positions. The repressive climate generated by antiterrorist laws limited the growth and evolution of these anarchist groups, which were striving to differentiate themselves from the guerrilla left. In the early 1990s, anarchist groups less linked to the underground music scene began to appear. In Lima the anarcho-syndicalist groups "Proletarian Autonomy" and "Collectivization" emerged.

In 2001, after many years, an anarchist newspaper "Disobedience" began to be printed in Lima, which continues to appear to this day, maintaining a perspective of critical anarchism. The Libertarian Workshop was formed, which brought together activists from different generations, including Víctor Gutiérrez, Ch. Zénder and L. Villavicencio. In 2008, the bimonthly newspaper Humanity was founded by five libertarian activists. It took a combative and analytical style, within the guidelines of classical anarchism. Members of Humanity later founded the newspaper Direct Action, with an anarcho-communist tendency.

Within the especifist and platformist current is the Libertarian Socialist Union, a continuation of the Qhispikay Llaqta and Estrella Negra groups. Within the autonomist current is the "Anarchist Group La Protesta", the "Arteria Libertaria Collective", the "Yacta Runa Autonomous Collective" and the "Active Minority Collective" from Arequipa. Within the anarchopunk and counterculture spectrum there is the Anarkopunk Social Center, Anarchopunk Resistance, Anarchopunk Youth Collective of Tacna in Struggle, the band Asteroids 500. mg, Axión Anarkopunk and the bands Generación Perdida, Autonomía, Feria Libertaria Kallejera and Men and Women in Our Anarchist Struggle.

== See also ==
- Category:Peruvian anarchists
- List of anarchist movements by region
- Communism in Peru
