= Anarchism in French Guiana =

Anarchism in French Guiana has a short, and little recorded, history. The only continental territory in Latin America to remain under European control into the 21st century, Guiana has not seen the same political developments as most countries in the region. Still, anarchism has existed to some degree, mainly through the presence of political prisoners deported to the colony. In the modern era, anarchism has had a minor presence in the Guianan political milieu.

== History ==
Located on the northern Atlantic coast of South America and inhabited by Amerindians indigenous peoples, Guiana was first encountered by Europeans in 1498 when Christopher Columbus reached it, naming the region the "Land of Pariahs". Several attempts to colonize Guiana were made by European states, all of them failing, until the late 17th century when France somewhat successfully colonized the region. While it switched hands many times during the next few centuries, it eventually returned to the French.

The history of French Guiana since colonization can be said to largely have been defined by imprisonment, escape, and rebellion. Many slaves brought from Africa in the region escaped between the mid-17th century and onwards, forming independent maroon communities together with indigenous tribes. Contemporary communities of escaped slaves in neighboring Brazil, such as Palmares (1605–1694) and its leader Zumbi, have sometimes been upheld by modern anarchists as examples of early anti-colonialism, decentralization, and democracy.

These communities of free escaped slaves often waged war against the French colonial settlements. Additionally, slave revolts were relatively frequent. A prominent was one in 1796, when riots broke out after plantation owners refused to obey the abolition of slavery enacted by the French First Republic. After the execution of the same man that had carried out said abolition, Maximilien de Robespierre, in 1794, 193 Jacobin supporters - political radicals whose involvement in the French Revolution and one-time alliance with the revolutionary sans-culottes had an immense impact on the later development of revolutionary and libertarian thought - were deported to Guiana. They were the first of many political prisoners to come. When in 1797 Jean-Charles Pichegru and others were sent to the colony as prisoners, they found that only 54 of the deportees were still alive, the rest had either succumbed to tropical diseases or escaped.

Another slave revolt came in 1804, when Napoleon reintroduced slavery in France's American colonies. After the French Revolution of 1848, in which early anarchists like Pierre-Joseph Proudhon and Joseph Déjacque participated, slavery was again abolished, leading to a massive increase in the maroon population.

From the mid-19th century, French Guiana became one of France's primary penal colonies, seeing a massive influx of both criminal and political prisoners over the next century. One early prisoner was Louis Charles Delescluze, arrested and deported in 1853, who after his release in 1859 became associated with the International Workingmen's Association, later becoming a prominent leader of the revolutionary libertarian socialist Paris Commune. The Communard, who was killed on the barricades, wrote an account of his imprisonment in Guiana; De Paris à Cayenne, Journal d'un transporté.

Most political prisoners were placed on the Îles du Salut, especially the notorious Devil's Island, which was active as a prison between 1852 and 1953. It became controversial for its reputation of harshness and brutality. Violence between prisoners was common, tropical diseases were rife, and guards were often corrupt. While most prominently known for its connection to the Dreyfus affair, many French anarchists were imprisoned on the island as well, during the late 19th and early 20th century. Many of them were illegalists, engaging in propaganda of the deed and individual reclamation.

The most prominent anarchist imprisoned in French Guiana was the illegalist Clément Duval (1850–1935), who - unable to work after being wounded in the Franco-Prussian War - turned to theft. Duval, a member of the Panther of Batignolles, was first sentenced to death for burglary (and stabbing the policeman arresting him repeatedly), but later had the sentence commuted to hard labor on Devil's Island. He spent the next 14 years in prison, attempting escape over 20 times. In April 1901, he succeeded and fled to New York City, where he lived until the age of 85. His memoirs were published in 1929, titled Outrage: An Anarchist Memoir of the Penal Colony.

In 1894, an anarchist-led prison revolt broke out on Devil's Island. The troubles began in September, when a jailer killed the anarchist Francois Briens. On 21 October, the jailer was stabbed to death. In the following manhunt, Achille Charles Simon - an accomplice of the executed bomber Ravachol - was shot after being found hiding, as were the anarchists Marsevin, Lebault and Léon-Jules Léauthier (the later of which had been sentenced for trying to stab the Serbian Minister in Paris to death). In the following chaos, the guards killed numerous anarchist prisoners, among them Dervaux, Boesie, Garnier, Benoit Chevenet, Edouard Aubin Marpaux, Mattei, Maxime Lebeau, Mazarquil, Henri Pierre Meyrveis, Auguste Alfred Faugoux, Thiervoz, and Bernard Mamert. Others died long after, due to the rough conditions and torture, among them Mamaire and Anthelme Girier.

Other anarchist prisoners in French Guiana included Marius Jacob, an illegalist burglar who spent fourteen years in Cayenne and was one of the inspirations for the author Maurice Leblanc's character Arsène Lupin, the Bonnot Gang members Jean De Boe (who after his escape in 1922 fled to Brussels, becoming a noted anarcho-syndicalist) and Eugène Dieudonné (who was pardoned, after escaping prison in December 1926), and Paul Roussenq, who spent a whole twenty years in Guiana on charges of military insubordination, later visiting the Soviet Union (becoming a firm critic of it) and being interned by Vichy France.

=== Contemporary ===
French Guiana remains part of France, now as an overseas department and region, not a separate territory. It remains the only territory in continental Latin America that have not been decolonized by its associated European power, and has little autonomy from France itself. The region's political situation is dominated by Guianese Socialist Party, in addition to other left-wing parties like the Democratic Forces of Guiana, Walwari, and the Decolonization and Social Emancipation Movement. In 2004 the French anarcho-communist movement Alternative libertaire established a local group in French Guiana. Alternative Libertaire Guyane is engaged in primarily anti-colonialism, but also labor struggles, immigrant rights, housing issues, and so on.

== See also ==
- List of anarchist movements by region
