= Anarchism in Panama =

Anarchism in Panama began as an organized movement among immigrant workers, brought to the country to work on the numerous megaprojects throughout its history. From the mid-19th century onward, Panama's labor history was shaped by waves of migrant workers drawn by major infrastructure projects such as the trans-isthmus railroad and the construction of the Panama Canal Zone.

Early strikes for better wages and conditions began during the railroad era, with anarcho-syndicalist ideas introduced by European and Caribbean workers during the French and later American canal efforts. Following Panama's independence from Colombia in 1903, anarchists established transnational networks that drove labor organizing in the Canal Zone, despite government attempts to suppress activism.

Anarchist newspapers and affinity groups emerged alongside continued labor actions, culminating in the founding of the Sindicato General de Trabajadores in 1924 and the involvement of anarchists in broader socialist and communist movements by the 1930s.

== History ==
The trans-isthmus railroad was built between 1850 and 1855, and the French attempted to build a canal in the 1880s. Between the 1870s and 1930s, Panama was part of a transnational anarchist network that included cities such as Havana, New York City, Mexico City, St. Louis, Tampa, and Los Angeles. Print culture and activist networks linked these locations, and anarchist activity in Panama developed local characteristics distinct from those in other centers.

The U.S.-led canal construction from 1904 to 1914 brought large numbers of workers from Europe, Asia, and the Caribbean to Panama. Strikes for higher wages and better conditions began during the railroad era. The movement in Panama shared resources, information, and solidarity with other Caribbean, Mexican, and US anarchist groups from the 1890s until at least the 1920s, reflecting an internationalist outlook and regular collaboration across borders.

=== 1880-1889 ===
During the 1880s, approximately 20,000 workers arrived mainly from Spain, France, and Italy. These migrant workers brought class consciousness and anarcho-syndicalist ideas to Panama, especially Spanish libertarian workers. Anarchists in Panama led several successful strikes during the French canal phase. Poor working conditions led to sickness and high mortality among workers, fueling further labor unrest.

In a table listing the geographic origins of donations to Italian anarchist periodicals, a small portion of donations to the periodical Volontà written by Errico Malatesta came from Panama during the period 1889–1915.

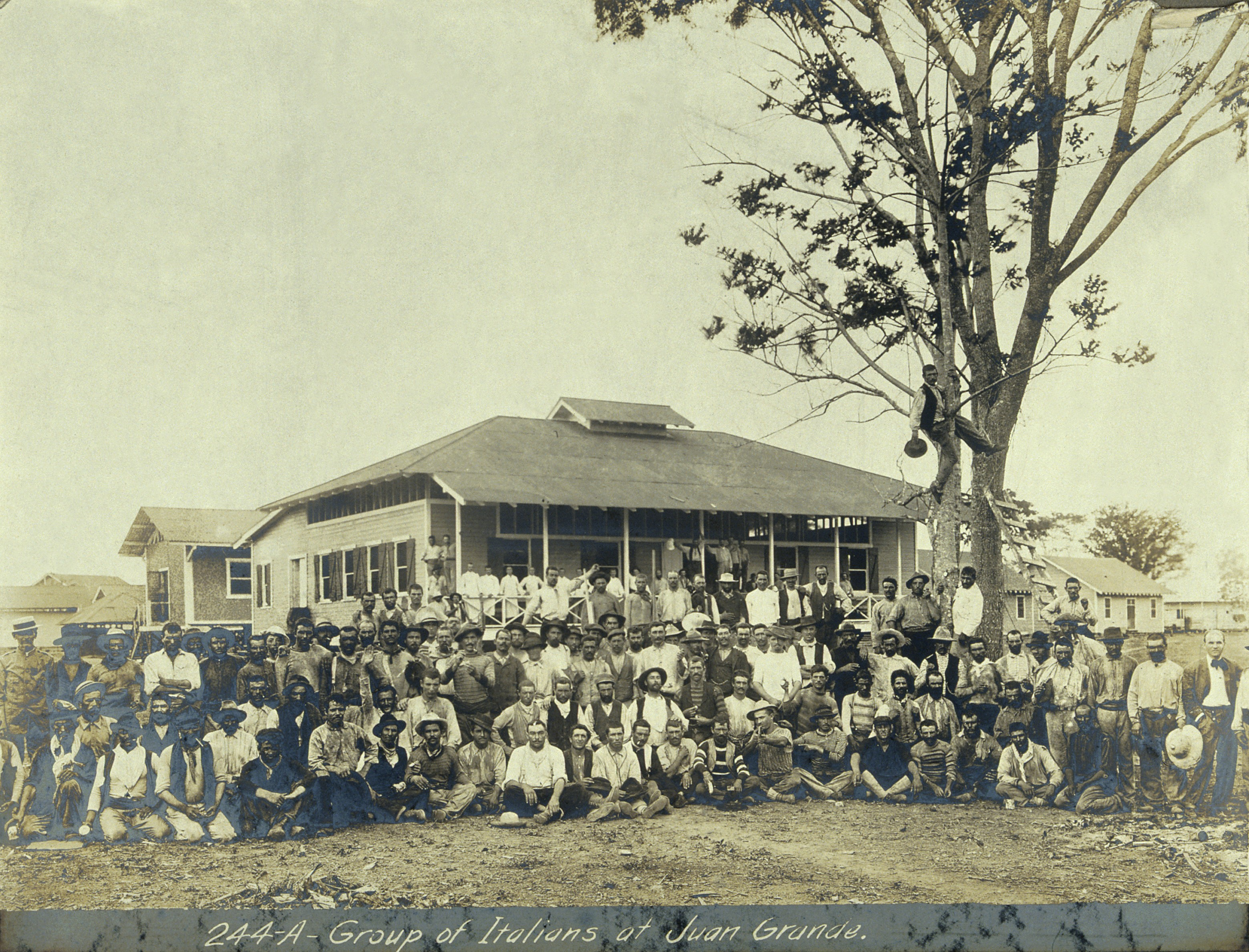
Italian Panama Canal construction workers, Juan Grande (1910)

=== 1903–1914 ===
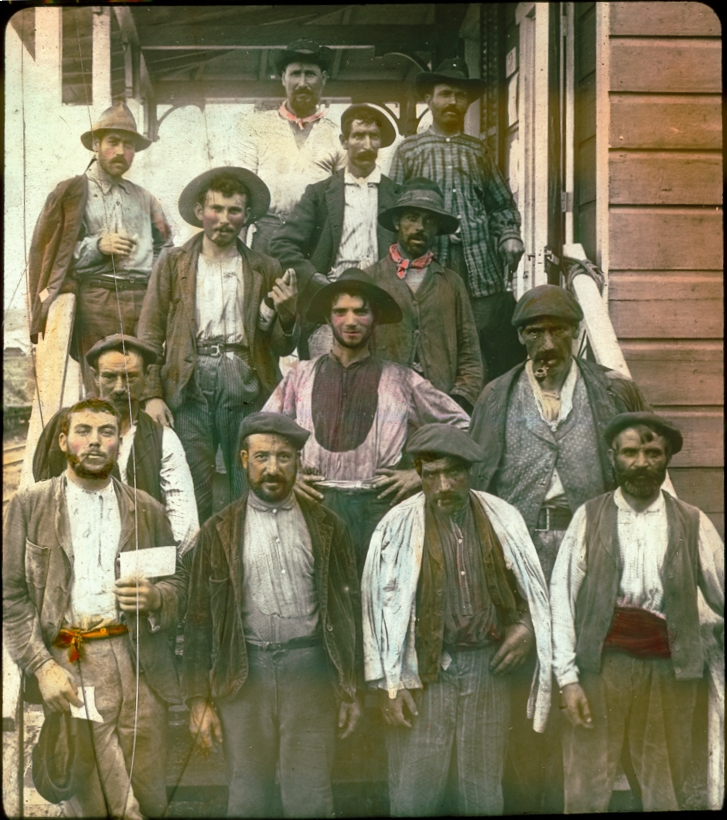
Spanish laborers on the Panama Canal in early 1900s

Anarchist activity in Panama was shaped by the Secession of Panama from Colombia in 1903, which was closely tied to US interests in building the canal.

Communication and organizing among anarchists was facilitated by Spanish-language zines, published locally, but most notably through the Havana-based weekly ¡Tierra!. The broader context of labor organization in Latin America, and Panama, included interconnected networks and solidarities across borders, with anarchist and syndicalist organizations such as the Industrial Workers of the World (IWW) contributing to the spread of radical labor activism across the continent.

Foreign anarchists first drove Anarchist labor activity in Panama during the construction of the Panama Canal Zone. During the U.S. construction of the Panama Canal, around 40,000 workers arrived, especially from Central America, Jamaica, and the broader Caribbean. These workers bring class consciousness and anarcho-syndicalist ideas to Panama.

The subsequent movement involved both native Panamanians and foreign-born anarchists. These anarchists were part of broader transnational networks that linked labor and political activists across Latin America and the Atlantic world. Anarchists built transnational networks that linked the Canal Zone to Cuba and Spain, establishing international ties for organization and support.

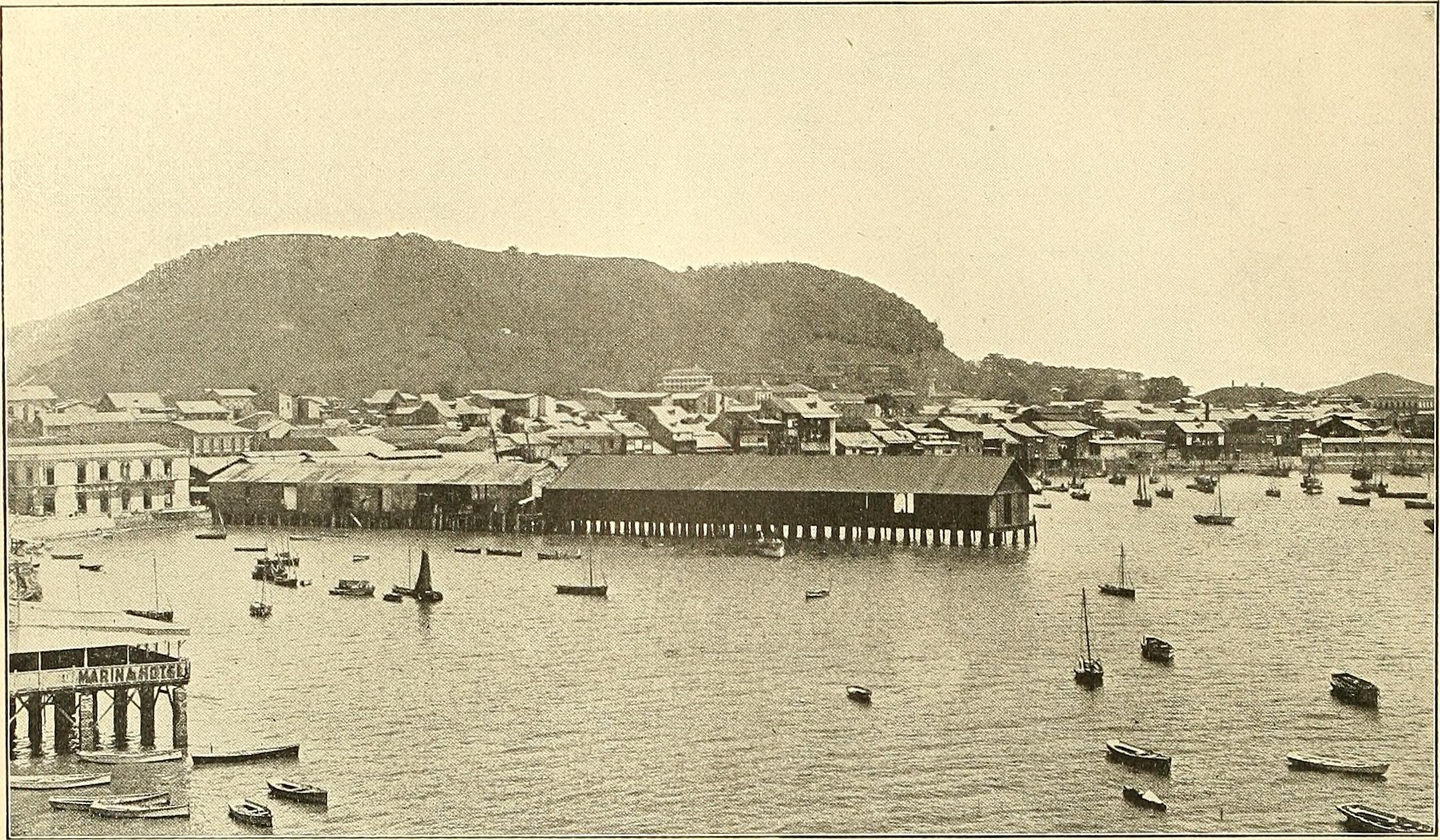
Panama City from the Bay; Ancon Hill in the background (1913)

Anarchists in the Panama Canal Zone focused on building class consciousness among canal workers. They developed short-term projects such as newspapers and printing presses, aiming for long-term influence. Anarchists in Panama formed part of larger transnational movements resisting both colonialism and emerging nation-states.

In response to growing labor activism, the Panamanian government created Article 5 of Law 72 in 1904, which barred anarchists from immigrating to the country. General George Whitefield Davis, governor of the Canal Zone, actively worked to suppress anarchist activity in the Zone. However, labor actions persisted, such as a 1907 strike by 2,000 workers.

=== 1924–1930 ===
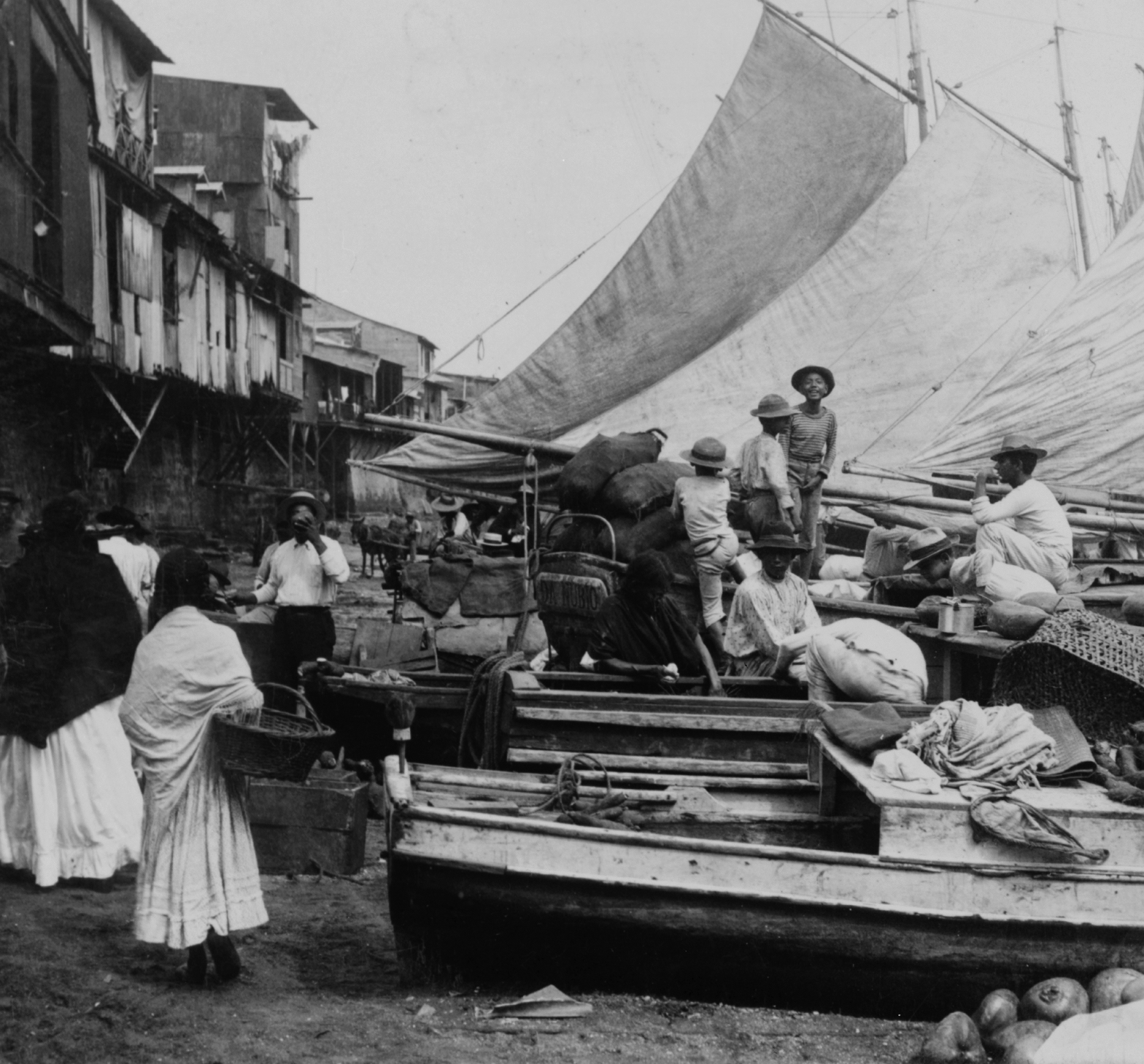
Market boats, Panama City, Panama by H.C. White, ca. 1907

The Sindicato General de Trabajadores (General Workers' Union), a predominantly though not entirely anarcho-syndicalist organization, was founded in 1924. It became Panama's first centralized labor body and gained thousands of members. Some of its founders include Spaniards José María and Martín Blásques de Pedro, the Pole Sara Gratz, and the Peruvian Esteban M. Pavletich. Panamanian members include anarchists and Marxists such as Eliseo Echevez and Domingo Turner.

Anarchists active on the fringes of the Federación Obrera, formed with the support of liberal president Belisario Porras, helped organize the 1925 Tenant Strike from September to October of that year. The tenants’ strike played a significant role in shaping Panama's leftist and labor movements.

While Black West Indian workers formed a large part of the workforce in Panama and lived in the poorer districts of Panama City and Colón, they were not heavily involved in the strike. This was due to longstanding divisions between West Indian and Hispanic workers, recent unsuccessful labor actions led by West Indians in the Canal Zone, and the fact that the Hispanic organizers of the strike did not prioritize gaining West Indian support. These factors created a longstanding rift between West Indians and the larger labor movement, contributing to persistent separation between national independence efforts and campaigns against racial discrimination in Panama.

By the end of the 1920s, the influence of these anarchist networks began to decline, as political changes and the rise of mass politics and Communist parties shifted the landscape of radical organizing in the Americas. Eliseo Echevez and Domingo Turner became founders of the Partido Comunista, and Diógenes de la Rosa became the leader of the Partido Socialista in 1930.

== Anarchist print media in Panama ==
Communication and organizing among anarchists was facilitated by Spanish-language zines, published locally, but most notably through the Havana-based weekly ¡Tierra! The newspaper El Unico, an anarchist publication, was launched in Colón by a group influenced by Stirner and Nietzschean ideas in 1911.

== See also ==
- List of anarchist movements by region
- Anarchism in Colombia
- Anarchism in Costa Rica
