= Socialism in Estonia =

Socialism in Estonia was practiced in Estonia during the Soviet occupation.

One of the only political parties in Estonia to follow some form of Socialism is the Left Alliance of Estonia.

== See also ==
- History of Estonia
- Left-wing politics
- List of political parties in Estonia
- Politics of Estonia
