= Ottoman Socialist Party =

Ottoman Socialist Party Osmanlı Sosyalist Fırkası
- Last Leader: Hüseyin Hilmi
- Founded: 1910
- Dissolved: 1913
- Headquarters: Istanbul
- Ideology: Socialism
- Political position: Left-wing

The Ottoman Socialist Party (Turkish: Osmanlı Sosyalist Fırkası, OSF) was the first Turkish socialist political party, founded in the Ottoman Empire in 1910. It went into exile in 1913, but was relaunched as the Turkish Socialist Party (Turkish: Türkiye Sosyalist Fırkası, TSF) in 1919.

== History ==
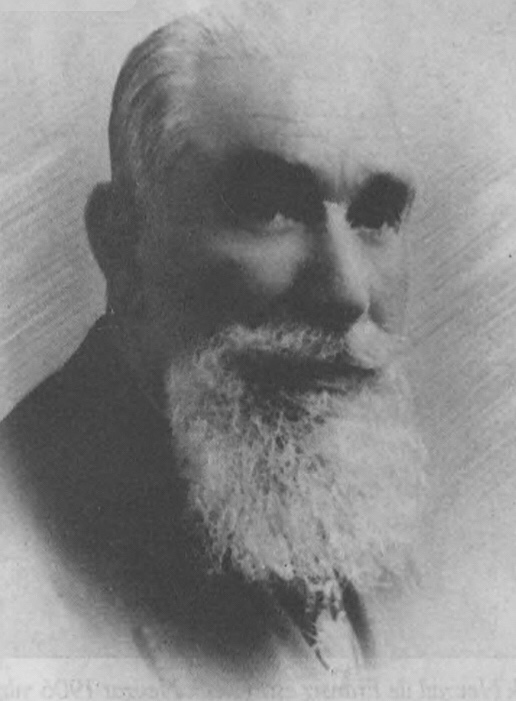
Refik Nevzat, socialist politician during the Second Constitutional Era.

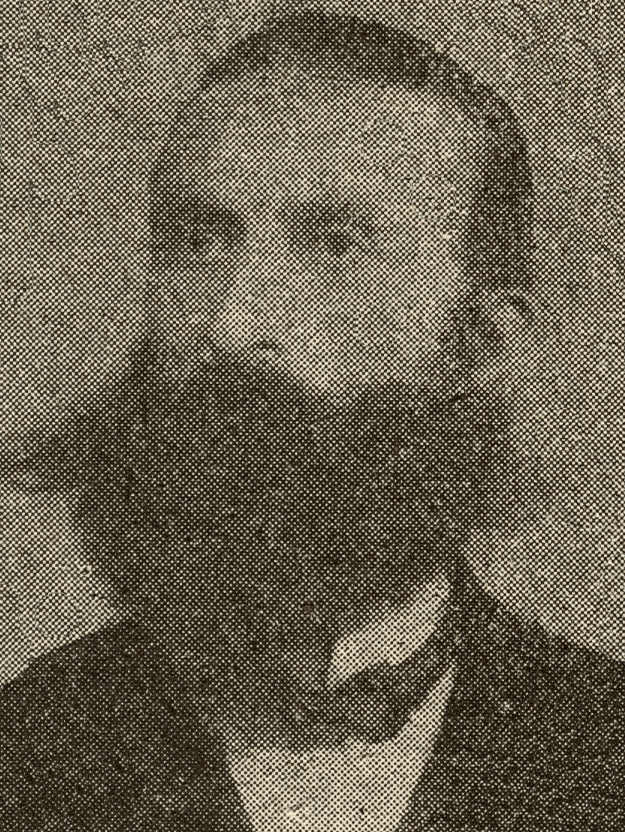
Avnullah Kâzımî, one of the early socialists.

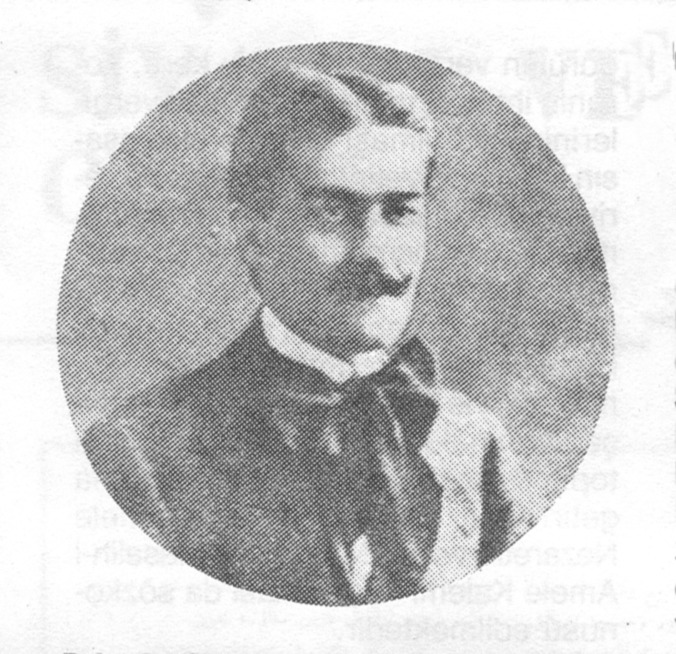
Baha Tevfik

Before the formation of the party, socialist parties or groupings only existed among the Ottoman Empire's minorities, with the first socialist party being the Istanbul-based Armenian Social Democrat Hunchakian Party. Additional socialist organizations included the following: the predominantly Jewish Socialist Workers' Federation, the Bulgarian section of the People's Federative Party, as well as the Bulgarian narrow socialists. Additionally, within Istanbul there was the Greek Socialist Center, the Armenian Revolutionary Federation. As Ezel Kural Shaw has written in her History of the Ottoman Empire and modern Turkey, the Ottoman Socialist Party "gained its main support from the Armenian and Bulgarian groups in the Parliament".

The Ottoman Socialist Party was actually not a real political party in the modern sense, but rather a group of intellectuals. After the Young Turks had taken stringent measures against the opposition, the party began to support the opposition. OSF aimed to defend the basic values of the Constitutional Monarchy, freedom of the press and association, and human rights against the Committee of Union and Progress. In September 1911, an international organization of the party, led by Dr. Refik Nevzat, was founded in Paris, which should establish contacts with the international workers' movement. Although the activities of this group have remained limited, Hüseyin Hilmi succeeded, however, in having a correspondence with Jean Jaurès. But the party failed to be admitted to the Second International.

After the 1913 Ottoman coup d'état of the Young Turks, the opposition began to be massively repressed, difficult times began for the Ottoman Socialist Party. Hüseyin Hilmi was arrested the same year and remained either in prison or in exile until 1918. This amounted practically to the end of the party but in 1919, it was succeeded by the Socialist Party of Turkey, which was also founded by Hüseyin Hilmi.

== Socialist Party of Turkey ==
Socialist Party of Turkey Türkiye Sosyalist Fırkası
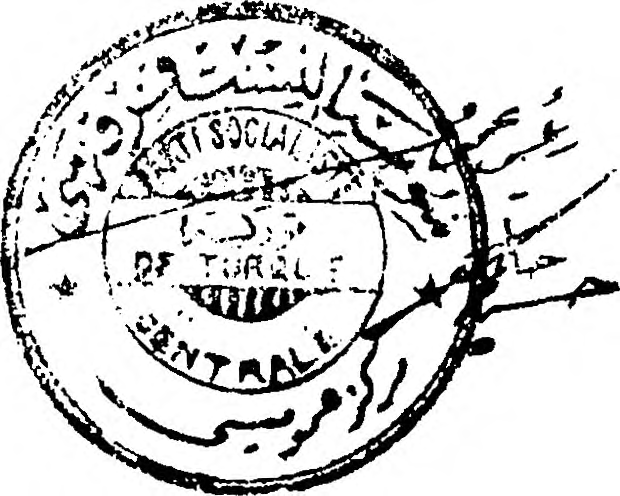
- Last Leader: Hüseyin Hilmi
- Founded: 1919
- Dissolved: 1922
- Headquarters: Istanbul
- Ideology: Socialism
- Political position: Left-wing

The Socialist Party of Turkey is the successor of the Ottoman Socialist Party. Its chairman was the journalist Hüseyin Hilmi, who was on either exile or prison after the 1913 Ottoman coup d'état. Hilmi returned to Istanbul after World War I and founded the TSF.

He also founded the socialist weekly İştirak on 26 February 1919. (Note: born in Izmir, deceased on November 15, 1922 in Istanbul, he was nicknamed "İştirakçı Hilmi", "Socialist Hilmi", "İştirak" was the Ottoman Turkish language term for socialist, as in Arabic إشتراكي ishtirākiyy) Hilmi Other leading members were Avnullah Kâzımî, Namık Hasan, Pertev, Tevfik, İbnil Tahir, İsmail Faik, Baha Tevfik, Hamid Suphi. After the fall of the Young Turks regime, the party was reactivated in 1919 under the leadership of Hüseyin Hilmi and Mustafa Fazıl under the name of Socialist Party of Turkey. The party had contact from the beginning with the Second International, it was also represented at its congresses in Bern, Amsterdam and Geneva. There was also a Workers' International Association in Istanbul, mainly made up of minorities, Greeks, Bulgarians and Jews.

Although the founding in September 1919 by Dr. Şefik Hüsnü (Deymer) of the Turkish Workers and Peasants Socialist Party (Turkish: Türkiye İşçi ve Çiftçi Sosyalist Fırkası), leaning towards the Third International, led many members to leave the TSF, it successfully led the great strikes' wave of 1920. In a short time the party, which basically organized trade union activities, won a lot of popularity among the workers. On the other hand, Hüseyin Hilmi successfully exploited the conflicts between the British garrison headquarters in Istanbul and the French firms. Therefore, he could get the support from British authorities in Istanbul.

After the conflicts between the French and English had been mitigated and the party had become a threat to international firms, the TSF lost its power. The firms founded and supported competing labor organizations such as Amele Siyanet Cemiyeti and forced the workers to become affiliated to these organizations. The compulsory membership in 1922 was one of the main reasons for the great defeat of the strike of streetcar workers. After this defeat, Hüseyin Hilmi was arrested and the party was dissolved.

Splinter party Independent Socialist Party (Turkish: Müstakil Sosyalist Fırkası) reported no success.

The Socialist Party of Turkey was organized almost only in Istanbul. It maintained distance from the Kemalists who led a national movement against the occupation of Anatolia, and the Communists who tried to unite the workers organizations. The TSF was more a trade union than a political party.
