= Independent Socialist Party (Turkey) =

Turkish political party

Independent Socialist Party مستقل سوسياليست فرقه سی, Müstakil Sosyalist Fırkası
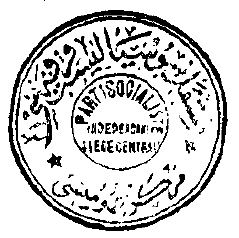
- Leader: Rasim Sakir
- Founded: 1922
- Split from: Turkish Socialist Party
- Headquarters: Istanbul
- Ideology: Socialism
- Political position: Left-wing
- International affiliation: Labour and Socialist International

The Independent Socialist Party (Turkish: مستقل سوسياليست فرقه سی, Müstakil Sosyalist Fırkası) was a political party in Turkey. The party was founded in the summer of 1922 by the trade unionist leader Rasim Sakir, after a split from the Socialist Party of Turkey.

The party was a member of the Labour and Socialist International.
