= Baha Tevfik =

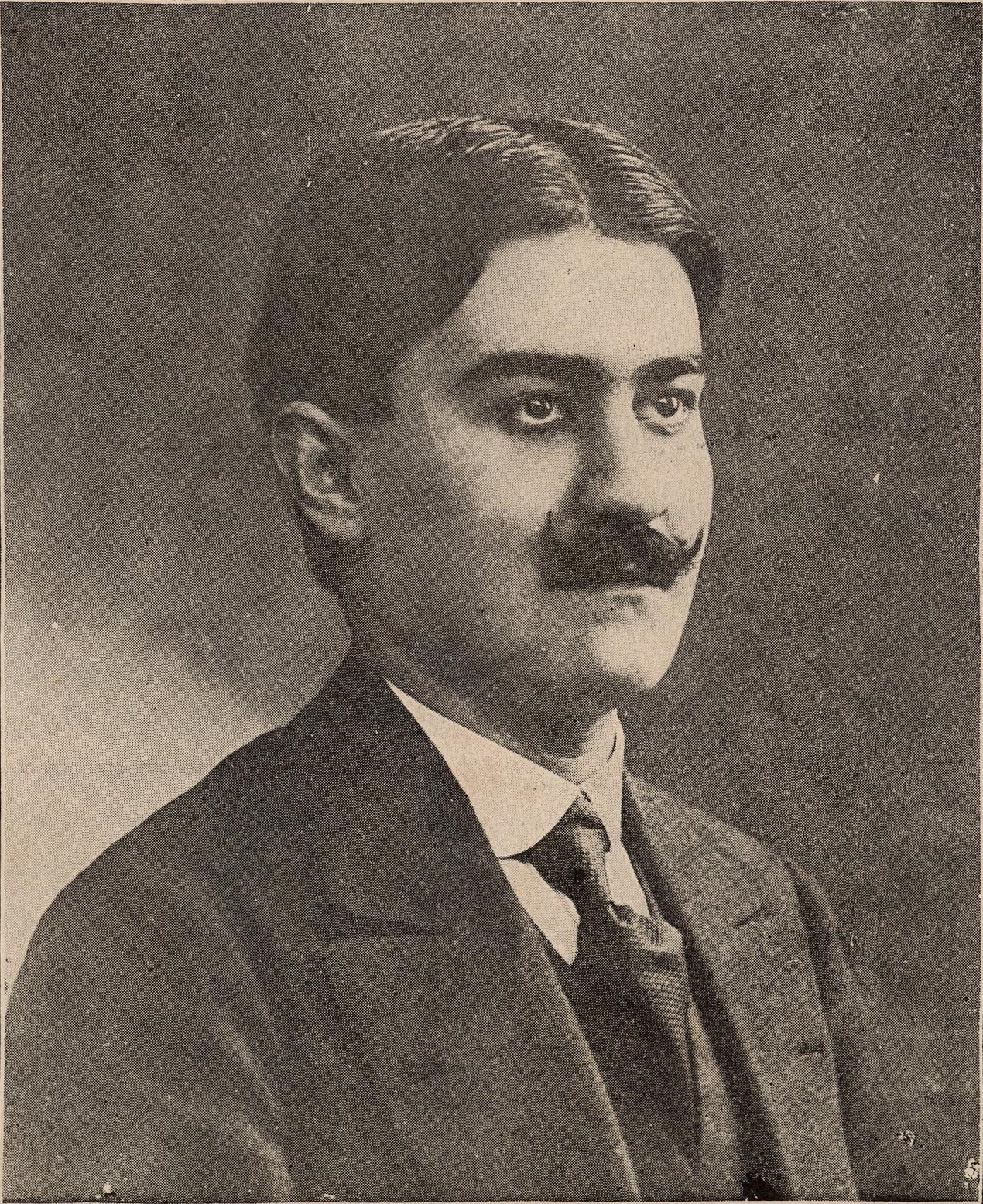
- Born: 13 April 1884; İzmir, Ottoman Empire
- Died: 15 May 1914 (aged 30); Constantinople, Ottoman Empire
- Occupations: Author, philosopher, anarchist
- Writing career
- Notable work: Felsefe-i ferd

Baha Tevfik (13 April 1884 – 15 May 1914) was a Turkish philosopher, writer and Individualist anarchist.

== Life ==
=== Education ===
Baha Tevfik was born in 1884 in İzmir which at the time was part of the Aydın province. He went to primary and secondary school there and graduated in 1907. He attended university at the Mekteb-i Mülkiye. He began working as an academic in philosophy which he would continue to do until his death.

Bahâ Tevfik began his writing career in 1907 by joining the editorial board of a newspaper in İzmir. After March 31, 1909, he moved to Istanbul and became a newspaper editor. In 1910, Tevfik founded the Scientific Publishing House and Philosophical Library of Renewal to "prepare the foundations of a social and scientific revolution."

Bahâ Tevfik translated the works of authors such as Friedrich Nietzsche, Ludwig Büchner, and Ernst Haeckel. He worked as an editor for 20 newspapers and magazines, and wrote and translated 17 books. In 1913, he started publishing "Felsefe Dergisi" (Philosophy Journal), the first Turkish philosophy journal.

=== Death ===
Baha Tevfik suffered from Appendicitis and died on 15 May 1914, at the age of 30.

== Ideas ==
Authors such as Ludwig Büchner, Ernst Haeckel and Friedrich Nietzsche greatly influenced the development of Baha Tevfik's ideas. He was greatly inspired by the ideas of Positivism and argued metaphysics should be excluded from philosophy. Another important concept that shaped Tevfik's thought process is the concept of selfishness. He defined selfishness as a person's desire for their own personality to remain eternal. According to him, all expressions of love could be reduced to an expression of selfishness.
