= International Group (Riga) =

The International group was a Riga-based radical anarchist organization, active around the time of the Russian Revolution of 1905. The leaflets of the group carried Bakunin's dictum, 'The urge to destroy is a creative urge' in their mastheads. In its propaganda of the organization denounced the notion that the 1905 revolution had been 'a democratic revolution'. The group rejected the line of the socialists, accusing them of seeking compromises with the capitalists within the parliamentary framework. In 1906 six teen-age members of the International group were sentenced to death and executed.
