= Delfín Lévano =

Delfín Lévano (4 November 1885 – 23 September 1941) was a Peruvian anarchist, journalist, poet, musician and lecturer. Founder of the newspaper La Protesta of Peru in its first phase (1911–'26) and El Proletariado of anarchist and anarchosyndicalist groups.

Son of the anarchist Manuel Caracciolo Lévano and father of César Lévano, a popular journalist and professor at the National University of San Marcos.

== Bibliography ==
- Luis Tejada Ripalda / César Lévano: La utopía libertaria en el Perú. Manuel y Delfín Lévano. Obra Completa, Fondo Editorial del Congreso del Peru, Lima 2006, ISBN 9972221059
