= Grand Prix motorcycle racing sponsorship liveries =

Insignia on racing motorcycles

Grand Prix motorcycle racing sponsorship liveries have been used since the late 1960s, replacing the previously used factory colours. With sponsors becoming more important with the rising costs in the motorcycle CC classes, many teams wanted to be able to display the logos of their sponsors as clearly as possible.

The liveries are usually changed for every season in the sport, marking the marketing ideas of the sponsors. Some teams keep some consistency over the years however, like the red colour present on Cagiva and MV Agusta, which has its origin in a shade of red known as rosso corsa being the national racing colour of Italy. Tobacco and alcohol advertising was common in motorsport, however as bans spread throughout the world, teams used an alternate livery which alluded to the tobacco or alcohol sponsor, or entirely eliminated their name when in nations with a ban – this is now only seen on Ducati's Marlboro sponsored vehicles – where the sponsor is technically banned from advertising in all host nations. At historical events, bikes are allowed to use the livery which was used when the bike was actively competing.

== Ángel Nieto Team ==
Ángel Nieto Team (formerly Aspar Racing Team) is a Grand Prix motorcycle racing team from Spain, currently competing in the MotoGP and Moto3 World Championships.

In the 2010 season the Aspar team entered the MotoGP class with Héctor Barberá, who finished in twelfth place aboard a Ducati Desmosedici GP10. Simón finished in second place in the inaugural Moto2 campaign, with teammate Mike Di Meglio finishing in twentieth place. Both riders started the season on Honda-powered RSV Motors frames, switching to a Suter chassis after two races. Nicolás Terol finished in second place in the 125cc class while his teammate Bradley Smith finished fourth, both riding Aprilia RSA 125 motorcycles.

Barberá remained with the team for 2011, recording a best result of 6th at the Spanish Grand Prix. The team expanded to two bikes in 2012, switching from Ducati to ART. Aleix Espargaró and Randy de Puniet dominated the recently created CRT (Claiming Rule Teams) class for two straight years. In 2014, Aspar entered two Honda bikes, after hiring former World Champion Nicky Hayden to partner Hiroshi Aoyama. The duo scored points regularly, but Espargaró claimed a 3rd straight title in the CRT class with Forward Racing. Irishman Eugene Laverty joined the team in 2015, the last year for Hayden in the World Championship before switching to the Superbike World Championship.

Before the 2018 season began, the team changed their name from Aspar Racing Team to Ángel Nieto Team, as a tribute by former team principal Jorge Fernandez to his former compatriot Ángel Nieto. The team also announced Ángel's son Gelete as the new team principal.

=== MotoGP ===
Year	Main colour(s)	Additional colour(s)	Main sponsor(s)	Additional major sponsor(s)	Notes
2010	Yellow	Blue, black	Páginas Amarillas	Bridgestone, Bancaja, Unibet, Mapfre, Pull&Bear, Öhlins, Brembo	
2011	Red, white	Black	Mapfre	Bridgestone, Bancaja, Pull&Bear, King Regal, Northgate, Öhlins, Brembo	
2012	Blue, white	Green, red	Power Electronics	Bridgestone, Bancaja, Mapfre, Vigo Viajes, Northgate, Pull&Bear, Bel-ray, Arrow, Öhlins, Brembo	
2013	Blue, white	Black	Power Electronics	Bridgestone, Pull&Bear, Bel-ray, Northgate, King Energy, SC Project, PBR, Regina Chain, Öhlins, Brembo	
2014	Black, grey	Green, white	Drive M7 Energy Drink	Bridgestone, Pull&Bear, Bel-ray, Northgate, NH Hotels, Arizona, Moldanorld, PBR, RK Rakasago Chain, SC Project, Öhlins, Brembo	
2015	White	Black	None	Bridgestone, Power Electronics, Pull&Bear, Northgate, SC Project, Öhlins, Brembo	
2016	White, blue/white	Black/grey, black	None/Pull&Bear	Michelin, Power Electronics, Motaro, Northgate, Arizona, Regina Chain, Akrapovič, Öhlins, Brembo	
2017	White	Black	Pull&Bear	Michelin, Motaro, Northgate, Arizona, ICW, Regina Chain, Akrapovič, Öhlins, Brembo	
2018	White	Black	Pull&Bear	Michelin, Motaro, Northgate, ABR, Arizona, ICW, Regina Chain, Akrapovič, Öhlins, Brembo	

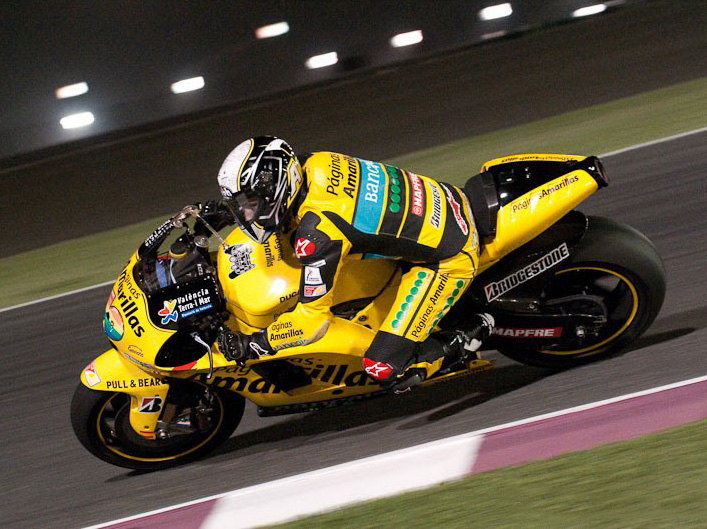
Héctor Barberá riding the Aspar Ducati GP10 at the 2010 Qatar Grand Prix.

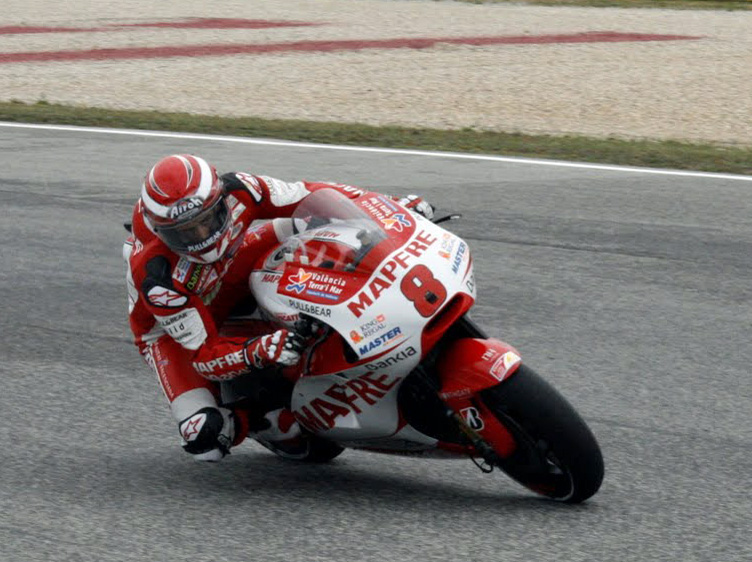
Héctor Barberá riding the Aspar Ducati GP11 at the 2011 Portuguese Grand Prix.

== Aprilia ==
Despite being a relatively small company by global motorcycling standards, Aprilia is very active in motorcycle sports. It contested many Road Racing formulae, including the now-defunct 125, 250, and 500cc Grand Prix classes of the FIM World Championship. From 2002 to 2004 they participated in the FIM MotoGP World Championship, and from 1999 to 2002 they participated in the FIM Superbike World Championship. Aprilia Racing has returned to World Superbike since the 2009 season and in MotoGP since the 2012 season.

Aprilia made their international racing debut in the Motocross World Championship competing in the 125cc class from 1976 until 1981 with a best result being a fifth place in the 1979 season with rider Corrado Maddi. The firm then focused on the Grand Prix road racing world championships in 1985 and since then it has seen varying successes. Aprilia won their first world championship race at the 1991 Czechoslovak motorcycle Grand Prix with rider Alessandro Gramigni winning the 125cc race. In 1992 they won their first road racing world championship with Gramigni winning the 125cc class. They continued to be successful in the smaller displacement categories, winning numerous races and championships in the 125 and 250cc Grand Prix classes.

However, their 500 cc Grand Prix bikes failed to attain the same success. They began campaigning in the 500cc class in 1994 with a 250 V twin motor enlarged to 380cc in hopes of using its lighter weight and nimble handling as an advantage against the heavier, V4 engine bikes used by the competition. The bike eventually displaced 430cc and had its best result with a third place by rider Doriano Romboni at the 1997 Dutch TT but, could never overcome power disadvantage during the starting line sprint and was withdrawn at the end of the 1997 season for further development. Their first MotoGP effort, dubbed the Aprilia RS Cube, was technically advanced but difficult to ride and performed poorly in the championship. The Cube did, however, pioneer many advanced technologies including ride by wire throttle and pneumatic valve actuation systems. Aprilia left the MotoGP class at the end of 2004 and then left the lower classes when two-stroke engines were banned. Aprilia set the record for the most points earned by a manufacturer in a single season from the 125cc class with 410 points in 2007. It was also the highest points earned by a constructor in Grand Prix motorcycle racing's history until 2011 when 420 points were won by the same bikes winning 16 out of 17 races.

Aprilia rejoined the MotoGP class in 2012, taking advantage of the newly introduced Claiming Rule Team category that encouraged independent teams with lower budgets to use bikes from manufacturers not officially involved in MotoGP. Aprilia supplied RSV4 SBK-derived bikes under the ART (Aprilia Racing Technology) name to Aspar, Paul Bird Motorsport and Speed Master teams. In both the 2012 and 2013 seasons Aprilia's ART machinery stood out as the best CRT bikes.

For 2015 Aprilia returned to the world championship with a factory effort.

=== 500cc/MotoGP ===
Year	Main colour(s)	Additional colour(s)	Main sponsor(s)	Additional major sponsor(s)	Notes
1994	Red	Silver, blue	Nastro Azzurro	Dunlop, IP - Italiana Petroli, Brembo, Norge, USAG, Dell'Orto, Digital, Damiani, Arrow Regina	
1995	Silver	Red, blue	Aprilia	Mobil 1, IP - Italiana Petroli, Giannelli Silencers, USAG, Dunlop, Norge, USAG, Dell'Orto, Digital, Damiani, Arrow	
1996	Silver	Red, blue	IP - Italiana Petroli	Dunlop, Nastro Azzurro, Lineltex, Norge, USAG, Dell'Orto, Digital, Damiani, Arrow	
1997	Silver	Blue, red	IP - Italiana Petroli	Dunlop, Lineltex, Gas Jeans, Norge, USAG, Dell'Orto, Digital, Damiani, Gianelli Silencers, Brembo	
1999	Black	Red, white	IP - Italiana Petroli	Dunlop, TIM, Diesel, Nastro Azzurro, PlayStation, USAG, DeliSat, Gianelli Silencers, Brembo, Regina Chain	
2000	Black	Red, grey	None	Michelin, Chronostar, MS, Sony, Coral Eurobet, Grissin Bon, IP - Italiana Petroli, Blu Telephone, Beck's, SKF, CIMA Festival, USAG, Dell'Orto, Regina Chain, Brembo, Unigraphics Solutions, AXO, Gianelli Silencers	MS logos replaced with a Barbary lion symbol in countries where tobacco sponsorship is forbidden.
2002	Black	Grey, white, red	MS	Dunlop, PlayStation 2, System Ceramics, IP - Italiana Petroli, Sector Sport Watches, CIMA Festival, USAG, SKF, Öhlins, Regina Chain, Brembo, Champion, Akrapovič	MS logos removed or replaced with "RS" in countries where tobacco sponsorship is forbidden.
2003	Black	Rainbow, red, blue, white	Alice	Michelin, PlayStation 2, Accossato, Grissin Bon, Sector Sport Watches, IP - Italiana Petroli, SAX, Regina Chain, Norge, SKF, USAG, Brembo, Akrapovič	SAX logos replaced with "XXX" in countries where tobacco sponsorship is forbidden.
2004	Gold, white	Black, red	MS	Michelin, ESZ PlayStation 2, IP - Italiana Petroli, CIMA, Regina Chain, AZ, SKF, USAG, Öhlins, Akrapovič	MS logos replaced with striped logos in countries where tobacco sponsorship is forbidden.
2015	Grey	Black, red	None	Bridgestone, Barracuda Moto, Motul, Inox Center, SAP, PBR, Dell'Orto, Cobo, Akrapovič	
2016	Grey, red, completely red (Valencia GP)	Green, black	Now TV	Michelin, SAP, Marsh, Piaggio, Dell'Orto, PBR, Reflex & Allen, Benotti, Motul, Akrapovič	Livery replaced with a special "#raceinred" variant for the 2016 Valencia Grand Prix.
2017	Red, green, completely red (Valencia GP)	Dark blue, white	Now TV/Sky	Michelin, Tribul MasterCard, SAP, Inox Center, Marsh, Piaggio, Dell'Orto, Experis, Motul, Regina Chain PBR, Champion Auto Parts, Akrapovič	Livery replaced with a special "#raceinred" variant for the 2017 Valencia Grand Prix.
2018	Red, completely red (Valencia GP)	Green, dark blue, white	Now TV	Michelin, Marsh, Piaggio, Dell'Orto, Experis, Motul, Regina Chain, PBR, Akrapovič	Livery replaced with a special "#raceinred" variant for the 2018 Valencia Grand Prix.
2021	Black	Red, Green, White	Sky Q	Michelin, Experis, Dell'Orto, FPT, Aprilia, Castrol, Indonesian Racing, kaspersky, nibat, PAN COMPOSITI, Regina Chain, PBR, Came, Akrapovič, Zanasi Group	on the front wing, there is the inscription "FAUSTO" as a tribute to Fausto Gresini.
2022	Black	Red, Green, White	SKY WIFI	Michelin, Dell'Orto, FORCH, Aprilia, Castrol, FPT, Indonesian Racing, kaspersky, Marsh, Manpower Group, nibat, PAN COMPOSITI, Regina Chain, PBR, SC PROJECT, Sprint Filter, Came, Akrapovič, Zanasi Group	
2023	Black	Red, Green, White	SKY	Michelin, BS BATTERY, CARE AR, CASE, Dell'Orto, fast trade, FORCH, Aprilia, Castrol, Indonesian Racing, Lifenet.it, Marsh, PAN COMPOSITI, Regina Chain, PBR, RCB, SC PROJECT, SHAREBOT, Sprint Filter, Came, YASHI COMPUTER	
2024	Black	Red, Green White	SKY	Michelin, BS BATTERY, CARE AR, CASE, Green Power Generations, Dell'Orto, fast trade, FORCH, Aprilia, Castrol, Indonesian Racing, Lifenet.it, PAN COMPOSITI, Regina Chain, PBR, PRAGMATIC PLAY, RCB, RINR, SC PROJECT, SHAREBOT, Sterilgarda Alimenti, Sprint Filter, Came, YASHI COMPUTER	
2025	Black	Red, Green White	SKY WIFI	Michelin, BS BATTERY, CARE AR, CASE, FES, Green Power Generations, Dell'Orto, fast trade, FORCH, Aprilia, Castrol, Indonesian Racing, Lifenet.it, PAN COMPOSITI, Regina Chain, PBR, PRAGMATIC PLAY, RCB, RINR, SC PROJECT, SHAREBOT, Sterilgarda Alimenti, Sprint Filter, TARGA, Came, YASHI COMPUTER	

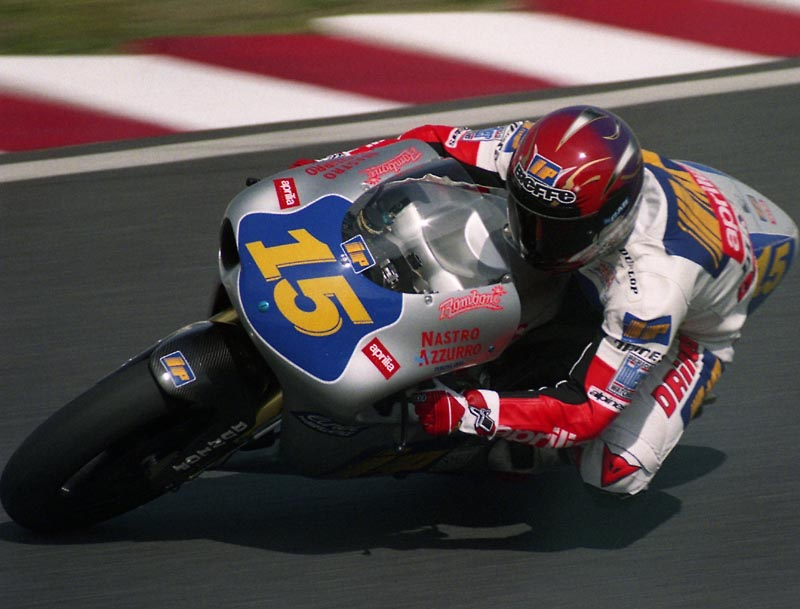
Doriano Romboni, riding his IP Aprilia RSW-2 500 in the 1996 Japanese Grand Prix.

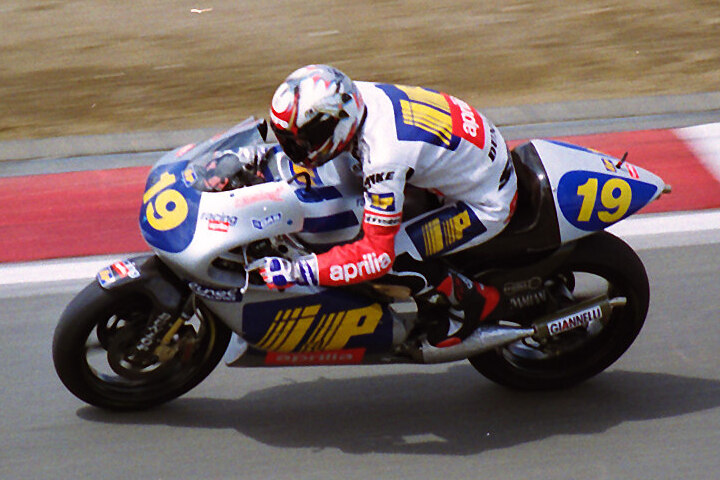
Doriano Romboni, riding his IP Aprilia RSW-2 500 in the 1997 German Grand Prix.

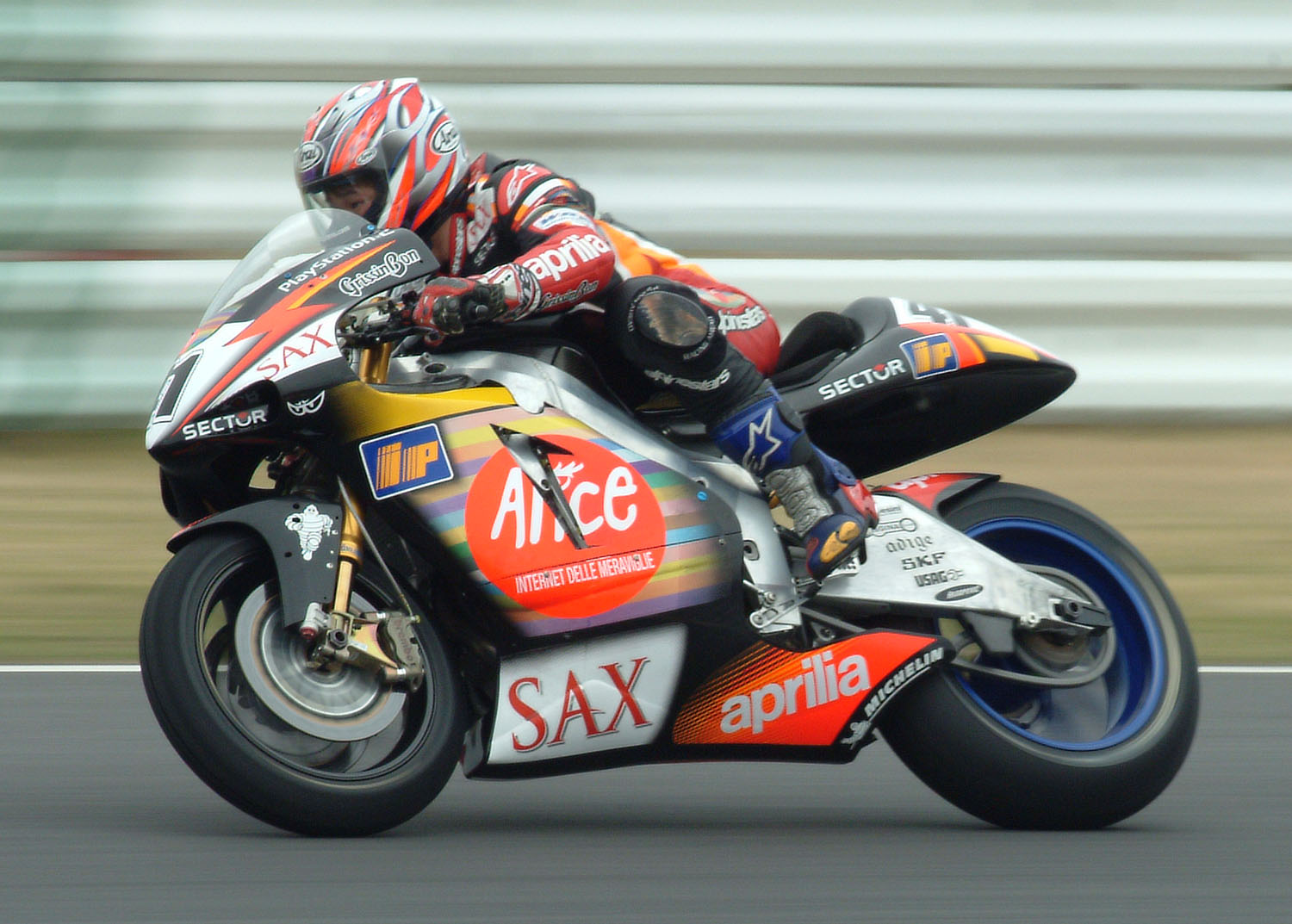
Noriyuki Haga, riding his Alice Aprilia RS Cube in the 2003 Japanese Grand Prix.

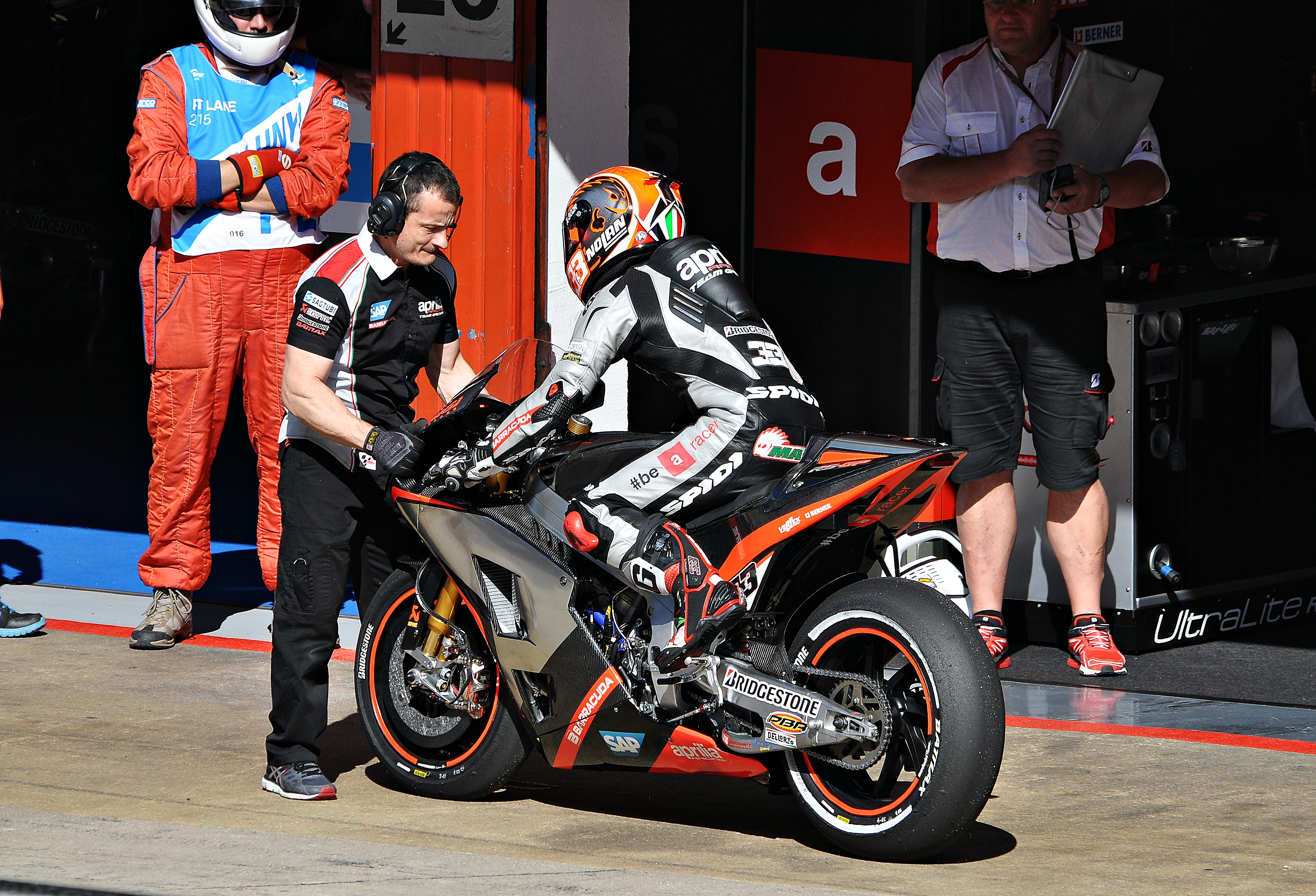
Marco Melandri on his Aprilia RS-GP during the 2015 Spanish Grand Prix.

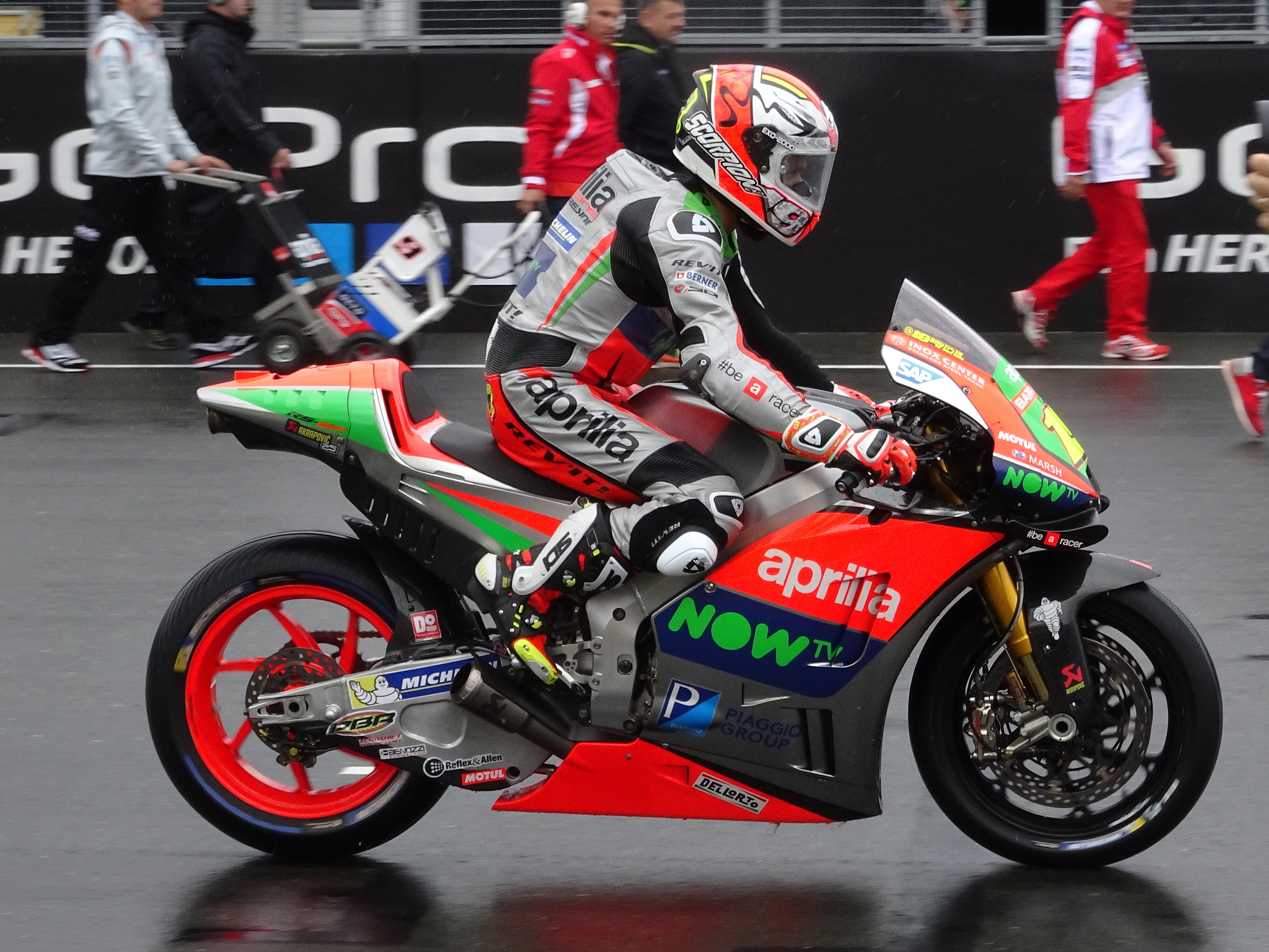
Álvaro Bautista on his Aprilia RS-GP during the 2016 German Grand Prix.

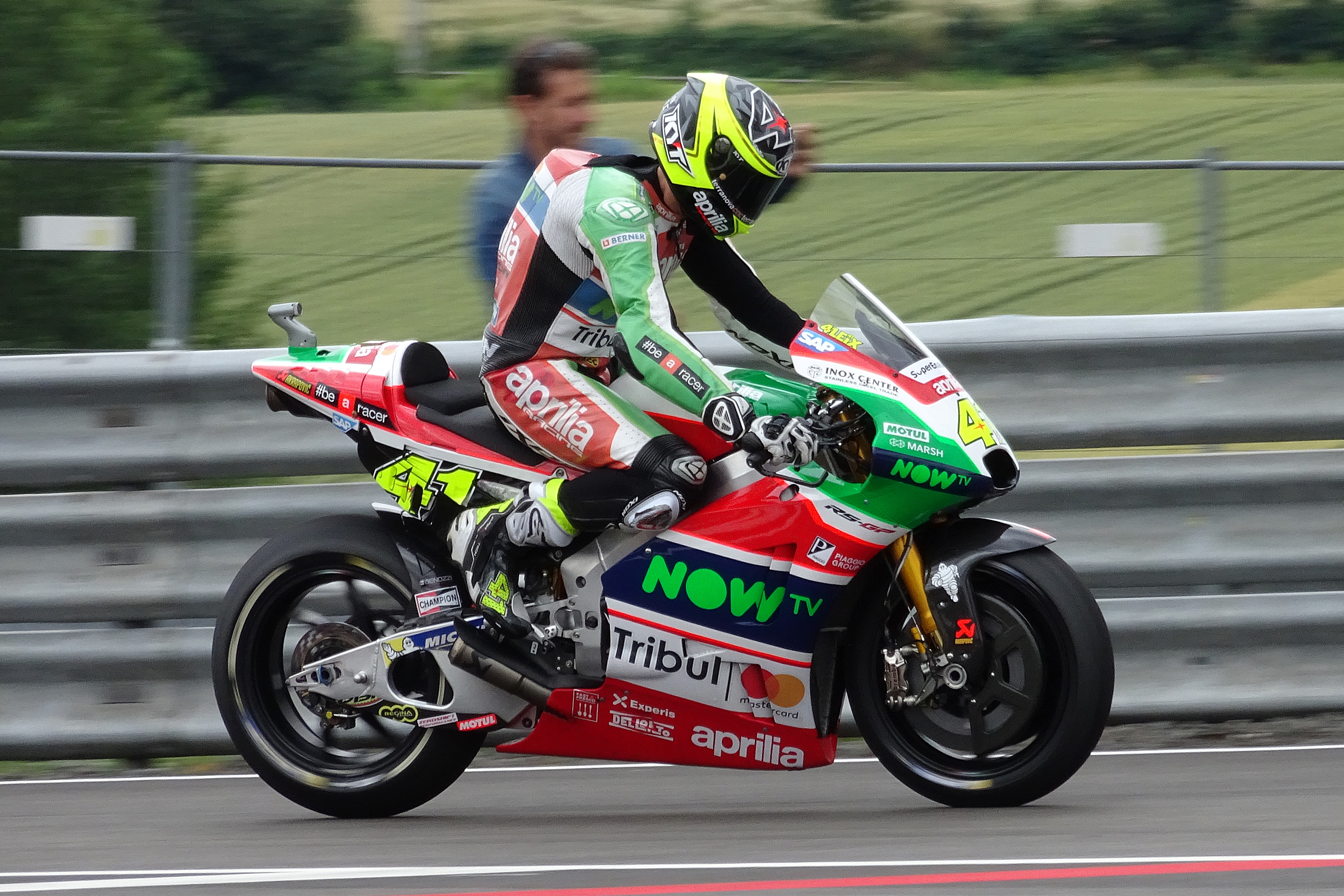
Aleix Espargaró, riding his Aprilia RS-GP in the 2017 German Grand Prix.

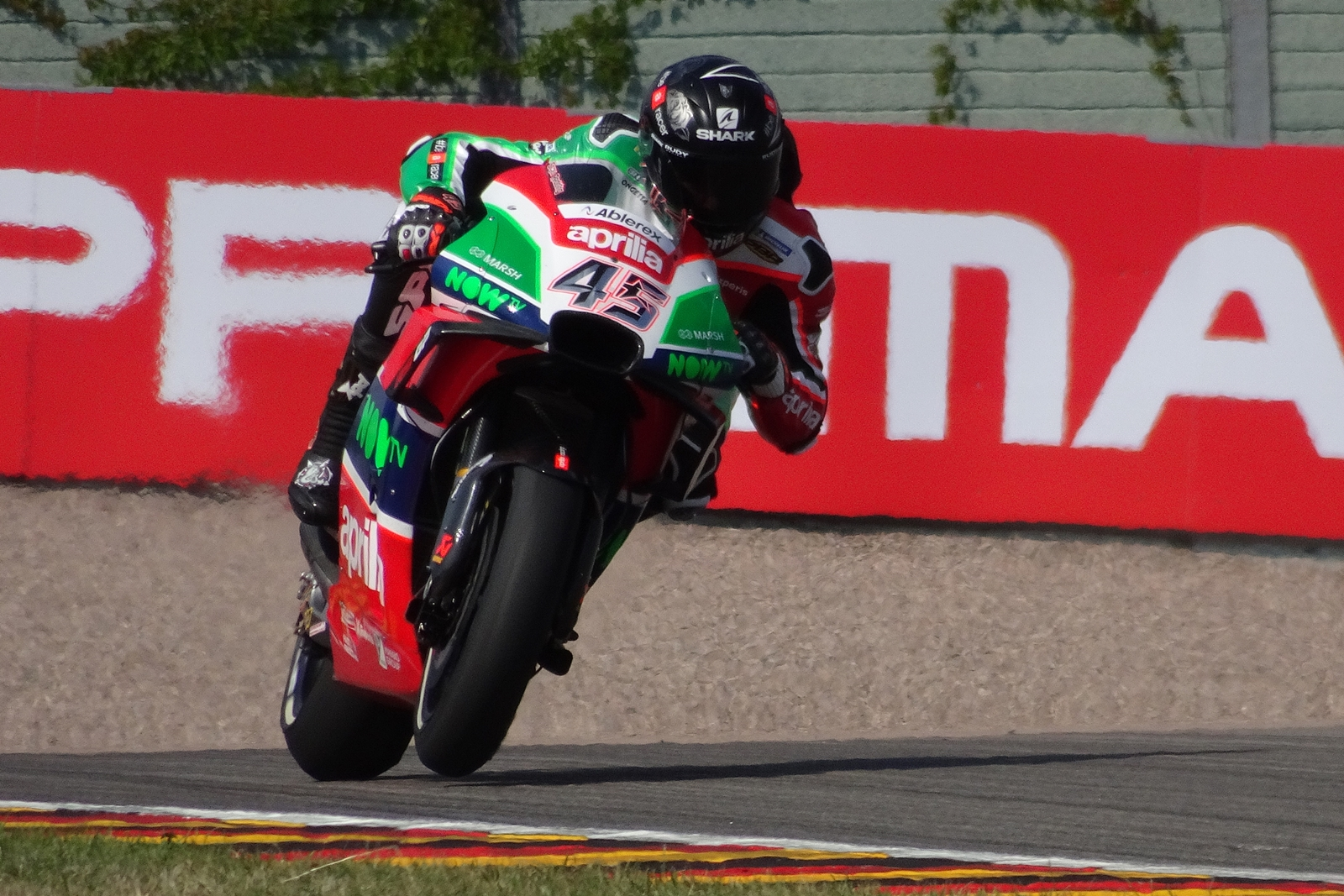
Scott Redding, riding his Aprilia RS-GP in the 2018 German Grand Prix.

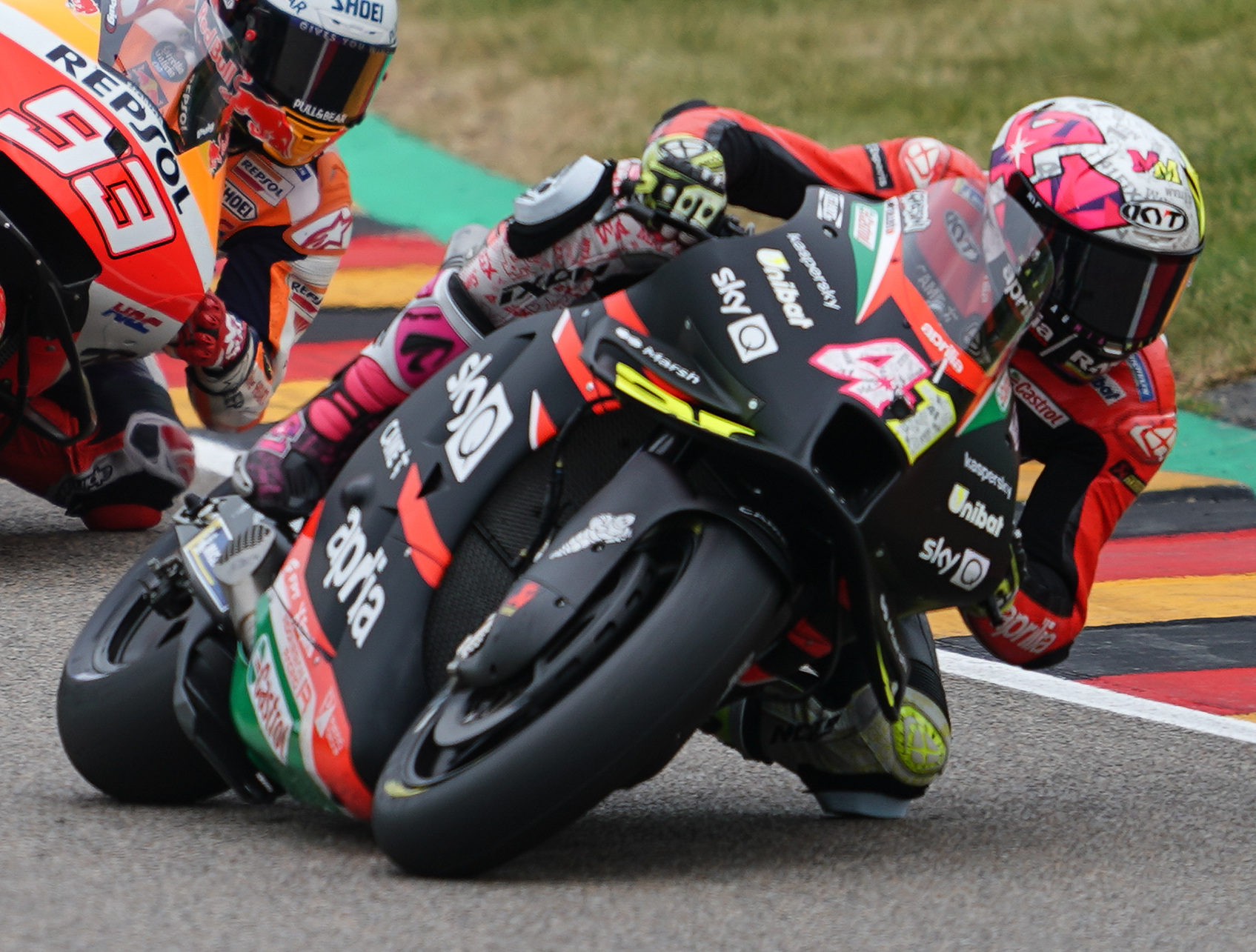
Aleix Espargaró, riding his Aprilia RS-GP in the 2021 German Grand Prix.

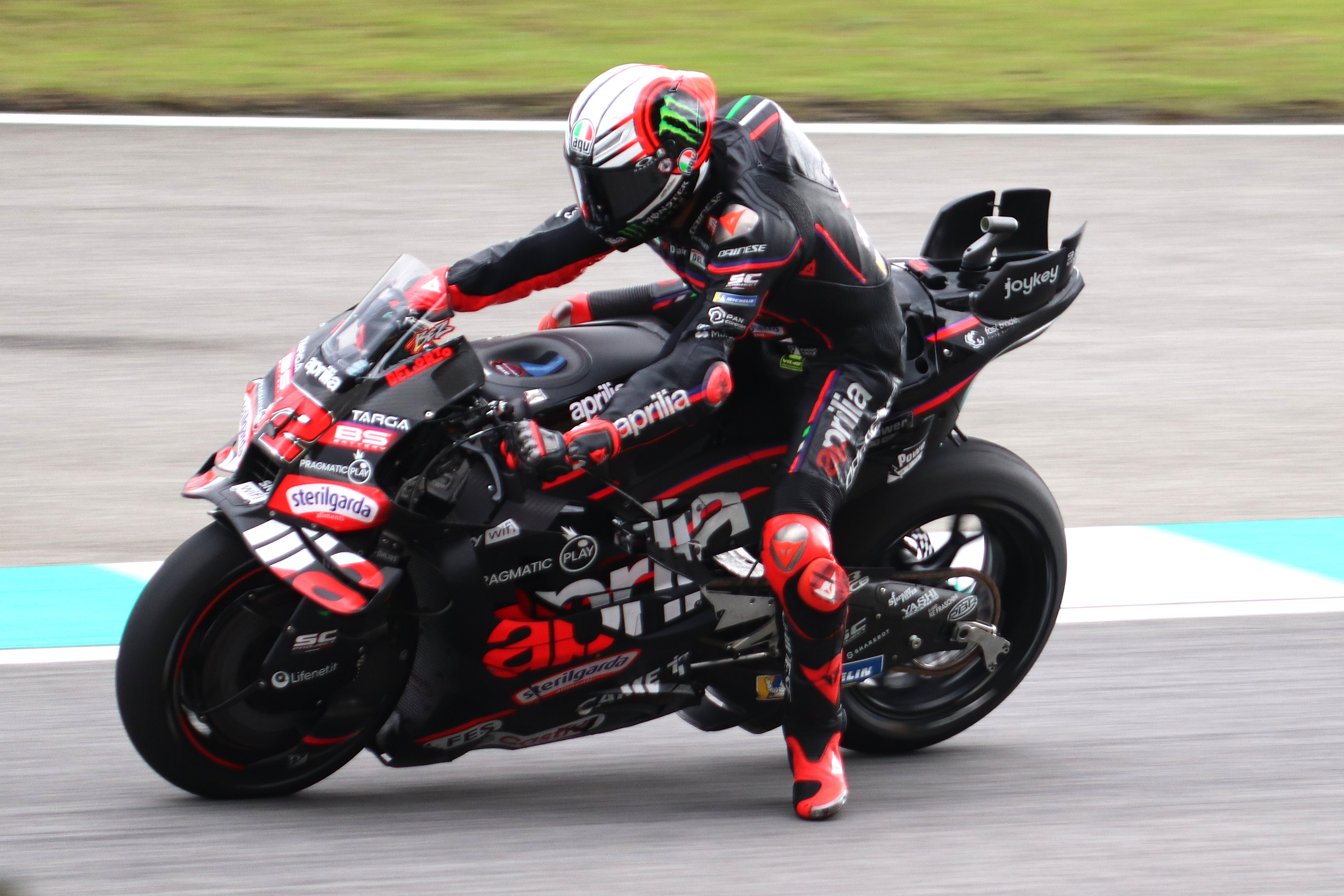
Marco Bezzecchi, riding his Aprilia RS-GP in the 2025 Malaysian Grand Prix.

== Avintia Racing ==
Avintia Racing is a motorcycle racing team currently competing in the MotoGP World Championship.

In 2012 the team changed its name to Avintia Racing, following an alliance between BQR and the Grupo Avintia. The team debuted in the MotoGP class as a Claiming Rule Team using both FTR Moto and Inmotec frames badged as BQR, powered by Kawasaki engines. The riders were Iván Silva and Yonny Hernández. In 2013 Avintia entered the MotoGP class with Kawasaki-engined FTR frames, fielding two bikes for Hiroshi Aoyama and Héctor Barberá.

For the 2014 season Aoyama was replaced by Mike Di Meglio and the team fielded a new bike badged as the Avintia GP14, reportedly based on the 2007-2009 Kawasaki Ninja ZX-RR with some input from Kawasaki. Following a mid-season agreement between Avintia and Ducati, Barberá received an Open-specification Ducati Desmosedici for the last five rounds.

In 2015 the team entered two Open class Desmosedici GP14 motorcycles, for Barberá and Di Meglio. For 2016 Di Meglio was replaced by Loris Baz. In 2017 the team changed its name to Reale Esponsorama Racing.

=== MotoGP ===
Year	Main colour(s)	Additional colour(s)	Main sponsor(s)	Additional major sponsor(s)	Notes
2012	Dark blue	White, green	Blusens	Bridgestone, STX, Halcourier, Ucalsa, Iveco, Galfer, Infema SA, Pachaa, KIA, Aegis, Allumeo, Transantolin, ICS, Öhlins, Europa FM, Arrow, Brembo	
2013	Dark blue, green	White	Blusens	Bridgestone, ASM, Ucalsa, Iveco, Benahavís, Gruas Aguilar, Petroagregados, J. Juan, Air Europa, Europa FM, Afron, Infema SA, Pachaa, Aegis, Allumeo, Transantolin, ICS Group, Galfer, Öhlins, Arrow, Brembo	
2014	White	Dark blue, green	None	Bridgestone, King Regal, Blusens, Chateau d'Ax, ICS Group, Tecnelt, Premier, Orona, BNFIT, Petroagregados, Pachaa, Vohdom, Titan, Shido, Domino, Silkolene, AFAM, Galfer, GoPro, J. Juan, Air Europa, Ibiza, Öhlins, Akrapovič, Brembo	
2015	Dark blue	White, red	None	Bridgestone, BNFIT, Chateau d'Ax, PBR, Regina Chain, King Regal, Petroagregados, Blusens, Orona, Galfer, Jimenez Eva, Cirsa, J. Juan, Air Europa, GoPro, Titan, Shido, Domino, Silkolene, Ibiza, Pachaa, Öhlins, Akrapovič, Brembo	
2016	Dark blue	White, red	None	Michelin, Chateau d'Ax, Cirsa, PBR, Regina Chain, Orona, BNFIT, Galfer, Tecnelt, J. Juan, Pachaa, Air Europa, Remica, Ibiza, Öhlins, Akrapovič, Brembo	
2017	White	Black, dark blue, yellow	Reale Seguros	Michelin, Cirsa, J. Juan, Pachaa, Air Europa, Remica, Ibiza, Cefosa, Transantolin, Tecnelt, Beta Tools, Regina Chain, Domino, Titan, Spider, Öhlins, Akrapovič, Brembo	
2018	Dark blue, white	Red	Reale Seguros	Michelin, Chateau d'Ax, Croisi Europe, Cirsa, Remeco, J. Juan, Motul, Air Europa, Ibiza, Transantolin, Tecnelt, Beta Tools, Regina Chain, Domino, Titan, Spider, Öhlins, Akrapovič, Brembo	

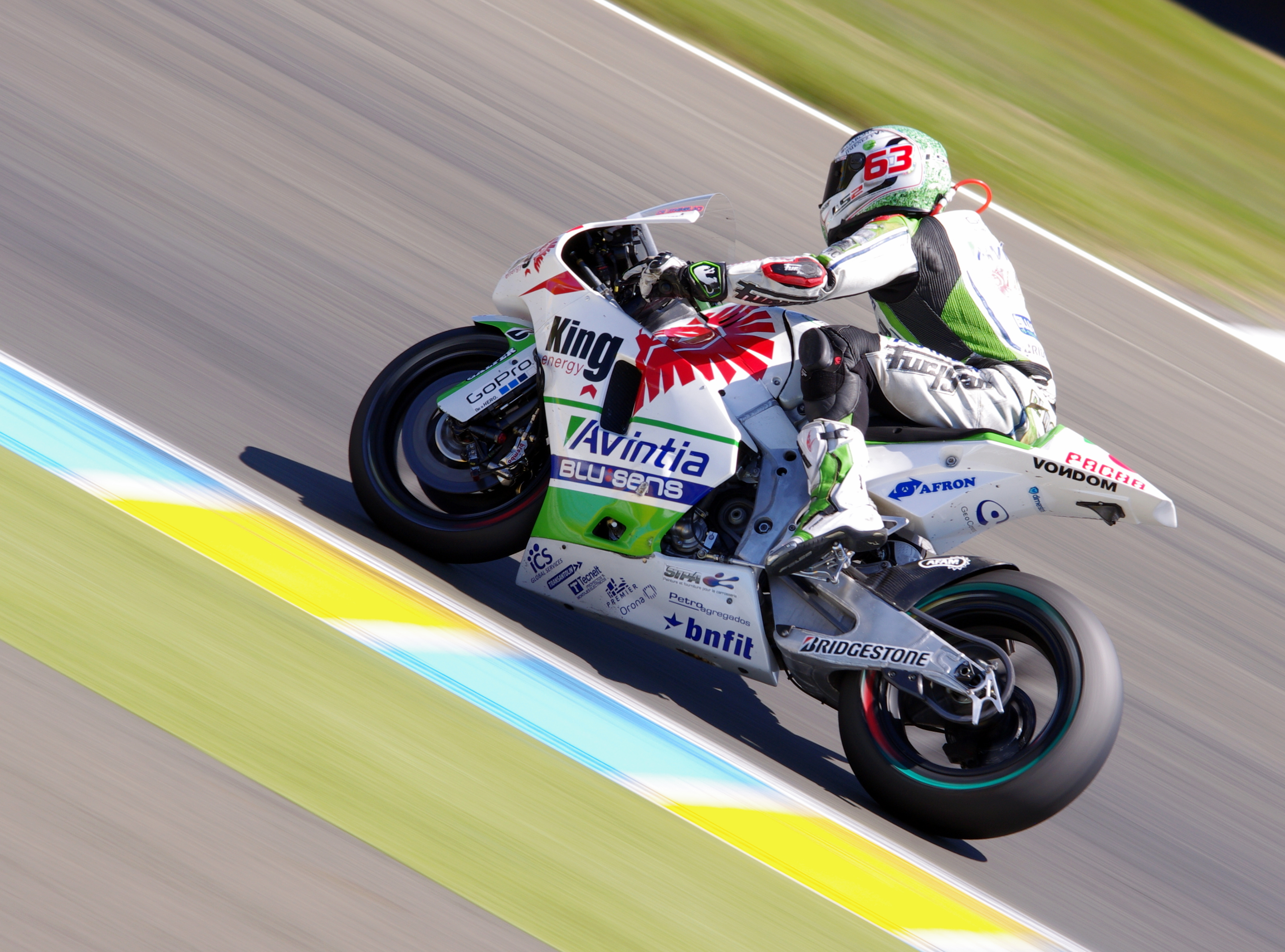
Mike Di Meglio, riding his Ducati Avintia at the 2014 French Grand Prix.

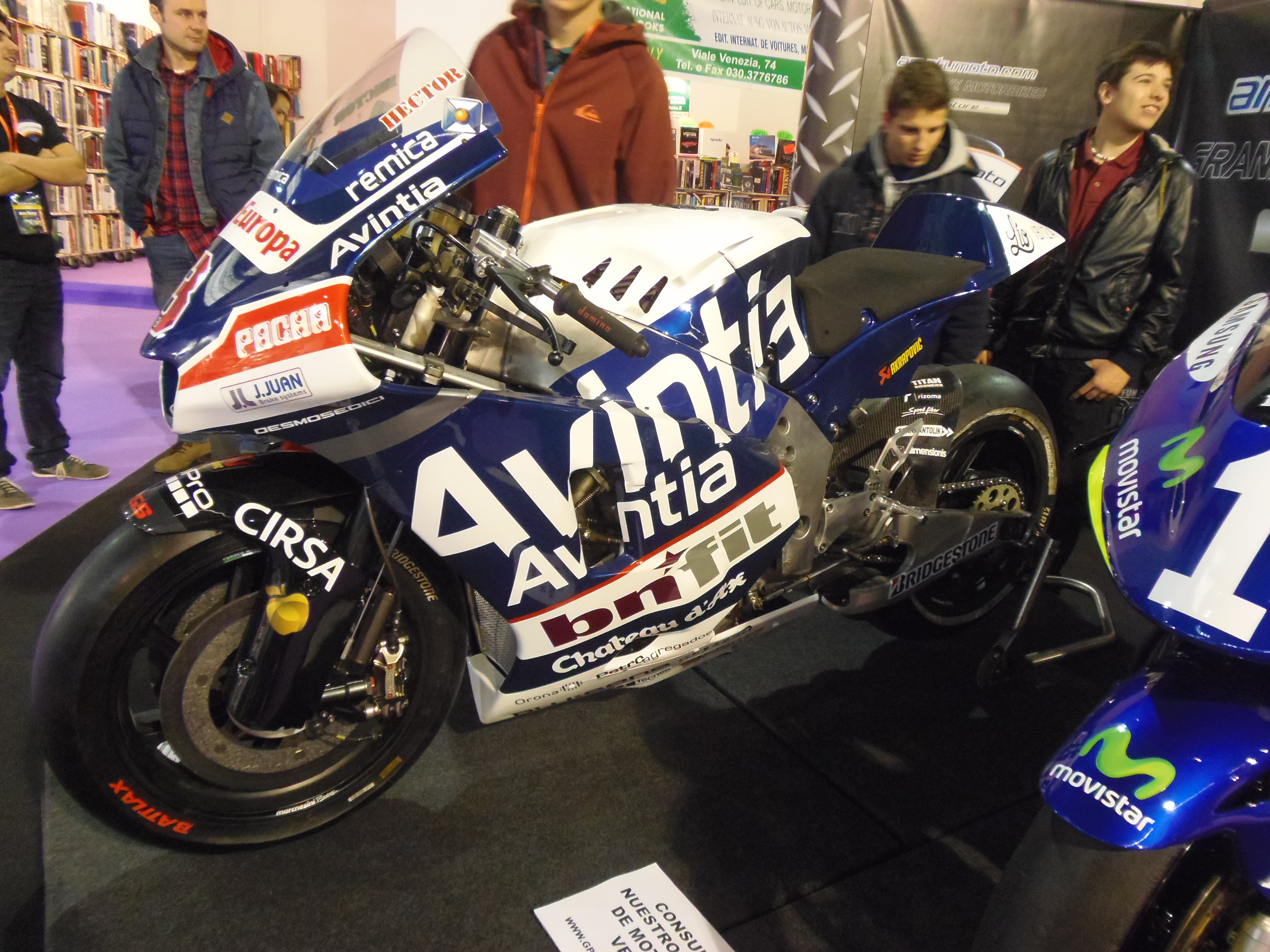
The Ducati Avintia, ridden by Héctor Barberá in the 2015 season on display.

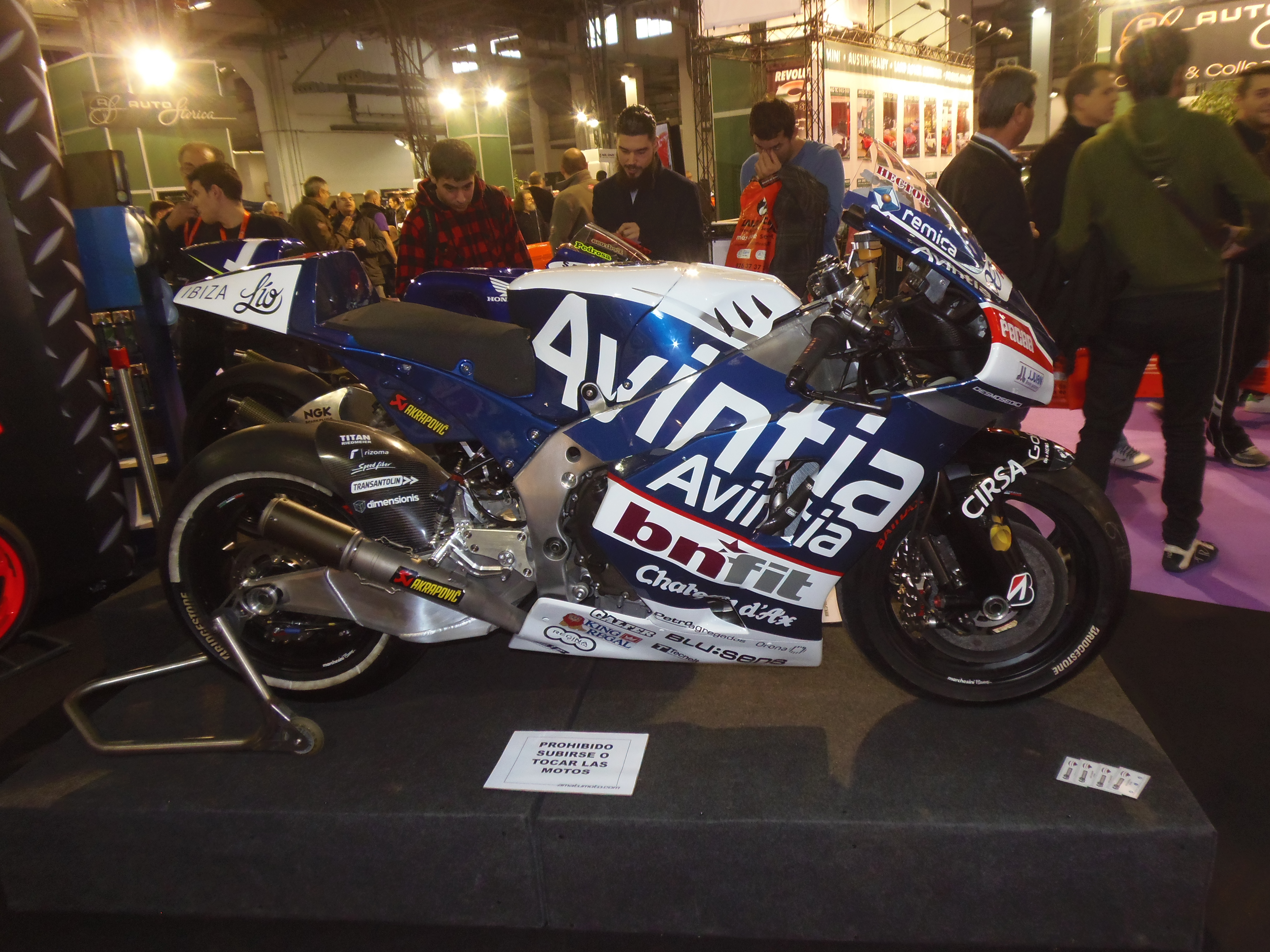
The 2015 Ducati Avintia of Héctor Barberá from another angle.

== Cagiva ==
At the end of the 1970s, Cagiva began campaigning the Grand Prix motorcycle racing circuit. Randy Mamola was its lead rider from 1988 to 1990, and he achieved Cagiva’s first podium result. The company would also have some technical assistance from Yamaha. In 1991 it signed former world champion Eddie Lawson to its team. Lawson would claim the company's first victory when he won the 1992 Hungarian Grand Prix. John Kocinski would also win a Grand Prix on a Cagiva GP500 (C594), finishing third in the 1994 world championship. While Kocinski had the best results to date on the Cagiva in 1994, the company withdrew at the end of the season. The bike made one appearance in 1995 at the Italian Grand Prix, where Pierfrancesco Chili finished 10th.

Overall, the Cagiva team had achieved 3 victories, 11 podiums, 6 pole position and 3 fastest laps in the 500cc.

=== 500cc ===
Year	Main colour(s)	Additional colour(s)	Main sponsor(s)	Additional major sponsor(s)	Notes
1983	Dark red	Grey, yellow	Cagiva	Michelin, Dunlop, Champion	
1984	Dark red	Grey, yellow	Cagiva	Dunlop, Arai, Michelin, Champion, Camel	
1985	Dark red	Grey, yellow	Cagiva	Michelin, Castrol	
1986	Dark red	grey, yellow	Cagiva	Michelin, Magneti Marelli, Castrol	
1987	Dark red	Yellow	Bastos cigarettes	Michelin, Magneti Marelli, Radici, Öhlins	
1988	Dark red	Yellow	Cagiva	Pirelli, Öhlins, Agip, Magneti Marelli, Brembo	
1989	Dark red	Yellow	Cagiva	Michelin, Agip, Magneti Marelli, Weber, Arai	
1990	Dark red	Yellow	Cagiva	Michelin, Agip, Magneti Marelli, Weber, Brembo, USAG, Arai, Öhlins, Regina, Mini Moke	
1991	Dark red	Yellow	Cagiva	Michelin, Agip, FIAT, Magneti Marelli, Brembo, USAG, Arai, Shoei, Öhlins, Regina	
1992	Red	White	Cagiva	Dunlop, Agip, Intergraph, Brembo, USAG, Shoei, Öhlins	
1993	Red	White	Cagiva	Michelin, Agip, Brembo, Magneti Marelli, Öhlins	
1994	Red	White	Cagiva	Michelin, Agip, D.I.D, Öhlins	
1995	Red	White	Cagiva	Michelin, Agip, D.I.D, Öhlins	

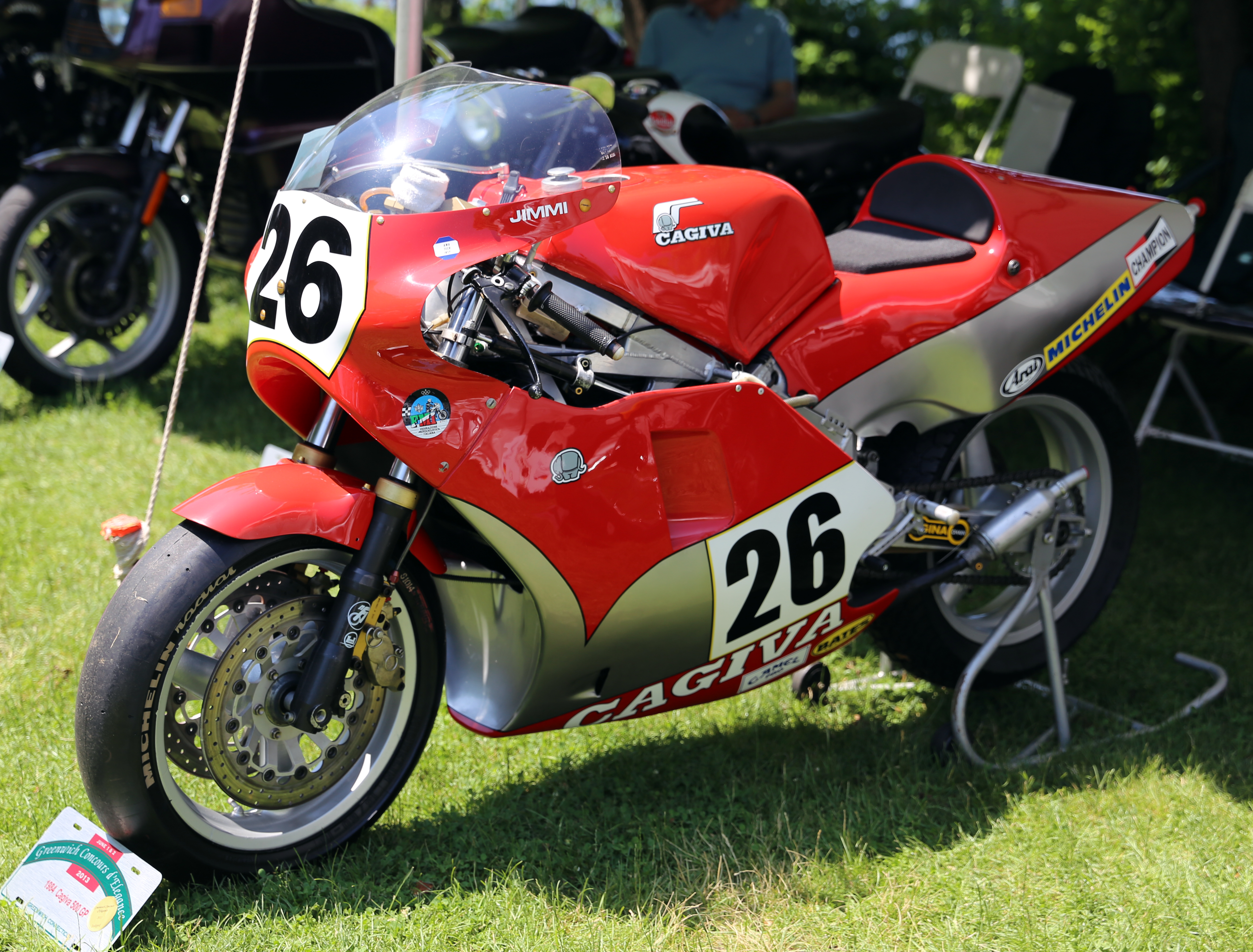
The 1984 Cagiva GP500 (Cagiva 4C3) motorcycle at the 2013 Greenwich Concours d'Elegance, which ridden by Marco Lucchinelli and Herve Moineau on display.

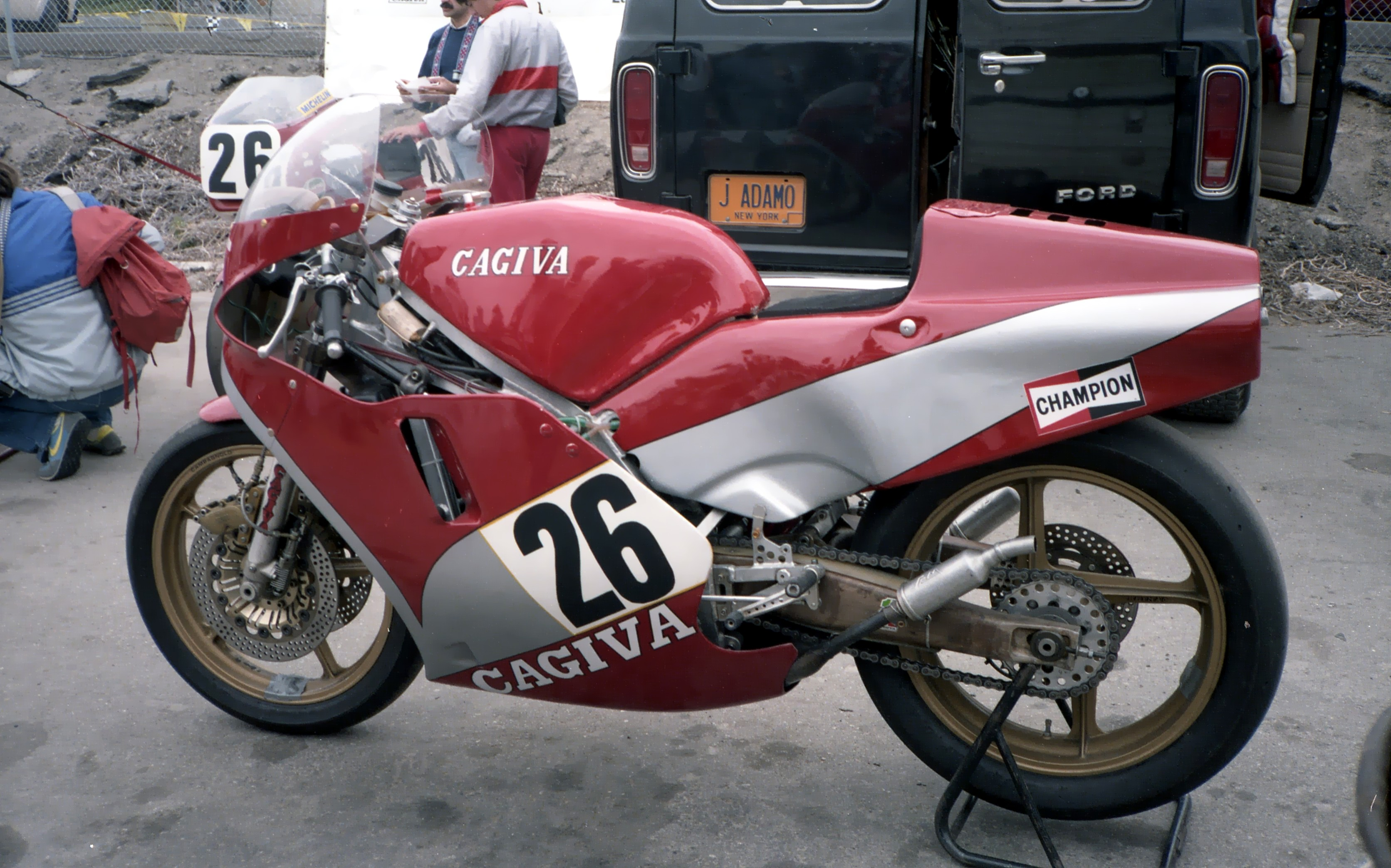
The Cagiva C10V motorcycle, which was ridden by Marco Lucchinelli in the 1985 championship.

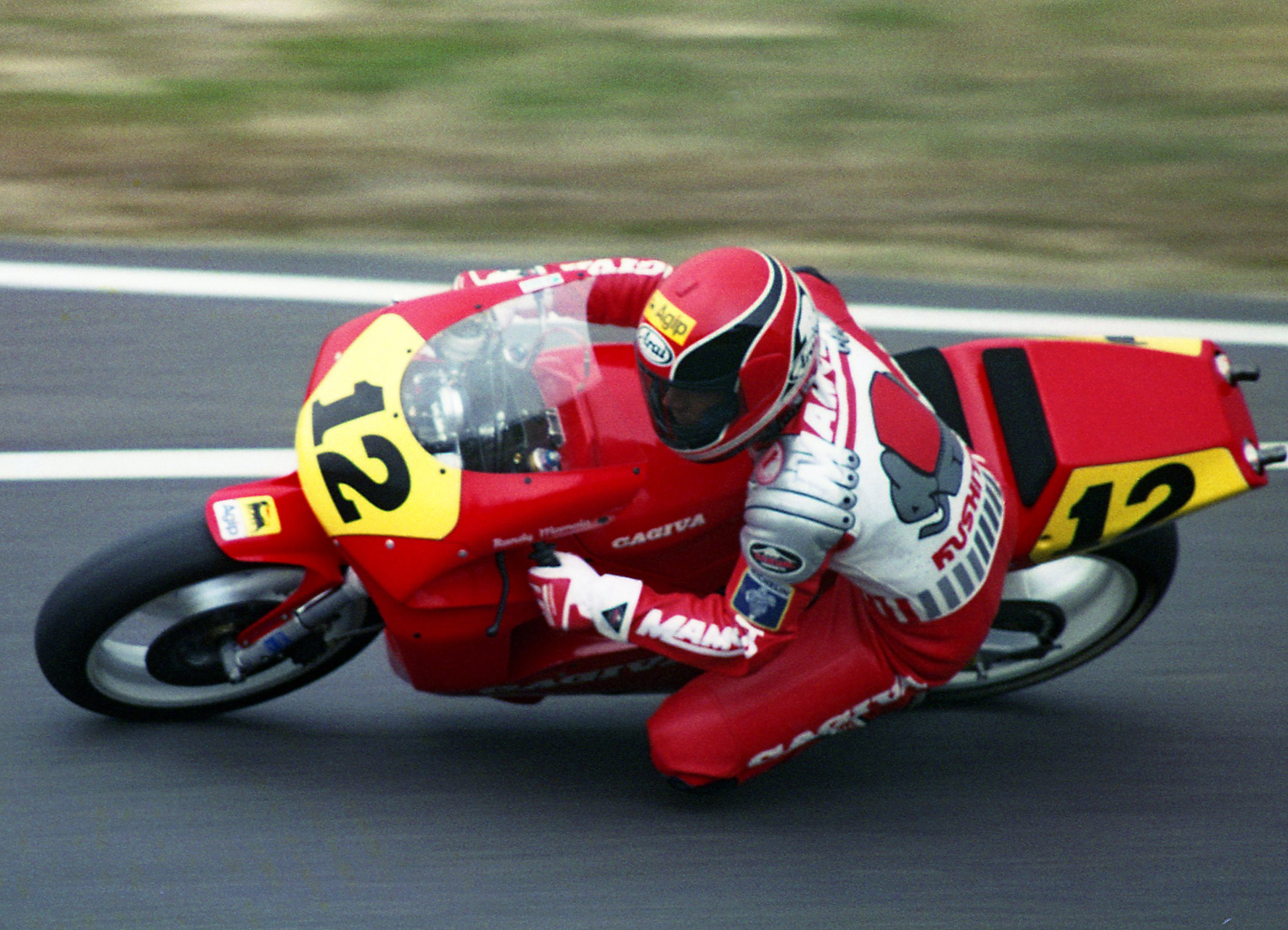
Randy Mamola, riding his Cagiva C589 at the 1989 Japanese GP.

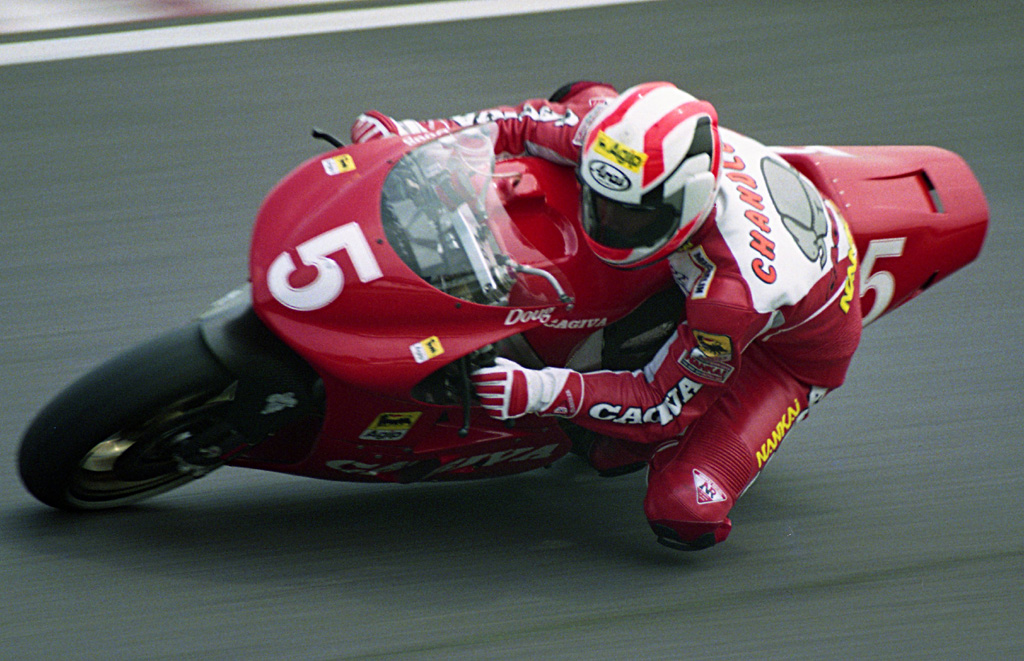
Doug Chandler riding his Cagiva C593 at the 1993 Japanese Grand Prix.

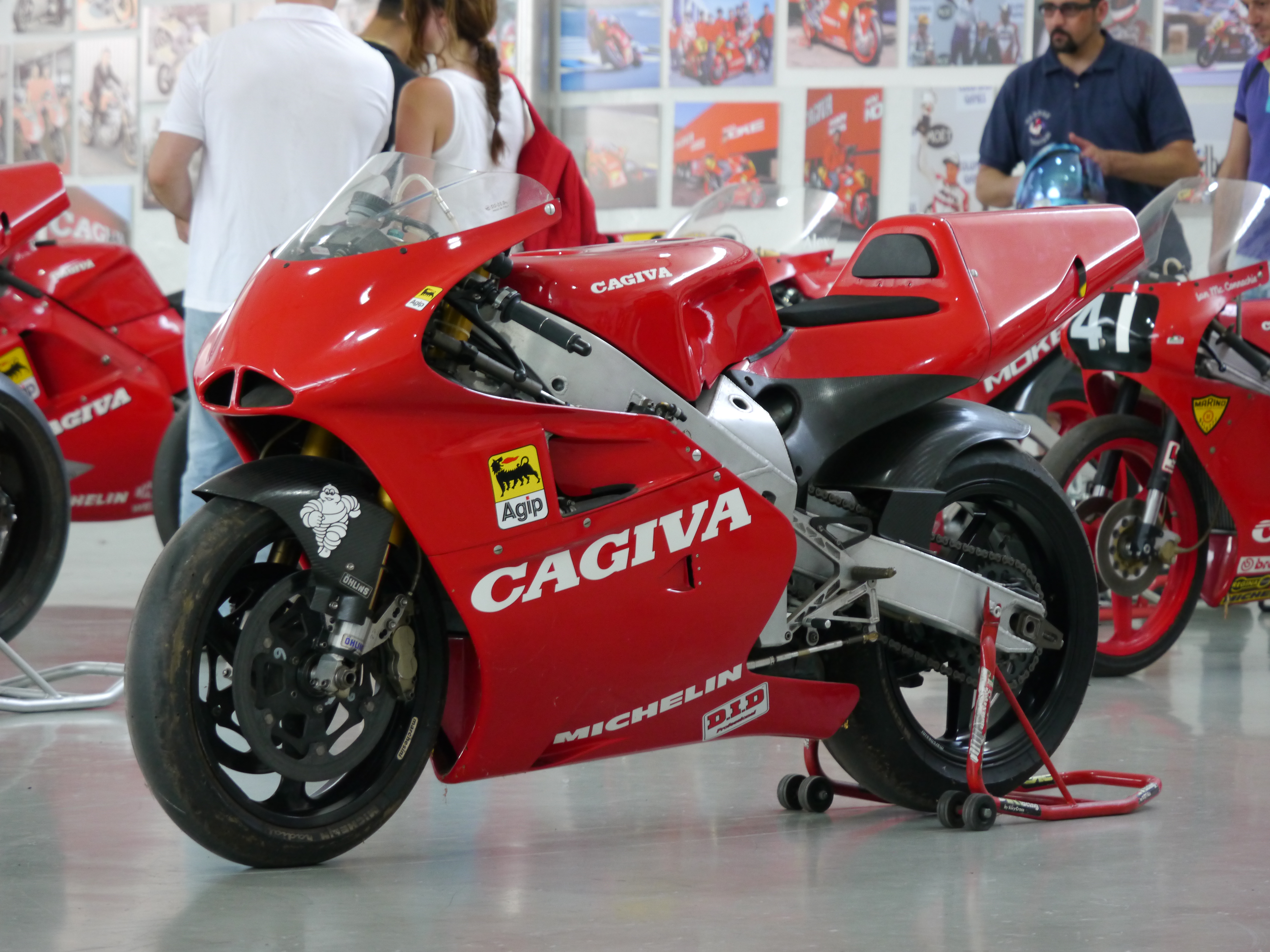
The Cagiva C594, which was ridden by John Kocinski and Doug Chandler in the 1994 championship. Kocinski finished third in the championship, and it was the final bike created before Cagiva pulled out of the 500cc.

== Ducati ==
When the MotoGP technical rules changed in the 2002 season, giving priority to four-stroke machinery, Ducati decided to enter Grand Prix motorcycle racing.

Ducati's first MotoGP motorcycle was unveiled at the 2002 Italian GP at Mugello, for use in the 2003 MotoGP championship. Ducati Corse began taking part in the MotoGP Championship in the 2003 season and won one title in the 2007 season.

=== 500cc ===
Year	Main colour(s)	Additional colour(s)	Main sponsor(s)	Notes
1971-1972	Silver	Yellow	Ducati	

=== MotoGP ===
Year	Main colour(s)	Additional colour(s)	Main sponsor(s)	Additional major sponsor(s)	Notes
2003	Red	White	Marlboro	Michelin, Shell, FILA, Magneti Marelli, Polini, Champion, Suomy	Marlboro logos removed in countries where tobacco sponsorship is forbidden.
2004	Red	White	Marlboro	Michelin, Alice, Shell, FILA, Magneti Marelli, AMD, Polini, Champion, Suomy	Marlboro logos removed in countries where tobacco sponsorship is forbidden.
2005	Red	White	Marlboro	Bridgestone, Alice, Shell, Breil, Magneti Marelli, Suomy	Marlboro logos removed or replaced with a red & black barcode in countries where tobacco sponsorship is forbidden.
2006	Red	White	Marlboro	Bridgestone, Alice, Shell, Breil, Suomy, Arai Helmet	Marlboro logos removed or replaced with a red barcode in countries where tobacco sponsorship is forbidden.
2007	Red	White	Marlboro	Bridgestone, Alice, Shell, SanDisk, Alfa Romeo, Nolan Helmets, Oakley, Alpinestars	Marlboro logos replaced with a white & red barcode in countries where tobacco sponsorship is forbidden.
2008	Red	White	Marlboro	Bridgestone, Alice, Shell, SanDisk, Alfa Romeo, Enel, Riello Ups, Nolan Helmets	Marlboro logos replaced with a white & red barcode in countries where tobacco sponsorship is forbidden.
2009	Red	White	Marlboro	Bridgestone, Alice, TIM, Shell, SanDisk, Enel, Riello Ups, Assicurazioni Generali, Nolan Helmets, Guabello	Marlboro logos replaced with a white, red & black barcode in countries where tobacco sponsorship is forbidden.
2010	Red	White	Marlboro	Bridgestone, TIM, Enel, Riello Ups, Assicurazioni Generali, Nolan Helmets	Marlboro logos removed or replaced with a white, red & black barcode in all races due to tobacco sponsorship bans.
2011	Red	White	Marlboro	Bridgestone, AMG, TIM, Shell, Enel, Riello Ups, Assicurazioni Generali, Monster Energy	Marlboro logos permanently replaced with "Ducati" logos.
2012	Red	White	Marlboro	Bridgestone, AMG, TIM, Shell, Enel, Riello Ups, Assicurazioni Generali, Monster Energy	Marlboro logos permanently replaced with "Ducati" logos.
2013	Red	White	Marlboro	Bridgestone, TIM, Shell, Riello Ups, Airoh Helmets	Marlboro logos permanently replaced with "Ducati" logos.
2014	Red	White	Marlboro	Bridgestone, Akrapovič, ZF Friedrichshafen, TIM, Shell, Riello Ups, Suomy	Marlboro logos permanently replaced with "Ducati" logos.
2015	Red	White	Marlboro	Bridgestone, Akrapovič, ZF Friedrichshafen, OMP Racing, SKF, TIM, Shell, Unibat, Riello Ups, Suomy	Marlboro logos permanently replaced with "Ducati" logos.
2016	Red	White	Marlboro	Michelin, Akrapovič, OMP Racing, Givi, SKF, Unibat, Baxi, Flex-Box, TIM, Shell, Riello Ups, Suomy	Marlboro logos permanently replaced with "Ducati" logos.
2017	Red	White	Marlboro	Michelin, Akrapovič, Reflexallen, OMP Racing, SKF, Unibat, PittaRosso, Givi, Flex-Box, Magneti Marelli, TIM, Shell, Riello Ups, UnipolSai, Suomy	Marlboro logos permanently replaced with "Ducati" logos.
2018	Red	White, grey	Marlboro	Michelin, Akrapovič, Reflexallen, OMP Racing, SKF, Valsir, PittaRosso, Givi, NetApp, Unibat, Flex-Box, Magneti Marelli, TIM, Shell, Riello Ups, UnipolSai, Monster Energy, Suomy	Marlboro logos permanently replaced with "Ducati" logos.
2019	Red	Black	Mission Winnow	Michelin, Akrapovič, cefla, Frecciarossa, Reflexallen, DAIKO, D.I.D, SKF, Valsir, GIVI, Lenovo, NetApp, Audi Sport, PittaRosso, Riello Ups, Shell	
2021	Red	Black	Lenovo	Michelin, Akrapovič, aruba.it, BANCOMAT PAY, esaote, Frecciarossa, Reflexallen, DAIKO, D.I.D, NetApp, Audi Sport, GIVI, Riello Ups, Flex-Box, Marelli, Q1 Premium Masking Solutions, Shell, steparava	
2022	Red	Black	Lenovo	Michelin, Akrapovič, aruba.it, BANCOMAT PAY, CARRERA, esaote, Frecciarossa, Reflexallen, DAIKO, D.I.D, NetApp, GIVI, SKF, Riello Ups, Flex-Box, Marelli, Q1 Premium Masking Solutions, Shell, Siemens, steparava, SIRA INDUSTRIE, Var Group	
2023	Red	Black	Lenovo	Michelin, Akrapovič, aruba.it, CARRERA, esaote, Frecciarossa, Reflexallen, DAIKO, D.I.D, NetApp, GIVI, Riello Ups, Flex-Box, Marelli, Monster Energy, PAGO BANCOMAT, Shell, Siemens, steparava, Var Group	
2024-2025	Red	Black	Lenovo	Michelin, Akrapovič, aruba.it, CARRERA, elica, Eternoo (2025), Frecciarossa, Reflexallen, DAIKO, D.I.D, NetApp, Audi Sport, GIVI, Riello Ups, Flex-Box, Marelli, Monster Energy, TIM, Shell, Siemens, steparava, Var Group, WD-40	
2026	Red	Black, White	Lenovo	Michelin, Akrapovič, aruba.it, CARRERA, Eternoo, Frecciarossa, Reflexallen, DAIKO, D.I.D, NetApp, Audi Sport, GIVI, Riello Ups, Flex-Box, Marelli, Monster Energy, TIM, Shell, Siemens, steparava, Var Group, WD-40	

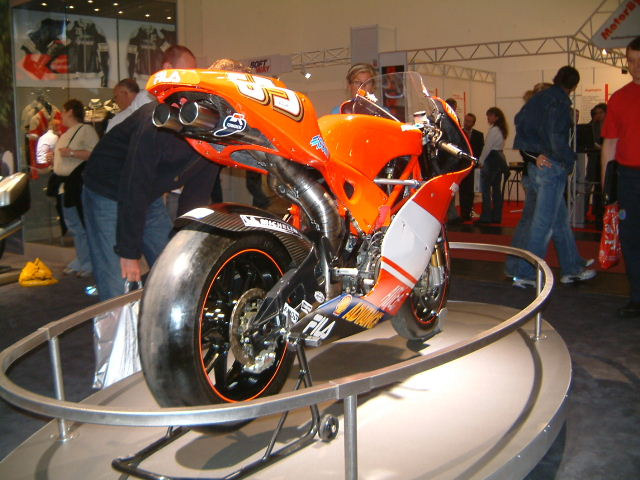
The Ducati Desmosedici GP4, ridden by Troy Bayliss and Loris Capirossi in 2004 on display.

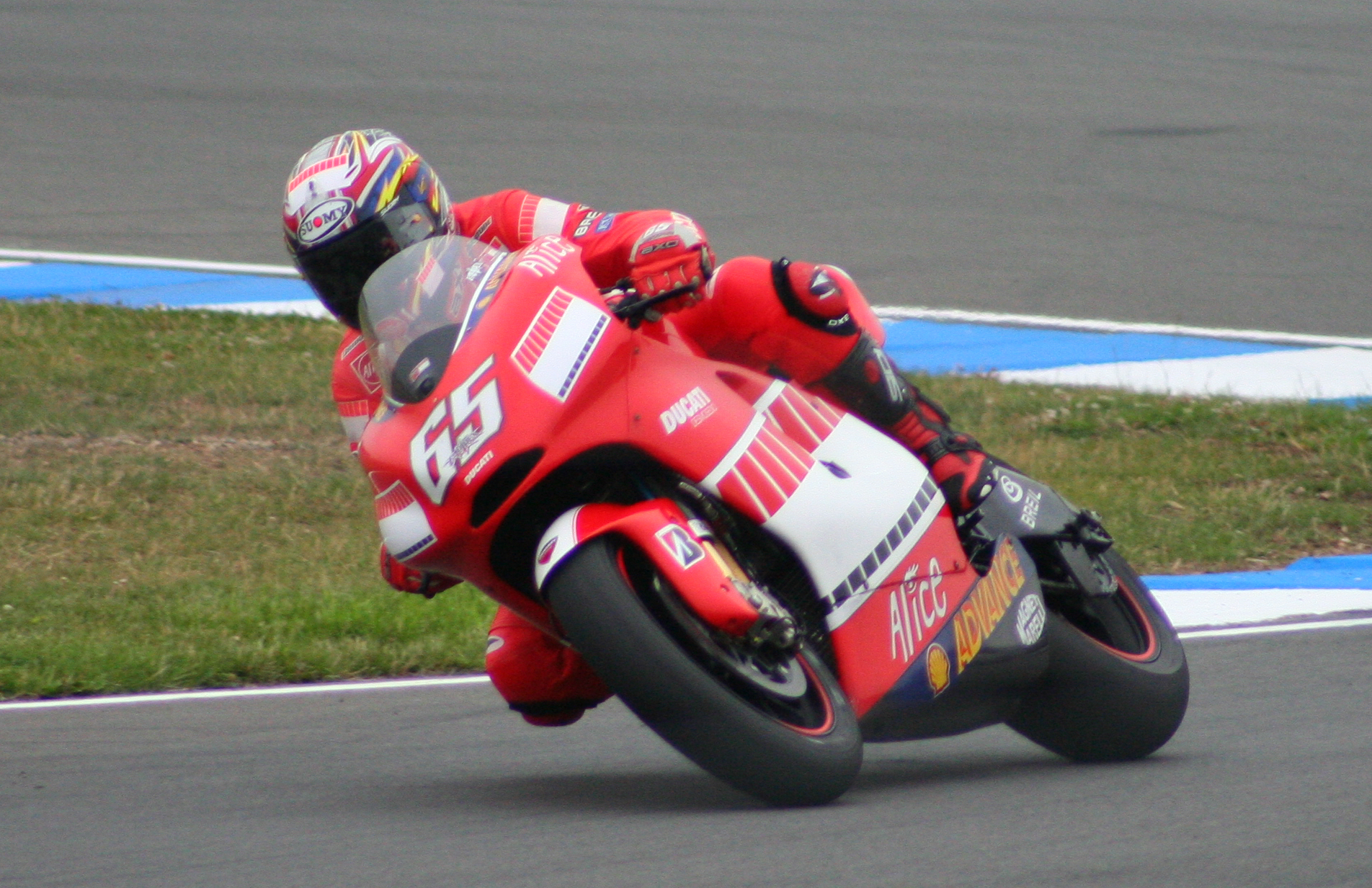
Loris Capirossi riding his Ducati Desmosedici GP5 in 2005 with an alternative red & black "barcode" livery.

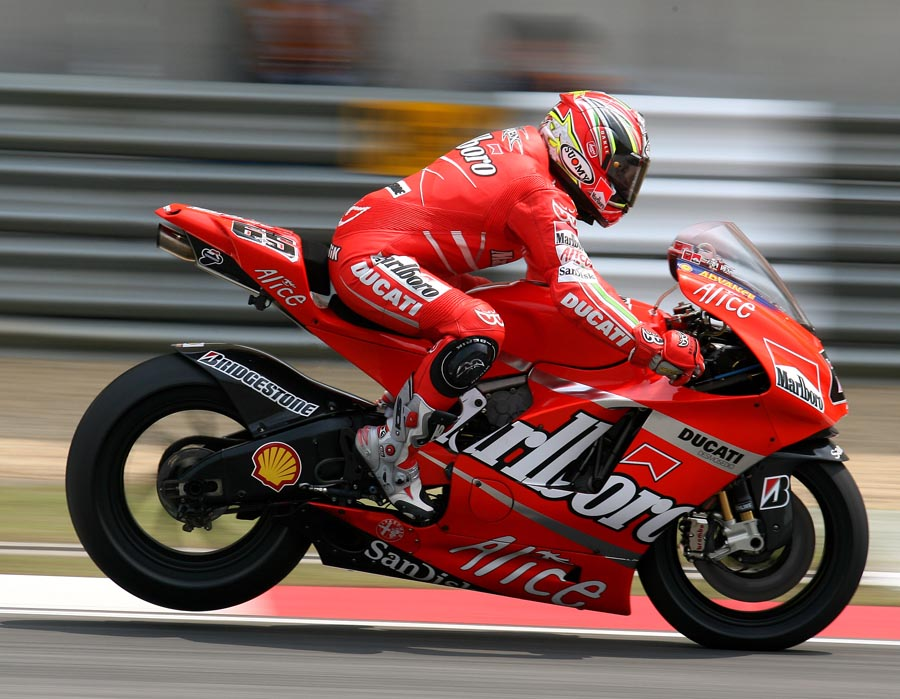
Loris Capirossi on the 2007 Ducati Desmosedici GP7. Since 2005, many countries forbid specific tobacco advertising, but races like Qatar and China did not have any anti-tobacco legislation until 2010.

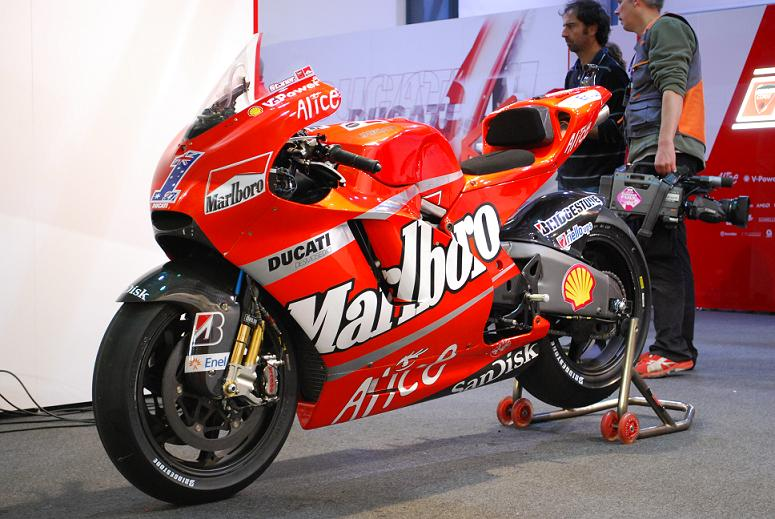
Casey Stoner's 2008 Ducati Desmosedici GP8.

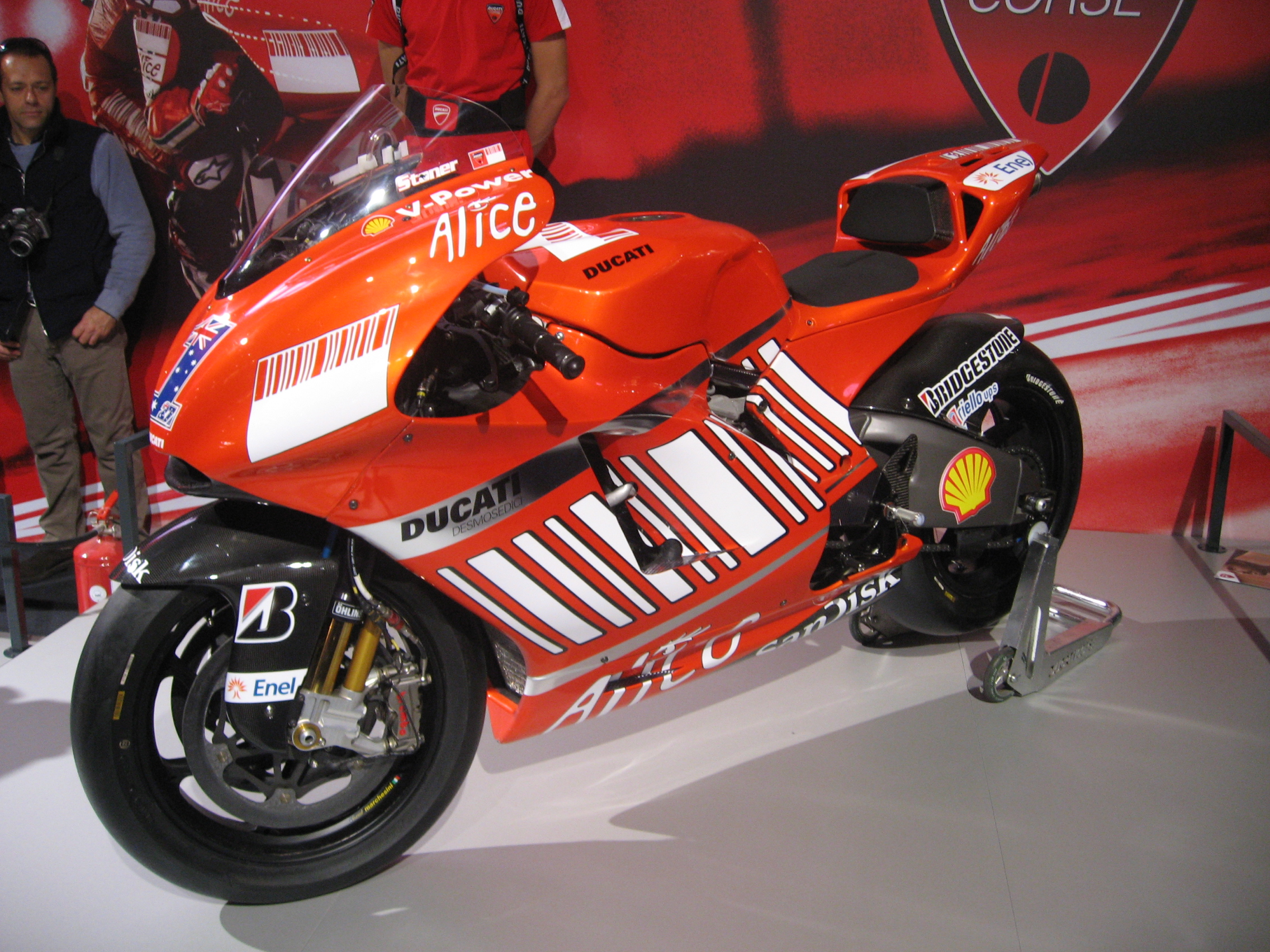
Casey Stoner's 2008 Ducati Desmosedici GP8 with the alternative "barcode" livery.

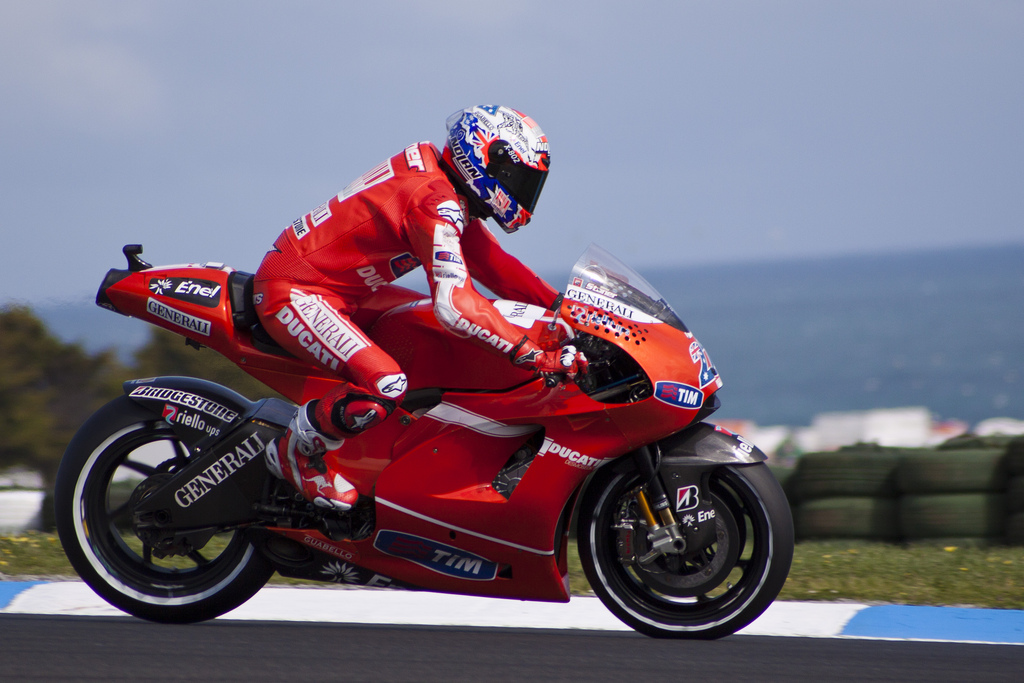
Casey Stoner, riding his 2010 Ducati Desmosedici GP10 in Philip Island, Australia. Note that the alternative "barcode" livery has been removed completely.

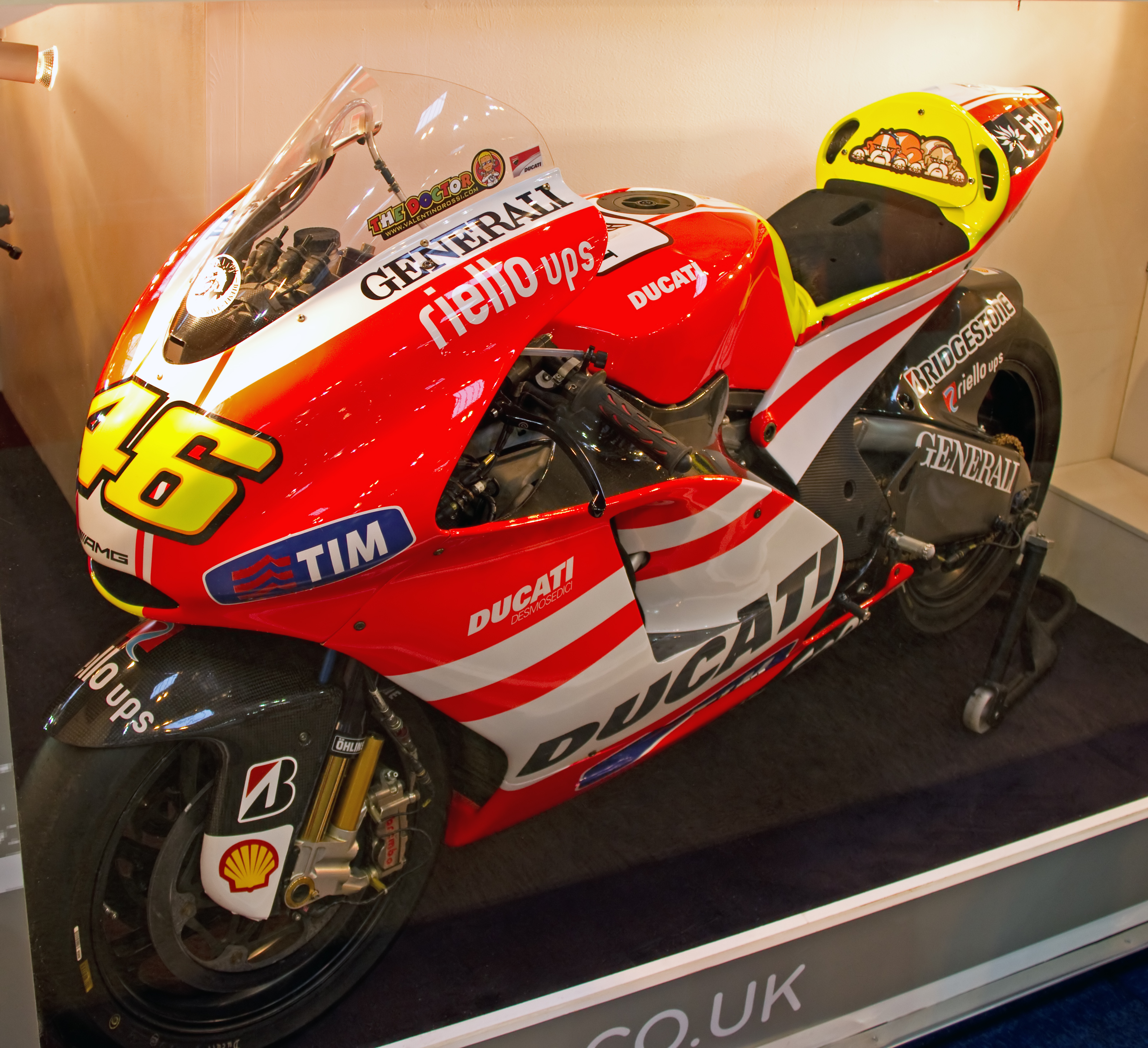
The Ducati Desmosedici GP11, ridden by Valentino Rossi in the 2011 season on display.

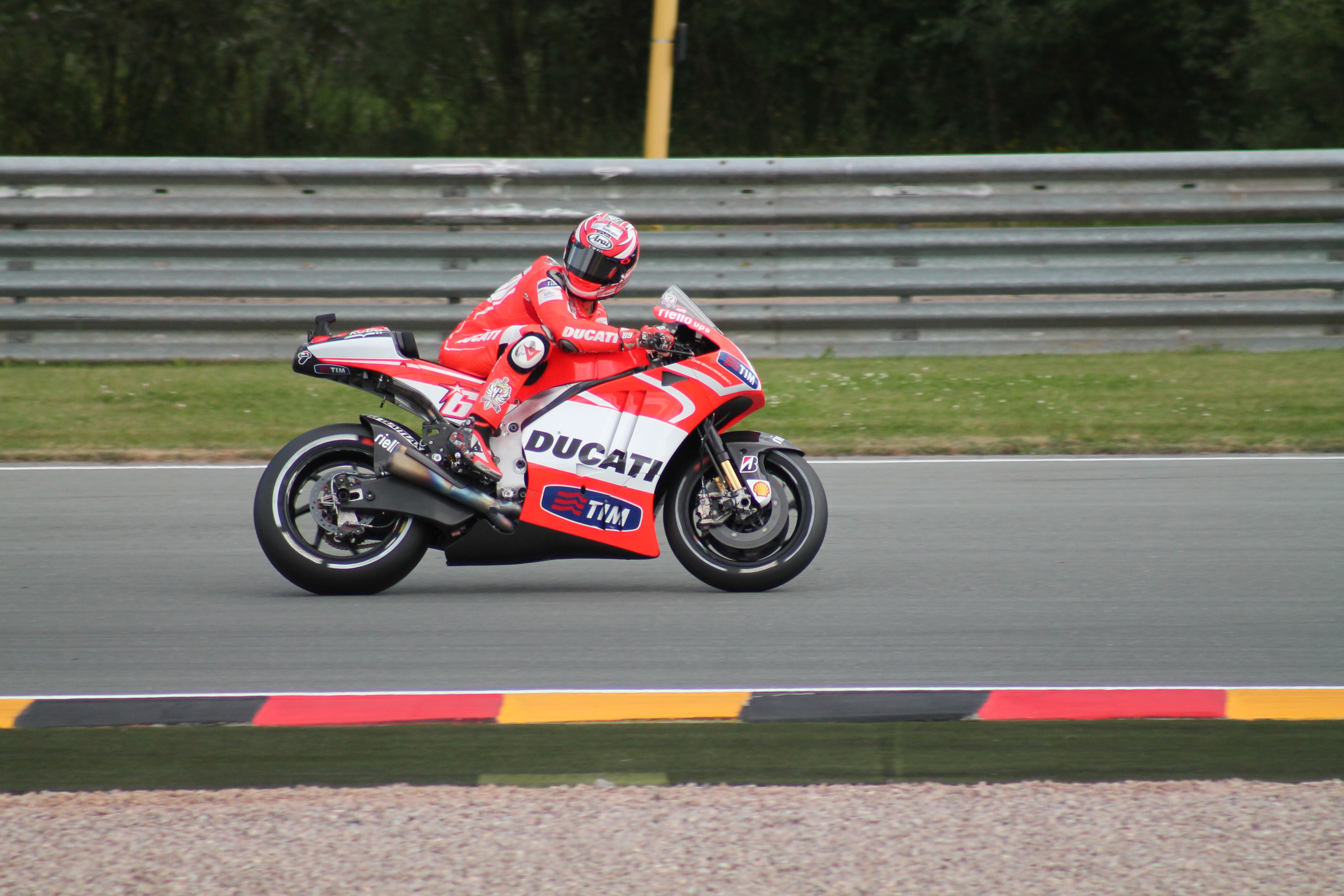
Nicky Hayden on his Ducati Desmosedici GP13, qualifying for the 2013 German Grand Prix.

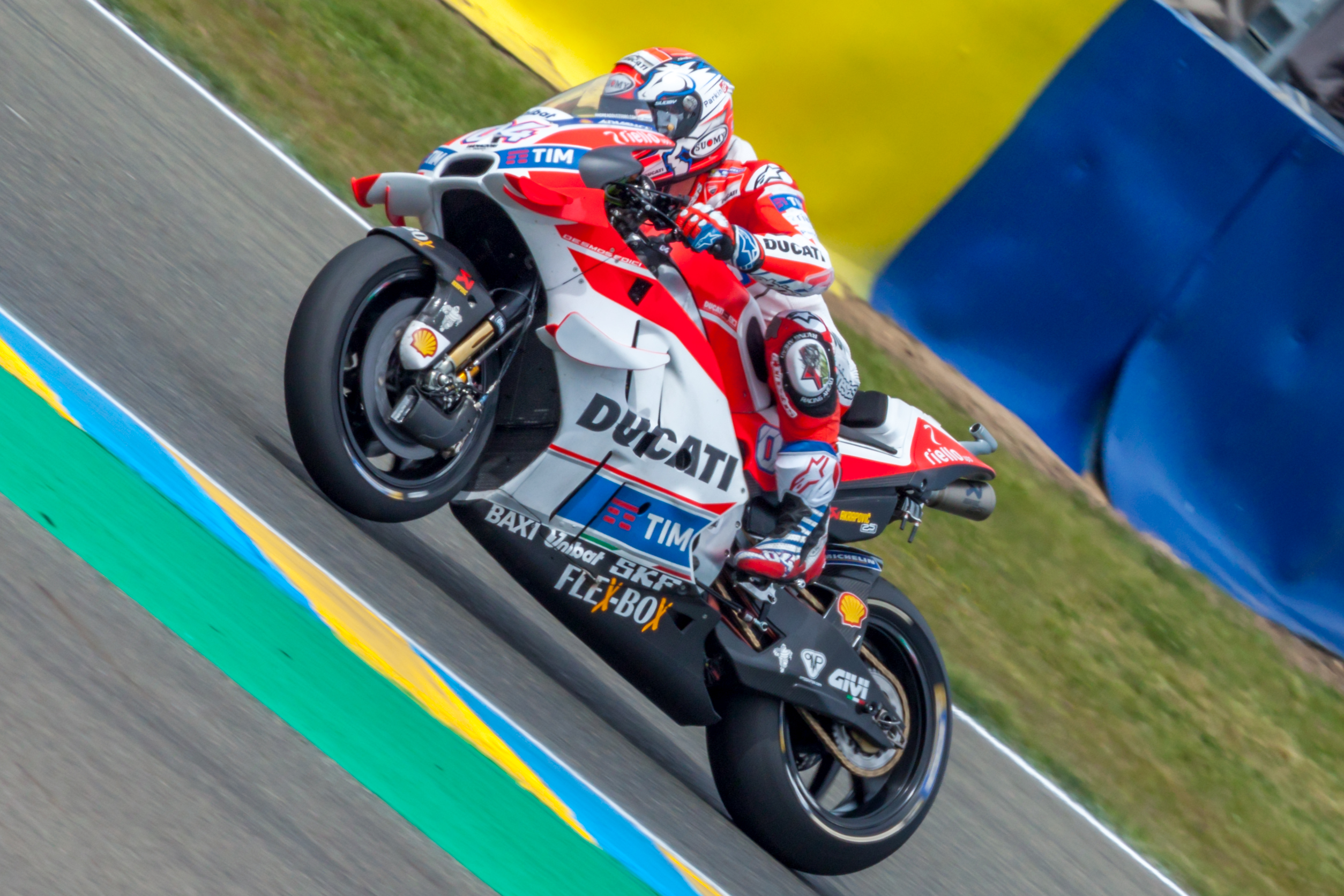
Andrea Dovizioso riding the 2016 Ducati Desmosedici GP16 in France. Note the unusual "aeroplane" winglets.

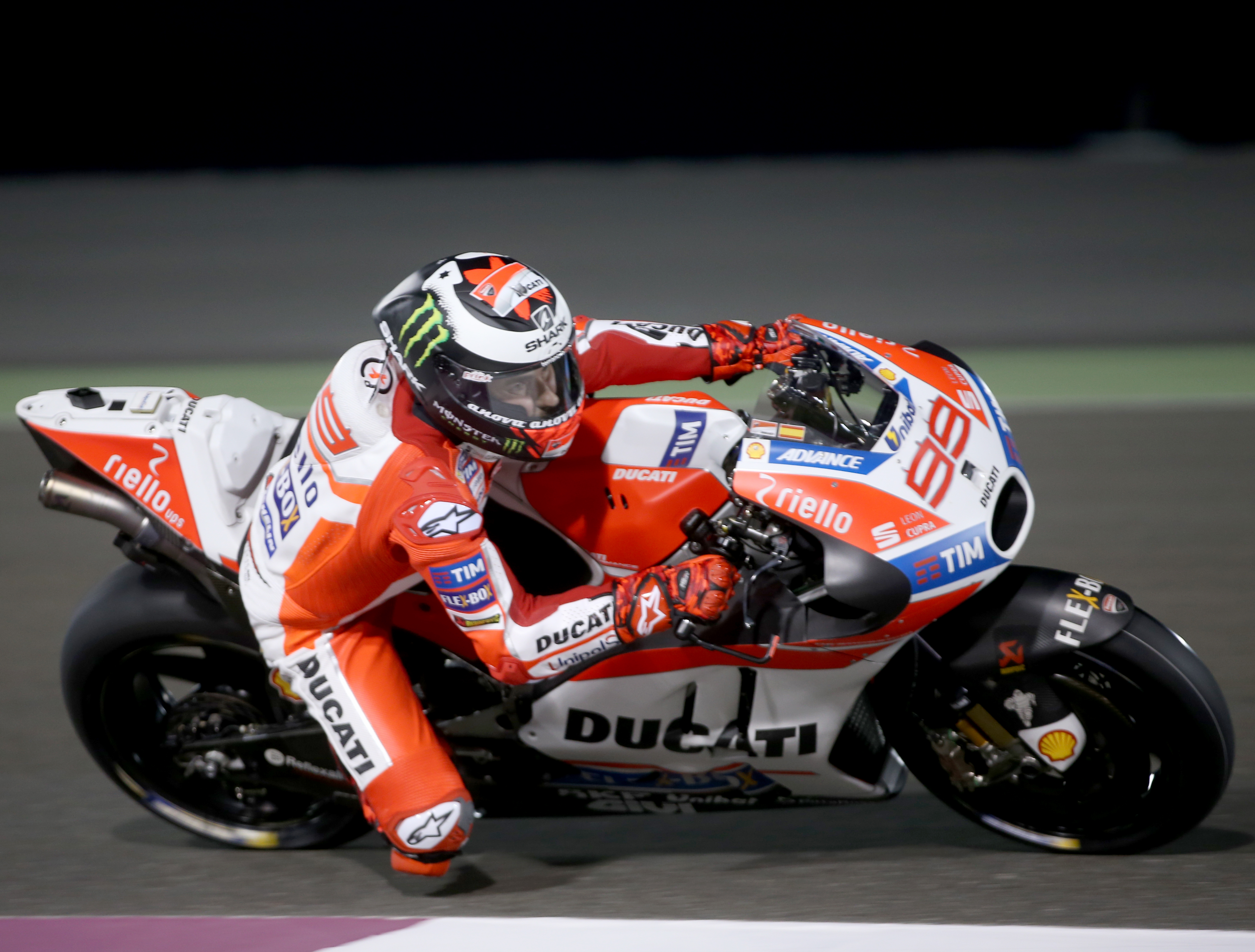
Jorge Lorenzo riding his 2017 Ducati Desmosedici GP17 in Qatar.

== Gresini Racing ==
=== MotoGP/500cc ===
Year	Main colour(s)	Additional colour(s)	Main sponsor(s)	Additional major sponsor(s)	Notes
1997	Green	Yellow, Blue, White	Rio	Michelin, Honda, Mokador, Mobil, Vetroresina	
1998	Green	Yellow, Blue, White	Rio	Michelin, Honda, Mokador, Mobil, Chiaravalli, Stafer	
2002	Silver	Red, Black	Fortuna	Honda, Michelin, Vetroresina, Piolanti, Verlicchi	Fortuna names and logos replaced with "Spain's N°1" logos in countries where tobacco sponsorship is forbidden.
2003	Blue, yellow	Green	Telefónica, Movistar	Castrol, Michelin, Honda	
2004	Blue, yellow	Green	Telefónica, Movistar	Castrol, Michelin, Honda, Seven, Black Prince	
2005	Blue, yellow	Green	Movistar	Castrol, Michelin, Honda, Seven, Black Prince	
2006	Red, yellow	White, Green	Movistar	Castrol, Michelin, Honda, Valsir, Polini	Fortuna names and logos replaced with "Spain's N°1" logos in countries where tobacco sponsorship is forbidden.
2007	Blue	White, Green	Hannspree	Castrol, Bridgestone, Honda, Valsir, Polini, Morellato, Agos, San Carlo, Manpower	
2008	White	Red, Black, Green	San Carlo	Castrol, Bridgestone, Honda, Morellato, ZEC, Manpower	
2009	White	Red, Black, Green	San Carlo	Castrol, Bridgestone, Honda	
2010	White	Red, Green	San Carlo	Castrol, Bridgestone, Honda, Agos, Ducato	
2011	White	Red, Green	San Carlo	Castrol, Bridgestone, Honda, Agos, Ducato, BigMat	
2012 (Early season)	Black	White, Red, Green	San Carlo	Castrol, Bridgestone, Honda, Agos, Barracuda, Blauer, Ducato	
2012 (Later season)	White	Red, Green	San Carlo	Castrol, Bridgestone, Honda, Agos, Barracuda, Blauer, Ducato, Go&Fun	Used from the 2012 Italy Grand Prix onward.
2013	White	Light green, Green	Go&Fun	Castrol, Bridgestone, Honda, Agos, Barracuda, Blauer, Ducato	
2014	White	Light green, Green	Go&Fun	Castrol, Bridgestone, Honda, Agos, Barracuda, Blauer, Ducato	
2015	Silver	Black, Red	None	Aprilia, Bridgestone, Barracuda	
2016	Silver	Red, Green, Black	Piagio Group	Aprilia, Dell'Orto, Barracuda, Inox Cneter, Motul, Marsh, Michelin, SAP	
2017-2018	Red	White, Green, Navy blue	NOW TV	Aprilia, Piaggio Group, Motul, Experis, Inox Center, Marsh, Fast & Fresco, PBR, Akrapovic, SAP	
2019-2020	Black	Red, White, Green, Yellow	Sky Q	Aprilia, Piaggio Group, Unibat, Boost Italian Mood, Gulf Oil, Star, Dell'Orto, MIchelin, Utility Diadora	
2021	Black	Red, White, Green	Sky Q	Aprilia, Piaggio Group, Came, Castrol, Michelin, Experis, Fiat Powertrain Technologies, Indonesian Racing, Dell'Orto, Unibat, Marsh, Kaspersky	
2022	Silver	Red, Black	The Next	Ducati, Oli, Federal Oil, Aspira, Kapriol, Michelin, Risposta, Uma Racing, Antangin, Bold Riders, GIgetta, Unibat, You-All, Bacio della Luna	

Daijiro Kato's 2002 Honda NSR500 for the first MotoGP season, with the Fortuna livery, before it was swtiched to the four-stroke RC211V mid-season.

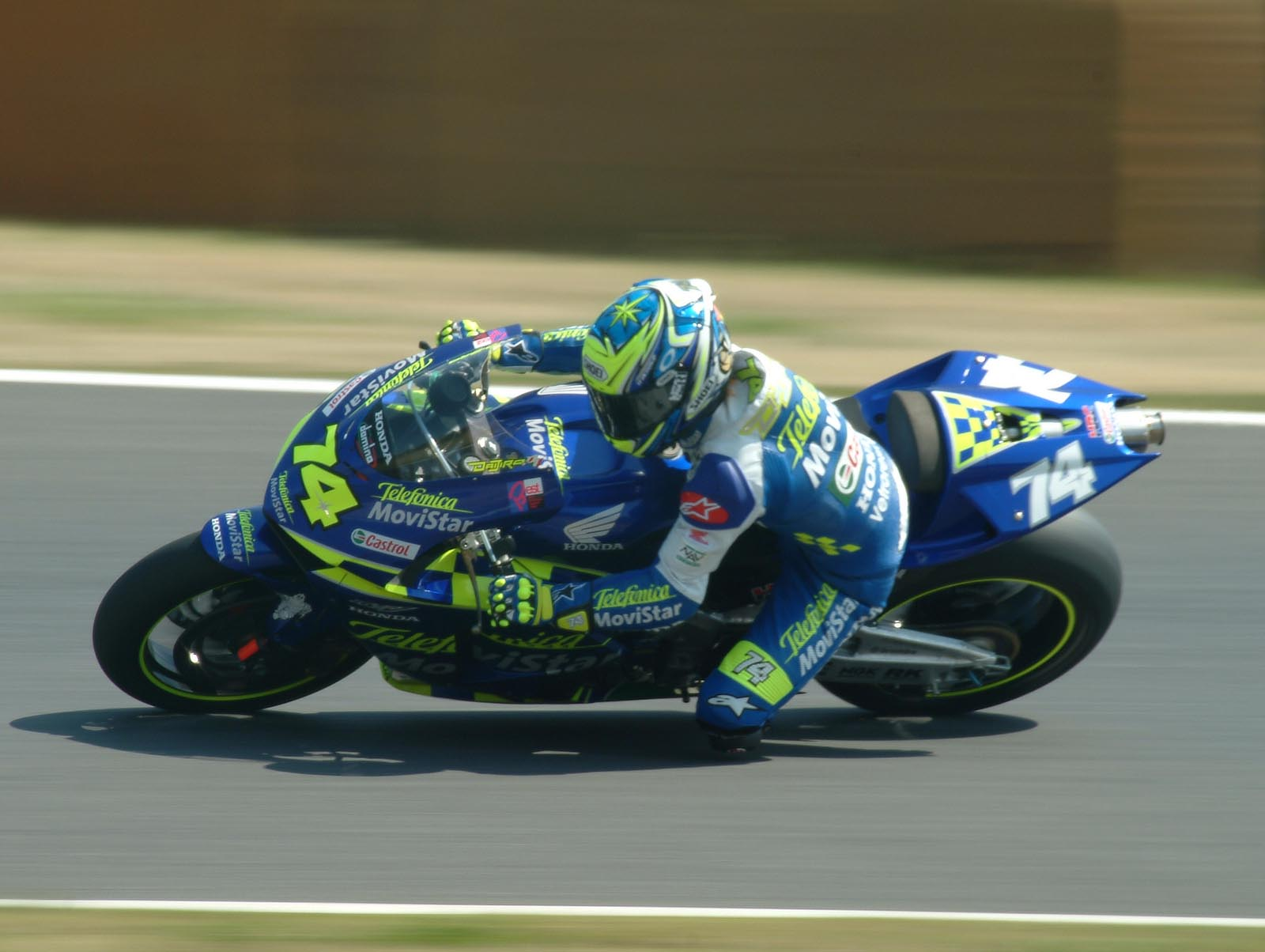
Daijiro Kato riding his Honda RC211v at the 2003 Japanese Grand Prix in Suzuka, which would be his last race due to his fatal accident during the race. In 2003, Gresini Racing signed with Telefonica Movistar as their main sponsor for three years.

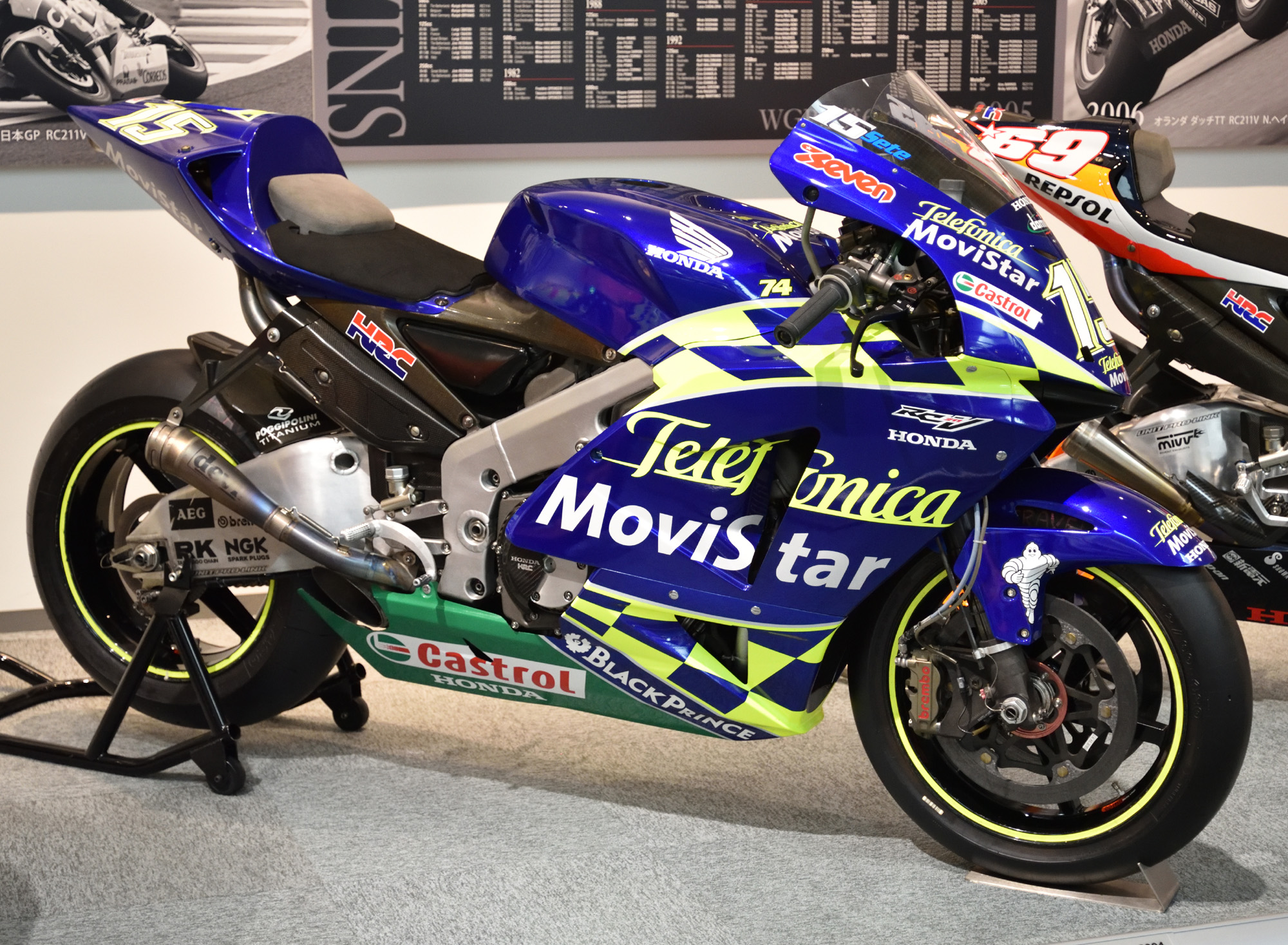
Sete Gibernau's 2004 Honda RC211V with its Telefonica Movistar livery on display

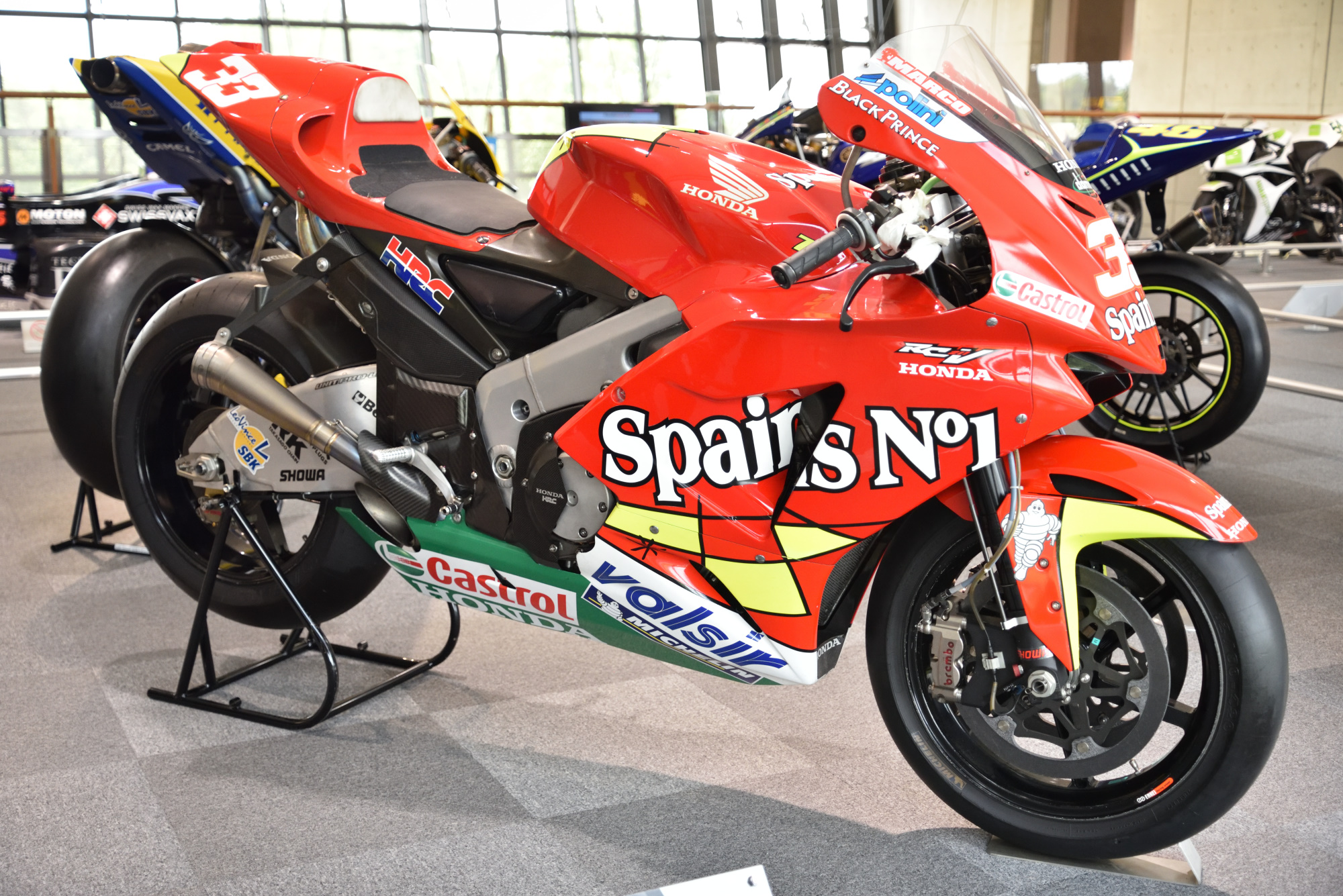
Marco Melandri's 2006 Honda RC211V with its Fortuna livery, with Fortuna returning to sponsor Gresini Racing after 3 years

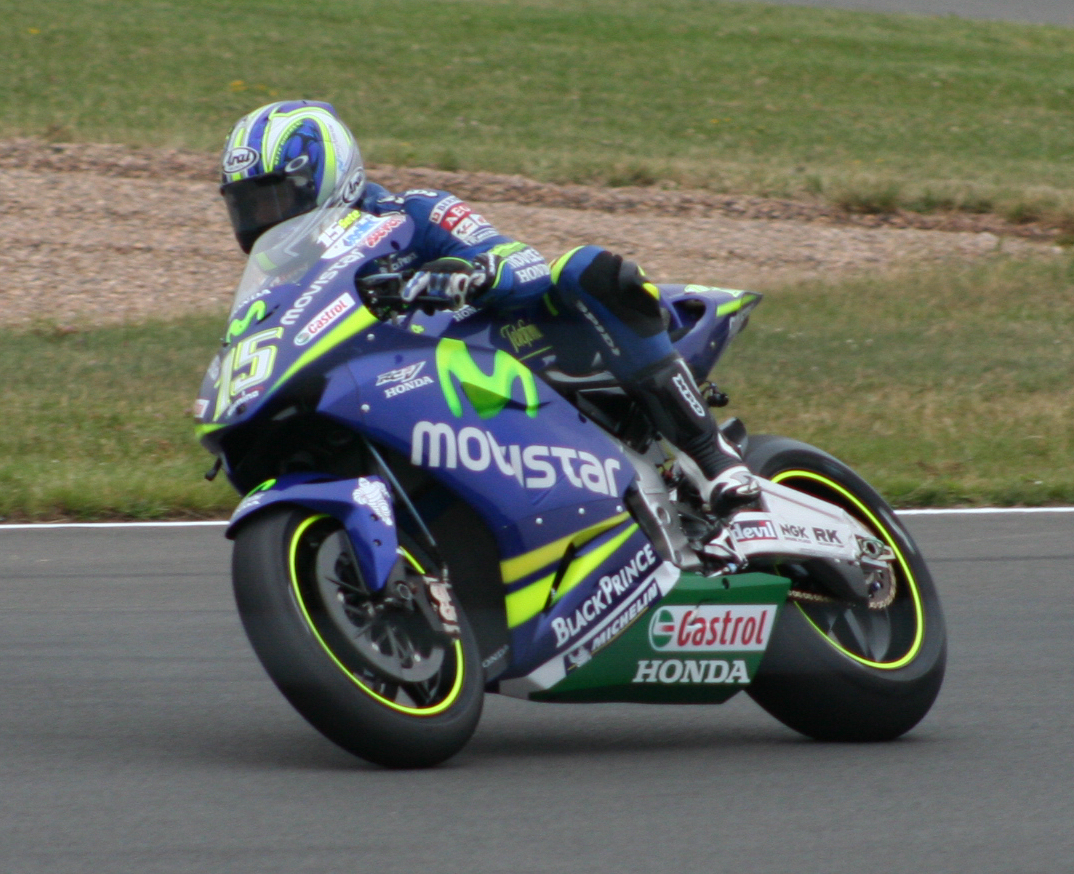
Sete Gibernau riding his Movistar-liveried Honda RC211V at the 2005 British Grand Prix.

== Honda Racing Corporation ==
Honda Racing Corporation (HRC) is a division of the Honda Motor Company formed in 1982. The company combines participation in motorcycle races throughout the world with the development of high potential racing machines. Its racing activities are an important source for the creation of leading edge technologies used in the development of Honda motorcycles. HRC also contributes to the advancement of motorcycle sports through a range of activities that include sales of production racing motorcycles, support for satellite teams, and rider education programs.

In 1979, Honda returned to Grand Prix motorcycle racing with the monocoque-framed, four-stroke NR500. The FIM rules limited engines to four cylinders, so the NR500 had non-circular, 'race-track', cylinders, each with 8 valves and two connecting rods, in order to provide sufficient valve area to compete with the dominant two-stroke racers. Unfortunately, it seemed Honda tried to accomplish too much at one time and the experiment failed. For the 1982 season, Honda debuted their first two-stroke race bike, the NS500 and in 1983, Honda won their first 500 cc Grand Prix World Championship with Freddie Spencer. Since then, Honda has become a dominant marque in motorcycle Grand Prix racing, winning a plethora of top level titles with riders such as Mick Doohan and Valentino Rossi.

=== 500cc/MotoGP ===
Year	Main colour(s)	Additional colour(s)	Main sponsor(s)	Additional major sponsor(s)	Notes
1979	Red	Blue, white, yellow	None	Dunlop, Castrol, NGK, Sarome, Z Parts, Kiwi Helmets	the Sarome and Z Parts logos were present on Katayama's bike, the Kiwi Helmet logo was present on Grant's bike
1980	Red	Blue, white, yellow	None	Nava Helmets, Brembo, NGK, Castrol, Michelin	The Nava Helmets was present on Katayama's bike
1981	Red	White, yellow	None	Nava Helmets, Castrol, NGK, Michelin, Showa, Keihin, Arai Helmets	The Nava Helmets logo was present on Katayama's bike, while the Arai Helmets logo was present on Spencers bike
1982	Red	Blue, white, yellow	None	Michelin, Castrol, NGK, OKI, RK Takasago Chain, Keihin, Showa	
1983	Red	Blue, white, yellow	None	Michelin, Castrol, NGK, RK Takasago Chain, Keihin, Showa	
1984	Blue	Red, white, yellow	None	Michelin, RK Takasago Chain, NGK, OKI, Keihin, Castrol	
1985	Blue	White, gold, red, yellow	Rothmans	Michelin, Castrol, RK Takasago Chain, NGK, SAK, AFAM, Keihin, Showa	
1986	Blue	White, gold, red, yellow	Rothmans	Michelin, Shell, RK Takasago Chain, NGK, SAK, AFAM, Keihin, Showa	
1987	Blue	White, gold, red, yellow	Rothmans	Michelin, Shell, RK Takasago Chain, NGK, SAK, AFAM, Keihin, Showa	
1988	Blue	White, gold, red, yellow	Rothmans	Michelin, Shell, RK Takasago Chain, NGK, SAK, AFAM, Showa	
1989	Blue	White, gold, red, yellow	Rothmans	Michelin, Shell, Elf, RK Takasago Chain, NGK, SAK, AFAM, Keihin, ICI, Showa	
1990	Blue	White, gold, red, yellow	Rothmans	Michelin, Elf, RK Takasago Chain, NGK, SAK, AFAM, Showa	
1991	Blue	White, gold, red, yellow	Rothmans	Michelin, Elf, RK Takasago Chain, NGK, SAK, AFAM, Showa	
1992	Blue	White, gold, red, yellow	Rothmans	Michelin, Elf, RK Takasago Chain, NGK, SAK, AFAM, Castrol, Showa	
1993	Blue	White, gold, red, yellow	Rothmans	Michelin, Elf, RK Takasago Chain, Brembo, NGK, SAK, AFAM, Showa	
1994	Red	White, blue	None	Michelin, Elf, RK Takasago Chain, Brembo, NGK, SAK, AFAM, Showa	
1995	Dark blue	Orange, red, white	Repsol	Michelin, Benetton Sport System, RK Takasago Chain, AFAM, Brembo, NGK, SAK, Keihin, Showa	
1996	Dark blue	Orange, red, white	Repsol	Michelin, Benetton Sport System, RK Takasago Chain, AFAM, Brembo, NGK, SAK, Keihin, Showa	
1997	Dark blue	Orange, red, white	Repsol	Michelin, Benetton Sport System, RK Takasago Chain, AFAM, Brembo, NGK, SAK, Keihin, Showa, Arrow	
1998	Dark blue	Orange, red, white	Repsol	Michelin, Gas Jeans, Snap-on, RK Takasago Chain, AFAM, Brembo, NGK, SAK, Keihin, Showa, Arrow	
1999	Dark blue	Orange, red, white	Repsol	Michelin, Gas Jeans, Snap-on, RK Takasago Chain, AFAM, Brembo, NGK, SAK, Showa, Arrow	
2000	Dark blue	Orange, red, white	Repsol, YPF	Michelin, Gas Jeans, RK Takasago Chain, AFAM, Brembo, NGK, SAK, Snap-on, Showa, Arrow	
2001	Dark blue, white	Orange, red	Repsol, YPF	Michelin, Gas Jeans, RK Takasago Chain, AFAM, Brembo, NGK, SAK, Snap-on, Showa, Arrow	
2001	Dark blue	Orange, red, white	Repsol	Michelin, Gas Jeans, RK Takasago Chain, AFAM, Brembo, NGK, SAK, Snap-on, Showa, Polini	
2002	Black	Orange, red, white	Repsol	Michelin, Gas Jeans, RK Takasago Chain, AFAM, Brembo, NGK, SAK, Snap-on, Showa	
2003	Black	Orange, red, white	Repsol	Michelin, Gas Jeans, RK Takasago Chain, AFAM, Brembo, NGK, SAK, Snap-on, Showa	
2004	Black	Orange, red, white	Repsol	Michelin, Gas Jeans, RK Takasago Chain, AFAM, Brembo, NGK, SAK, Snap-on, Showa	
2005	Black	Orange, red, white	Repsol	Michelin, PlayStation 2, Gas Jeans, RK Takasago Chain, AFAM, Brembo, NGK, SAK, Snap-on, Showa	
2006	Black	Orange, red, white	Repsol	Michelin, Gas Jeans, Brembo, RK Takasago Chain, NGK, Shindengen, Snap-on, Showa	
2007	Black	Orange, red, white	Repsol	Michelin, Gas Jeans, Brembo, RK Takasago Chain, NGK, Shindengen, Snap-on, Showa	
2008	Black	Orange, red, white	Repsol	Bridgestone, Gas Jeans, RK Takasago Chain, NGK, Shindengen, Snap-on, Mivv, Brembo, Showa	
2009	Black	Orange, red, white	Repsol	Bridgestone, Gas Jeans, RK Takasago Chain, NGK, Shindengen, Snap-on, Mivv, Showa	
2010	Black	Orange, red, white	Repsol	Bridgestone, Gas Jeans, RK Takasago Chain, NGK, Shindengen, Snap-on, Mivv, Öhlins	
2011	Black	Orange, red, white	Repsol	Bridgestone, One Heart, Gas Jeans, RK Takasago Chain, NGK, Shindengen, Termignoni, Brembo, Öhlins	
2012	Black	Orange, red, white	Repsol	Bridgestone, One Heart, Gas Jeans, Snap-on, Yutaka, RK Takasago Chain, NGK, Shindengen, Brembo, Öhlins	
2013	Orange	Black, red, white	Repsol	Bridgestone, One Heart, Gas Jeans, Snap-on, Yutaka, RK Takasago Chain, NGK, Shindengen, Termignoni, Brembo, Öhlins	
2014	Orange	Black, red, white	Repsol	Bridgestone, One Heart, Gas Jeans, Snap-on, Yutaka, RK Takasago Chain, NGK, Shindengen, Termignoni, Brembo, Öhlins	
2015	Orange	Black, red, white	Repsol	Bridgestone, Red Bull, One Heart, Satu Hati, Snap-on, Yutaka, ASICS, RK Takasago Chain, NGK, Shindengen, Termignoni, Brembo, Öhlins	
2016	Orange	Black, red, white	Repsol	Michelin, Red Bull, One Heart, Satu Hati, Snap-on, Yutaka, ASICS, RK Takasago Chain, NGK, Shindengen, Termignoni, Gas Jeans, Brembo, Öhlins	
2017	Orange	Black, red, white	Repsol	Michelin, Red Bull, One Heart, Satu Hati, Snap-on, Yutaka, ASICS, RK Takasago Chain, NGK, Shindengen, SC Project, Gas Jeans, Brembo, Öhlins	
2018	Orange	Black, red, white	Repsol	Michelin, Red Bull, One Heart, Satu Hati, Snap-on, Yutaka, ASICS, RK Takasago Chain, NGK, Shindengen, SC Project, Gas Jeans, Brembo, Öhlins	
2019	Orange	Black, red, white	Repsol	Michelin, Red Bull, One Heart, Satu Hati, ShinDengen, Snap-on, Yutaka, ASICS, RK Takasago Chain, NGK, RCB, SC Project, GOSHI, Brembo, Öhlins	
2021-2022	Orange	Black, red, white	Repsol	Michelin, Red Bull, One Heart, Satu Hati, ShinDengen, Snap-on, Yutaka, ASICS, RK Takasago Chain, NGK, Puig, RCB, SC Project, Brembo, Öhlins	
2023	Red	Black, orange, white	Repsol	Michelin, Red Bull, Akrapovič, One Heart, Satu Hati, ShinDengen, Snap-on, ASICS, RK Takasago Chain, NGK, Puig, RCB, Brembo, Öhlins	
2024	Black	Blue, orange, red, white	Repsol	Michelin, Red Bull, Akrapovič, One Heart, Satu Hati, ShinDengen, Snap-on, ASICS, RK Takasago Chain, NGK, Puig, RCB, Brembo, Öhlins	
2025	Red	Green, white	Castrol	Michelin, Akrapovič, One Heart, Satu Hati, ShinDengen, Snap-on, RK Takasago Chain, Mitsuba Corporation, NGK, Puig, PWR, RCB, Brembo, Öhlins	

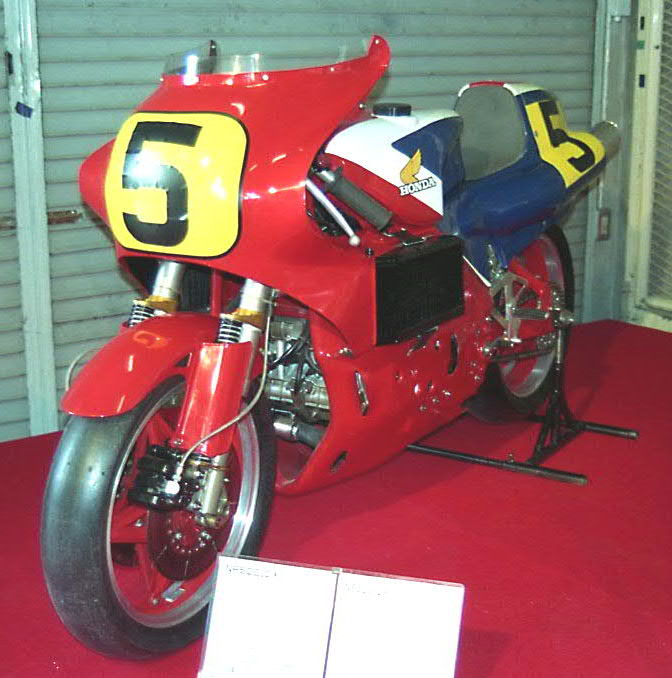
The Honda NR500, ridden by Takazumi Katayama, in the 1979 season, on display at the Suzuka Circuit.

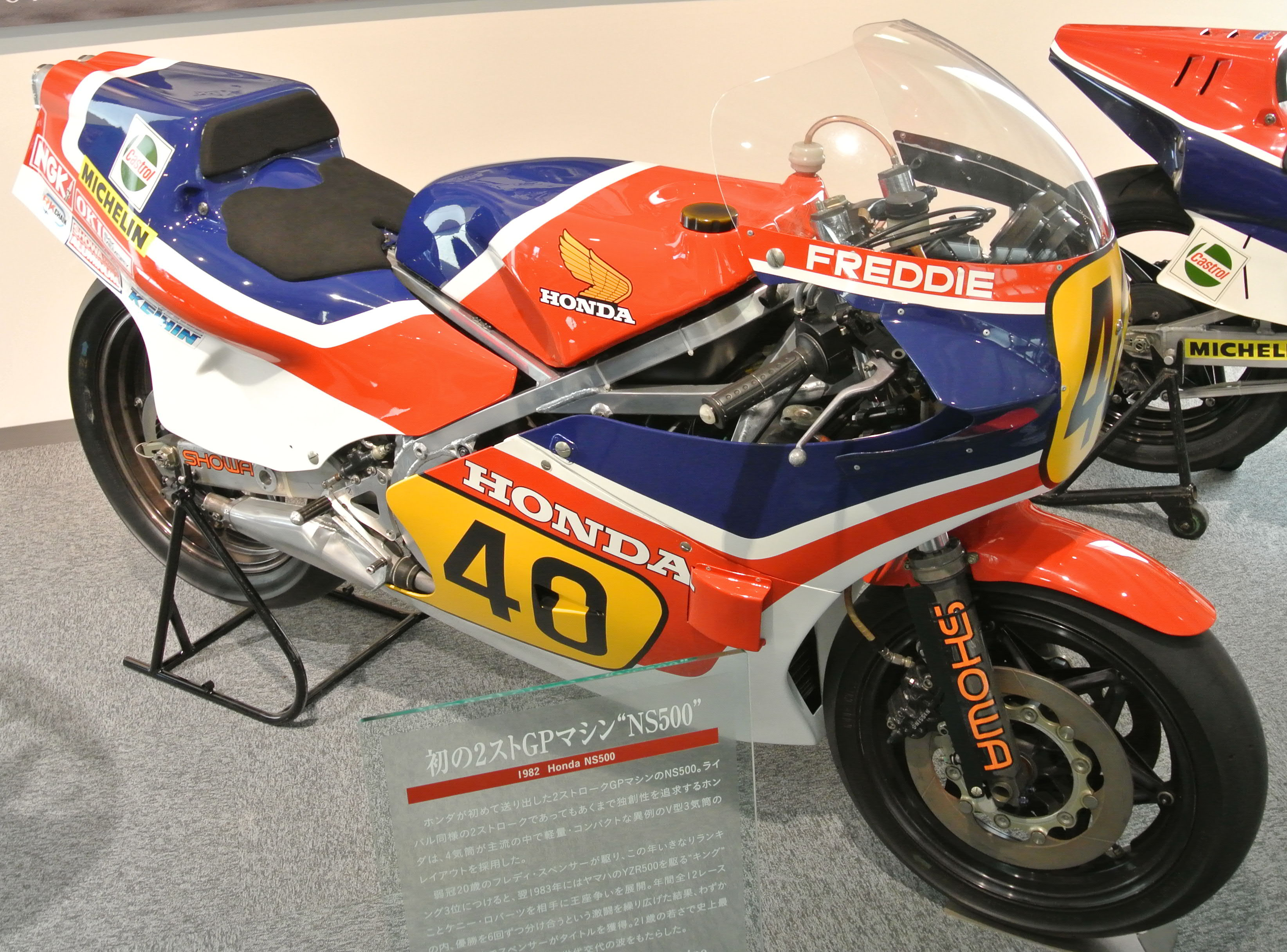
The Honda NS500, ridden by Freddie Spencer in the 1982 season on display.

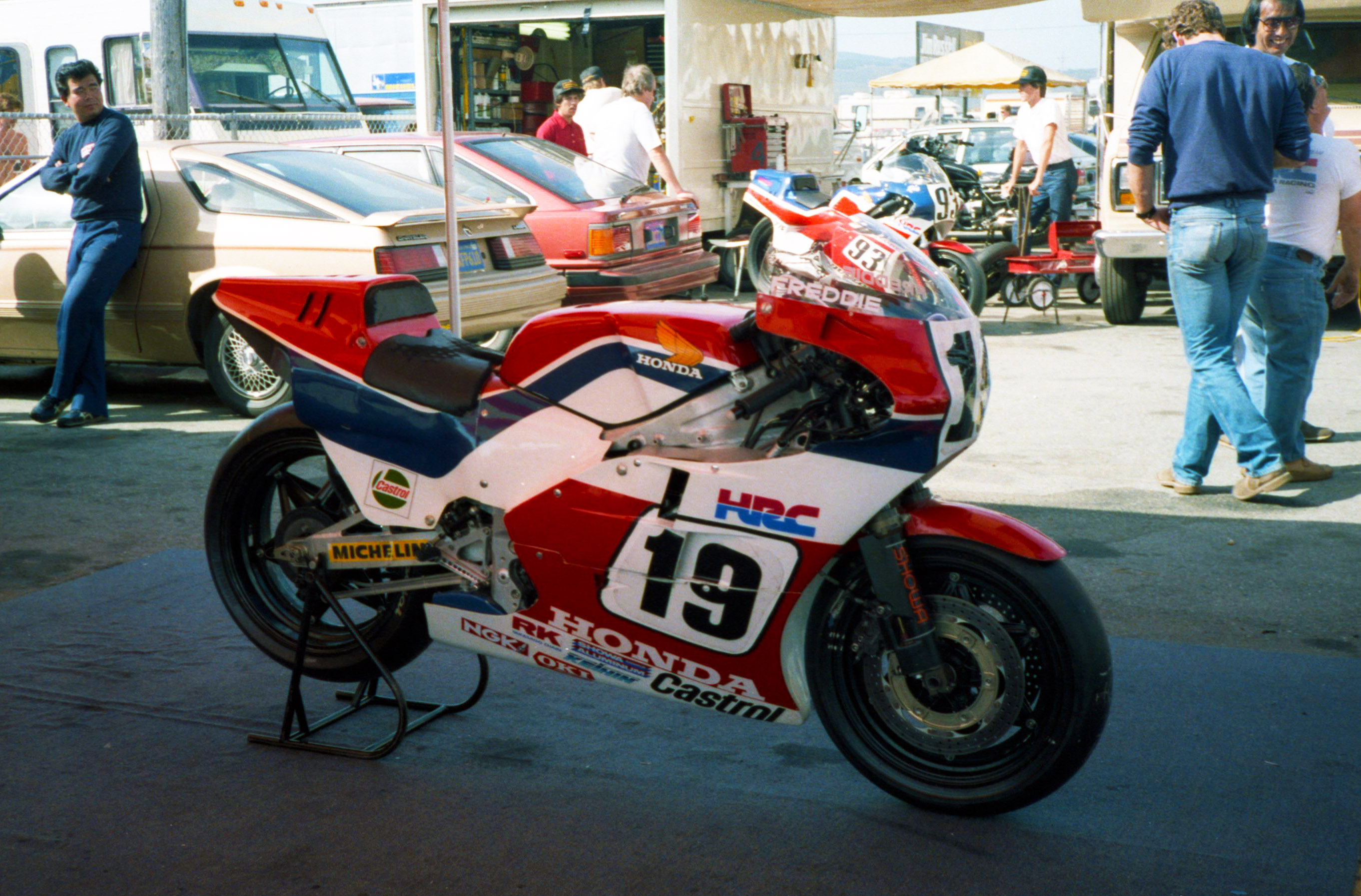
The Honda NS500, ridden by Freddie Spencer in the 1983 season on display.

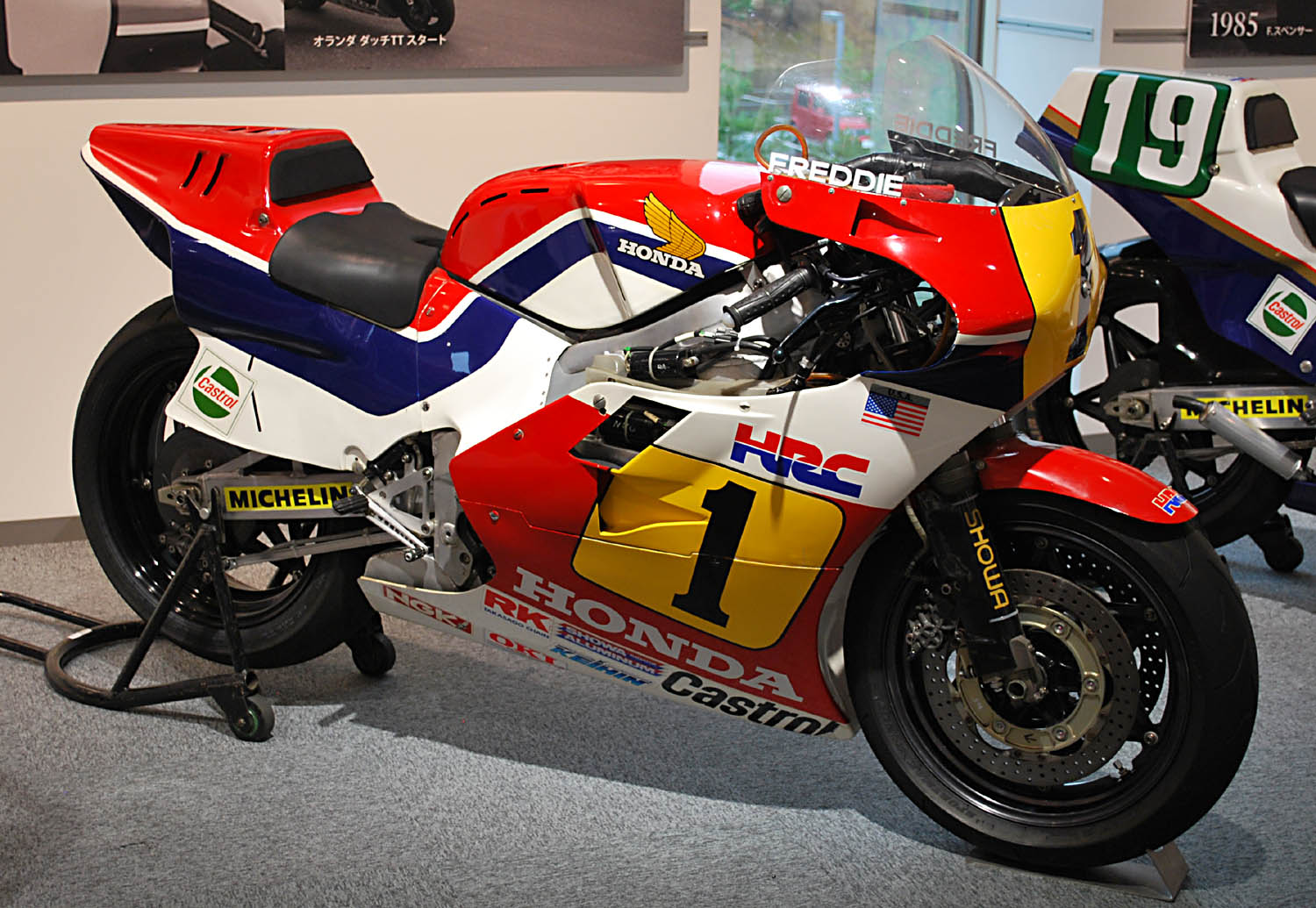
The Honda NSR500, ridden by Freddie Spencer in the 1984 season on display.

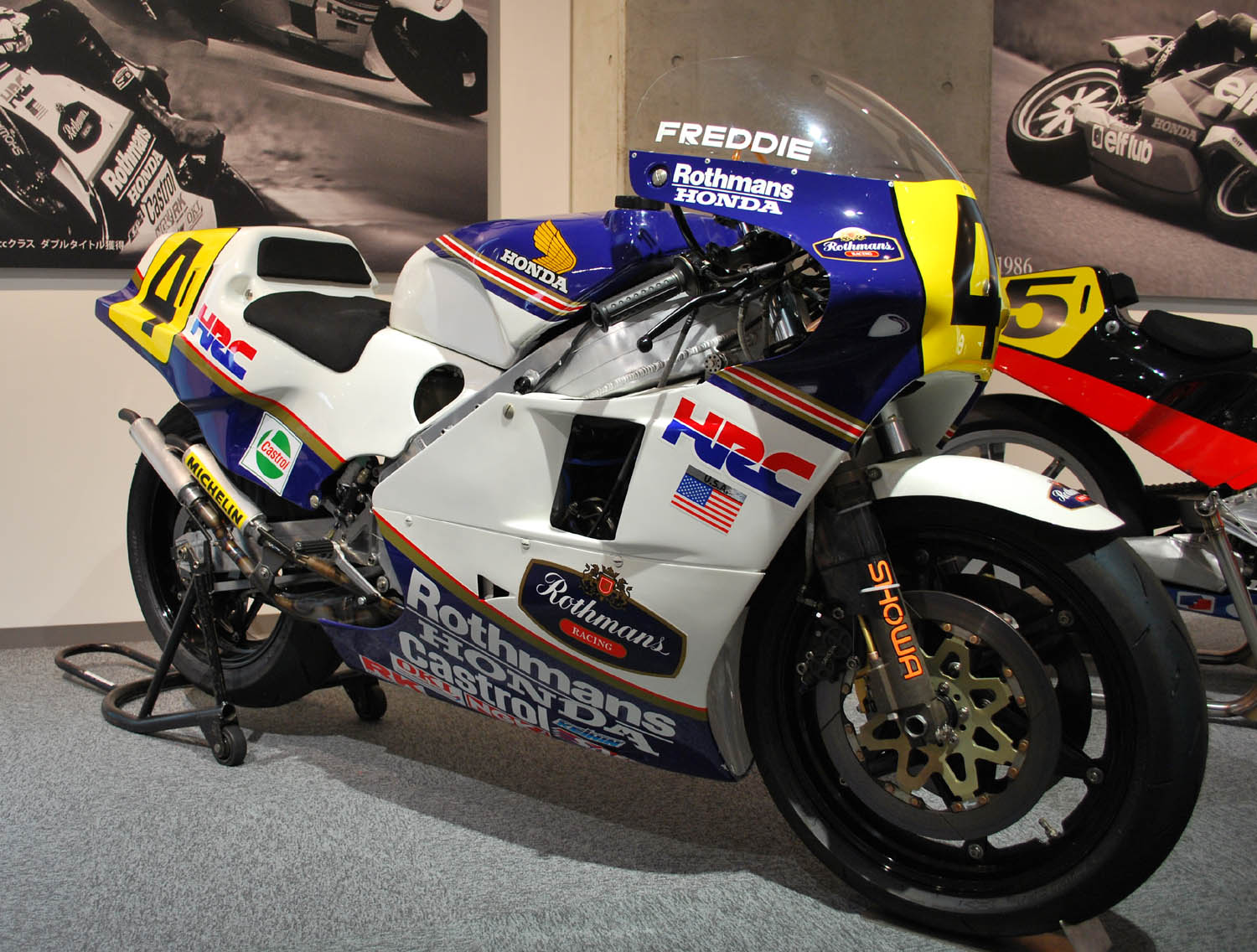
The Rothmans Honda NSR500, ridden by Freddie Spencer in the 1985 season on display.

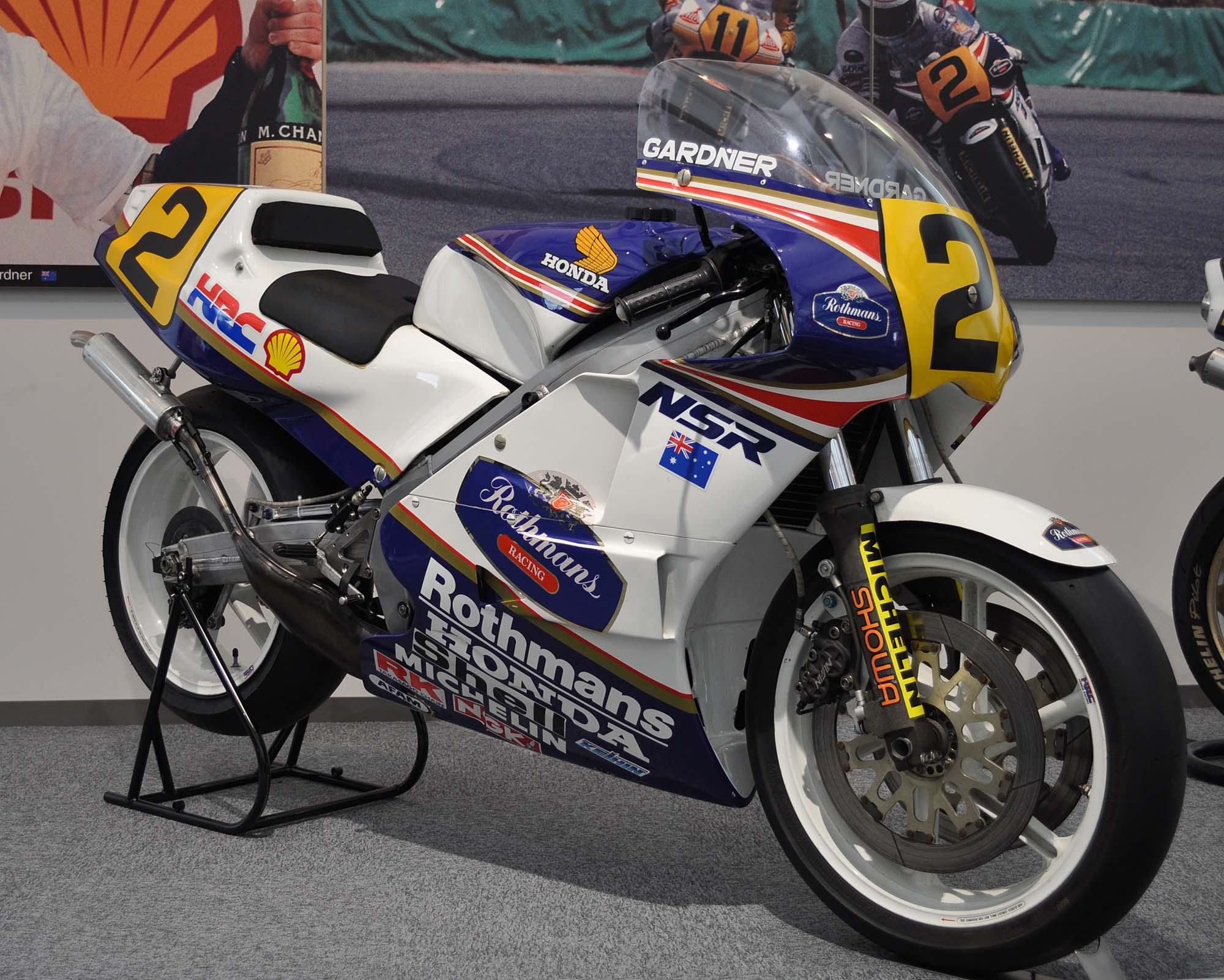
The Rothmans Honda NSR500, ridden by Wayne Gardner in the 1987 season on display.

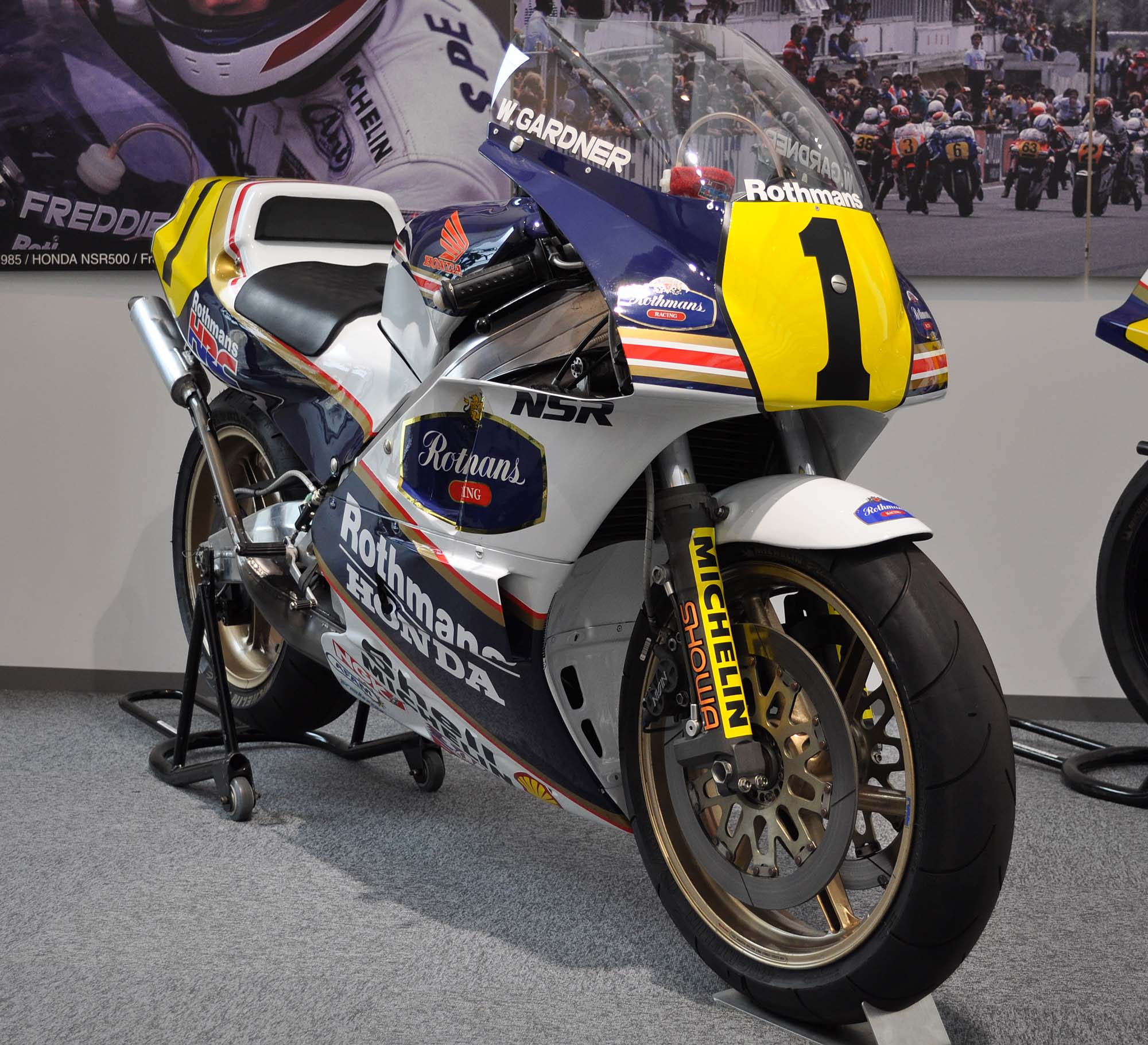
The Rothmans Honda NSR500, ridden by Wayne Gardner in the 1988 season on display.

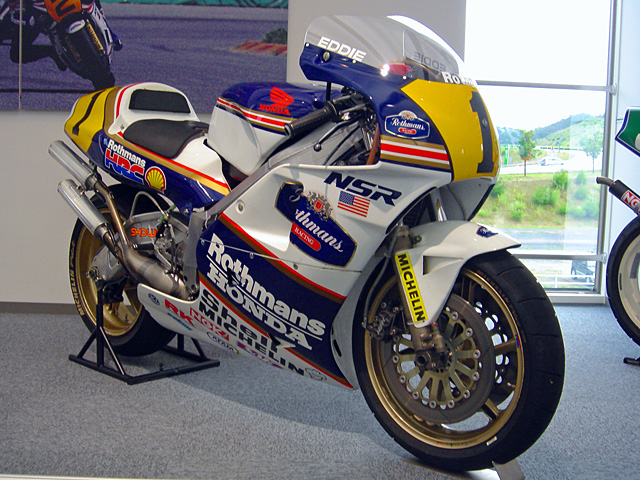
The Rothmans Honda NSR500, ridden by Eddie Lawson in the 1989 season on display.

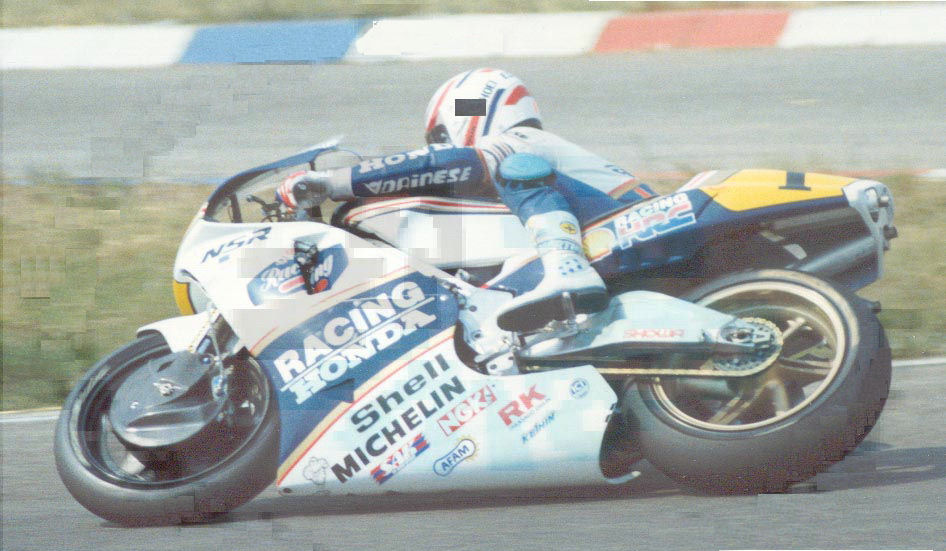
Eddie Lawson, riding his 1989 Rothmans Honda. Notice the replacement of the "Rothmans" logo's.

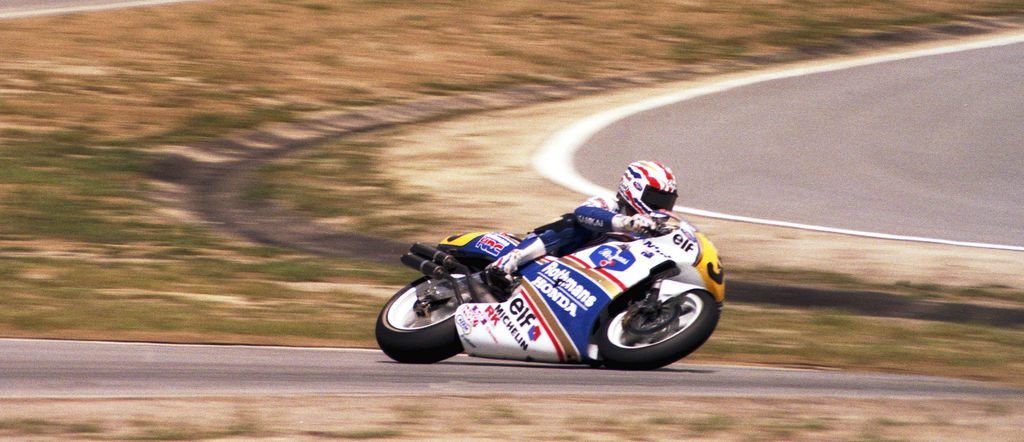
Mick Doohan, riding his Rothmans Honda NSR500 at the 1990 U.S. Grand Prix.

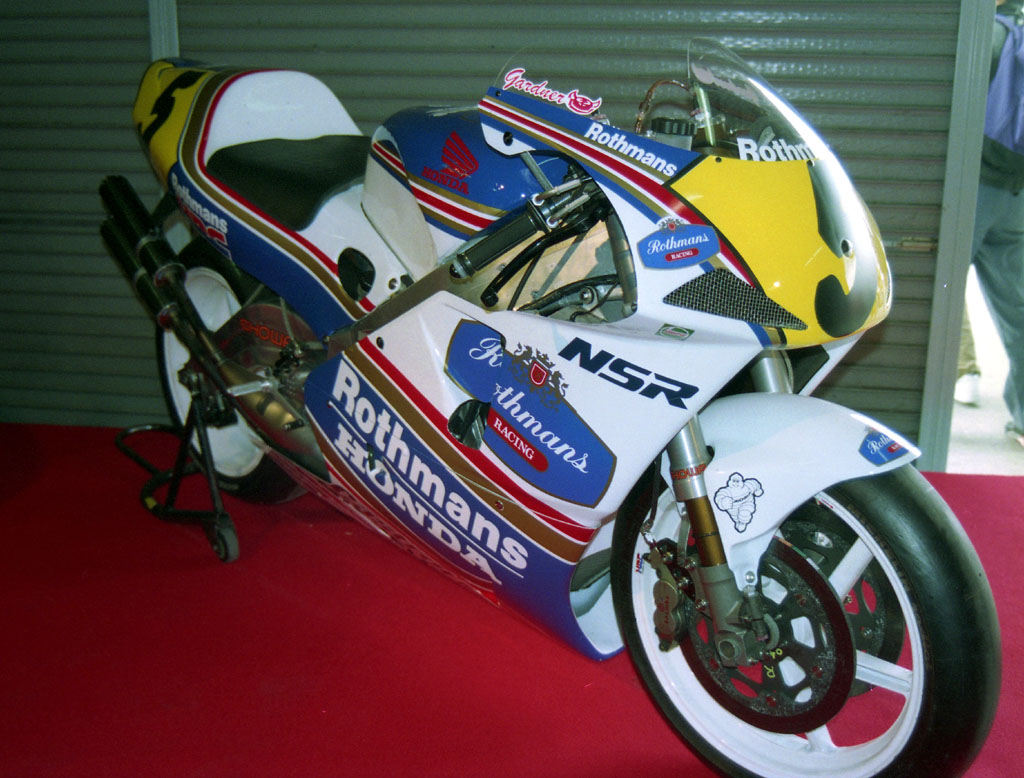
The Rothmans Honda NSR500, ridden by Wayne Gardner in the 1992 season on display.

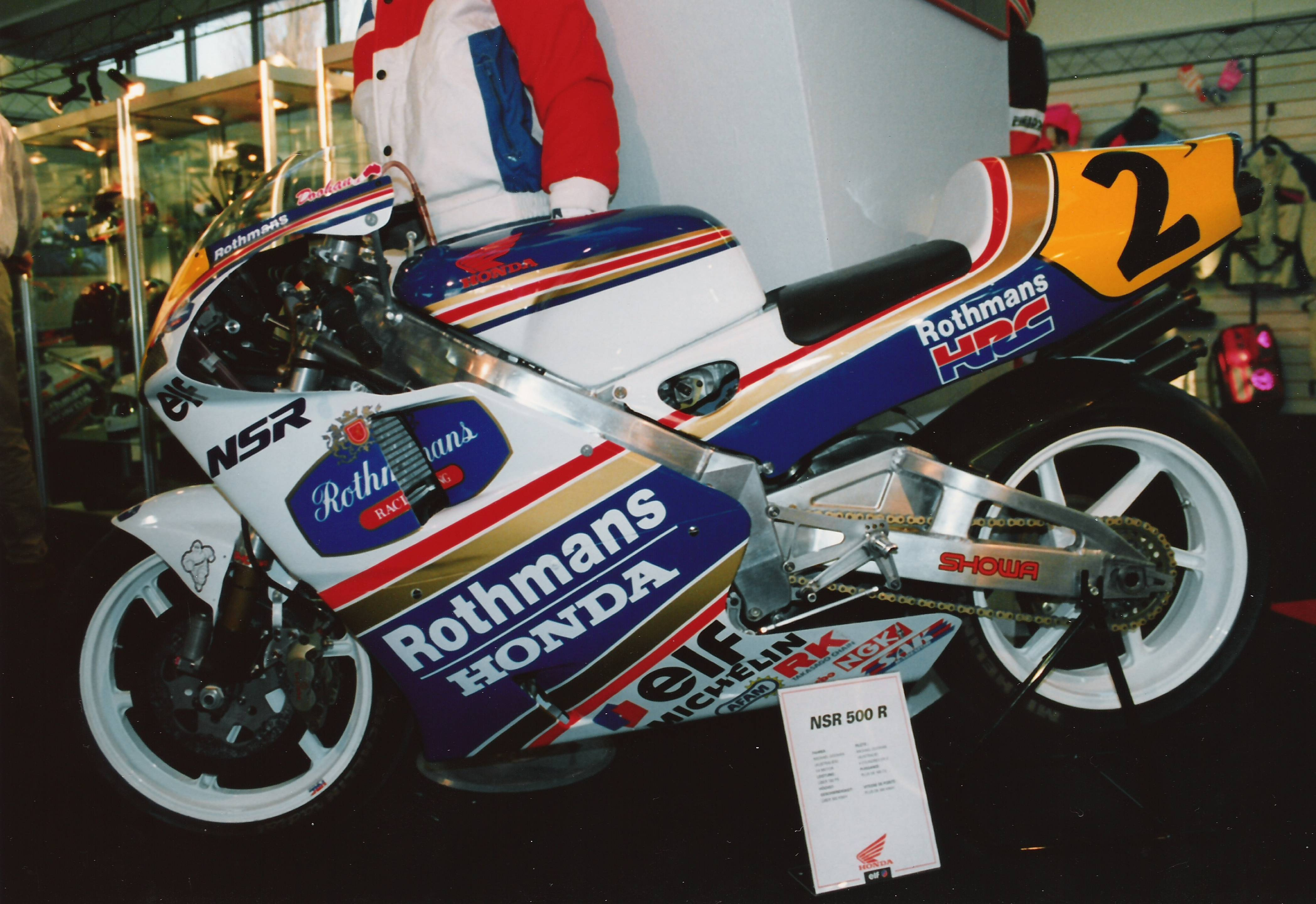
The Rothmans Honda NSR500, ridden by Mick Doohan in the 1993 season on display.

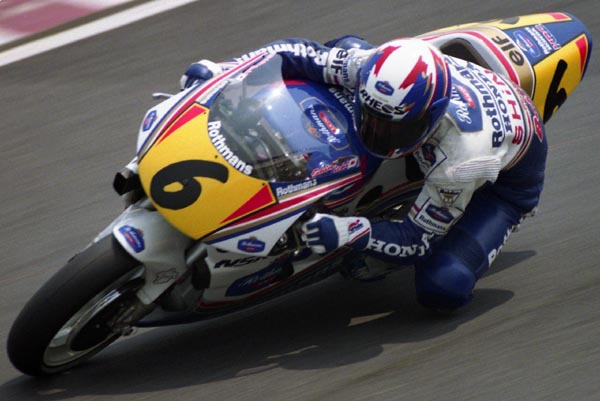
Shinichi Itoh riding his Rothmans Honda NSR500 at the 1993 Japanese Grand Prix.

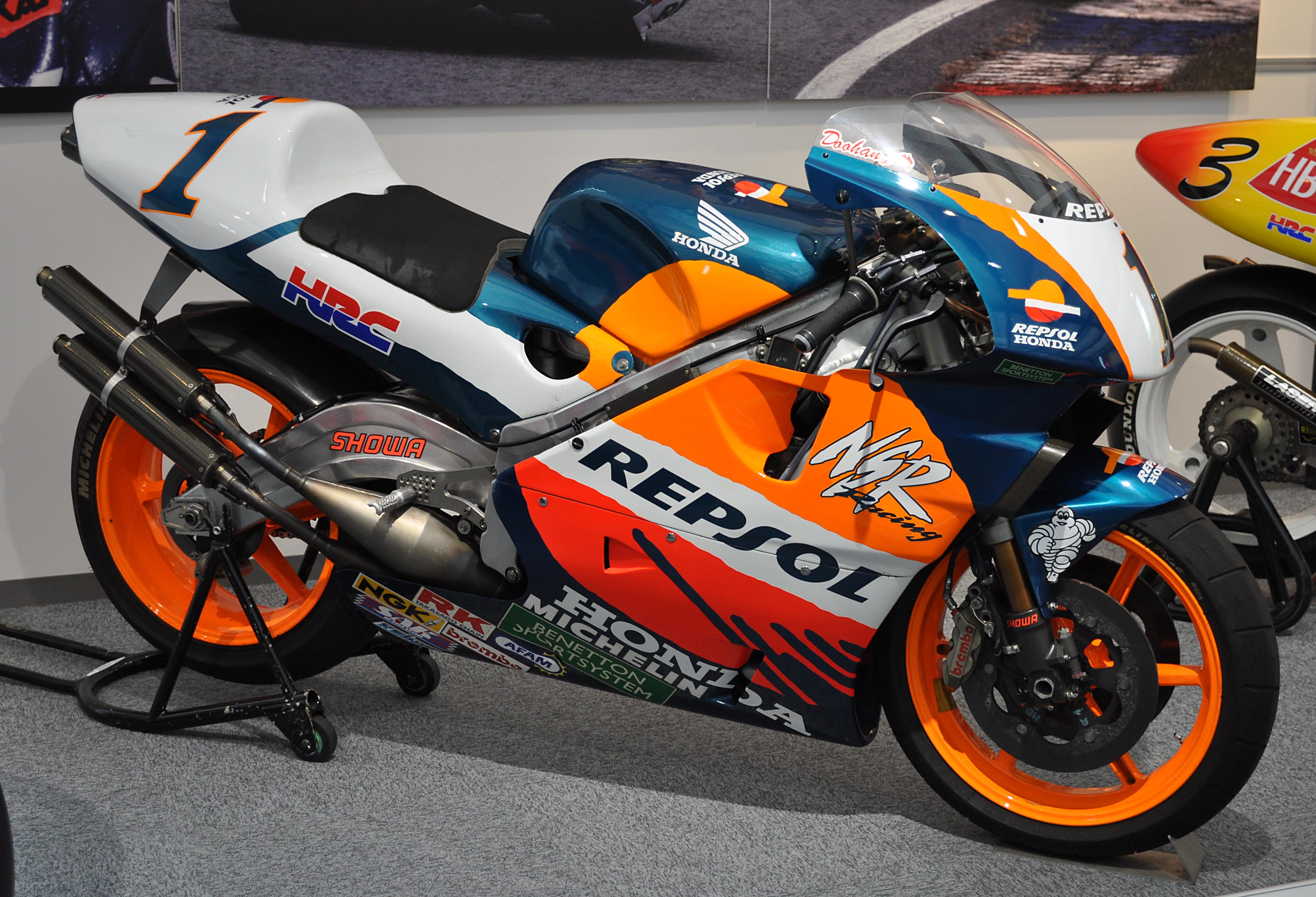
The Repsol Honda NSR500, ridden by Mick Doohan in the 1995 season on display.

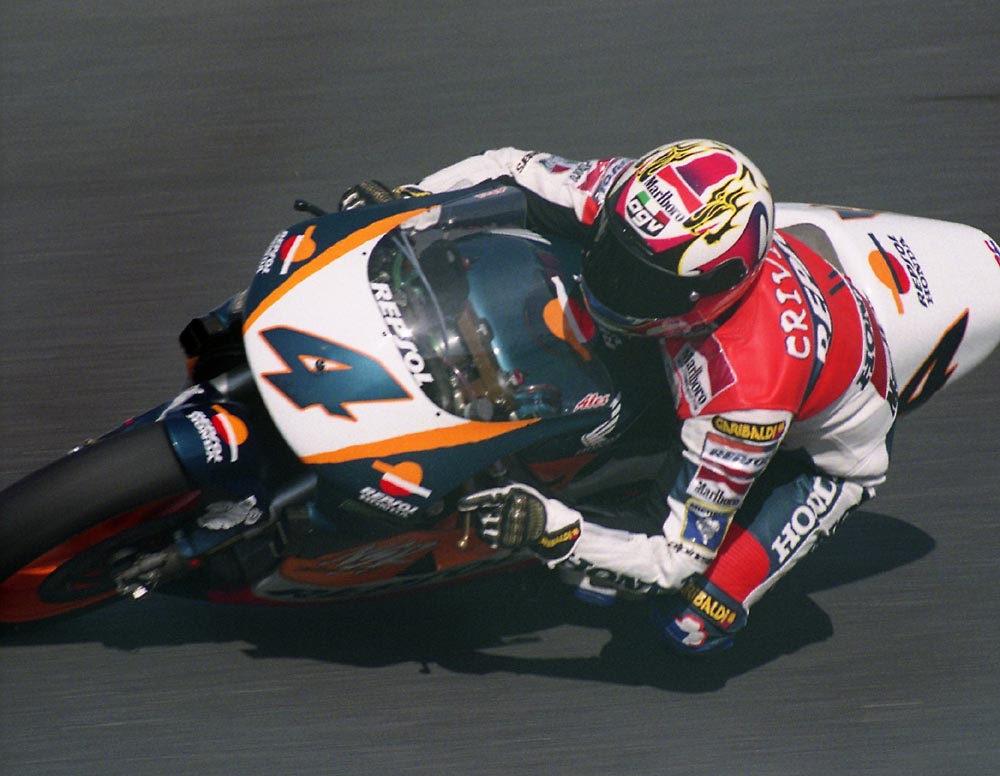
Àlex Crivillé riding his Repsol Honda NSR500 at the 1996 Japanese Grand Prix.

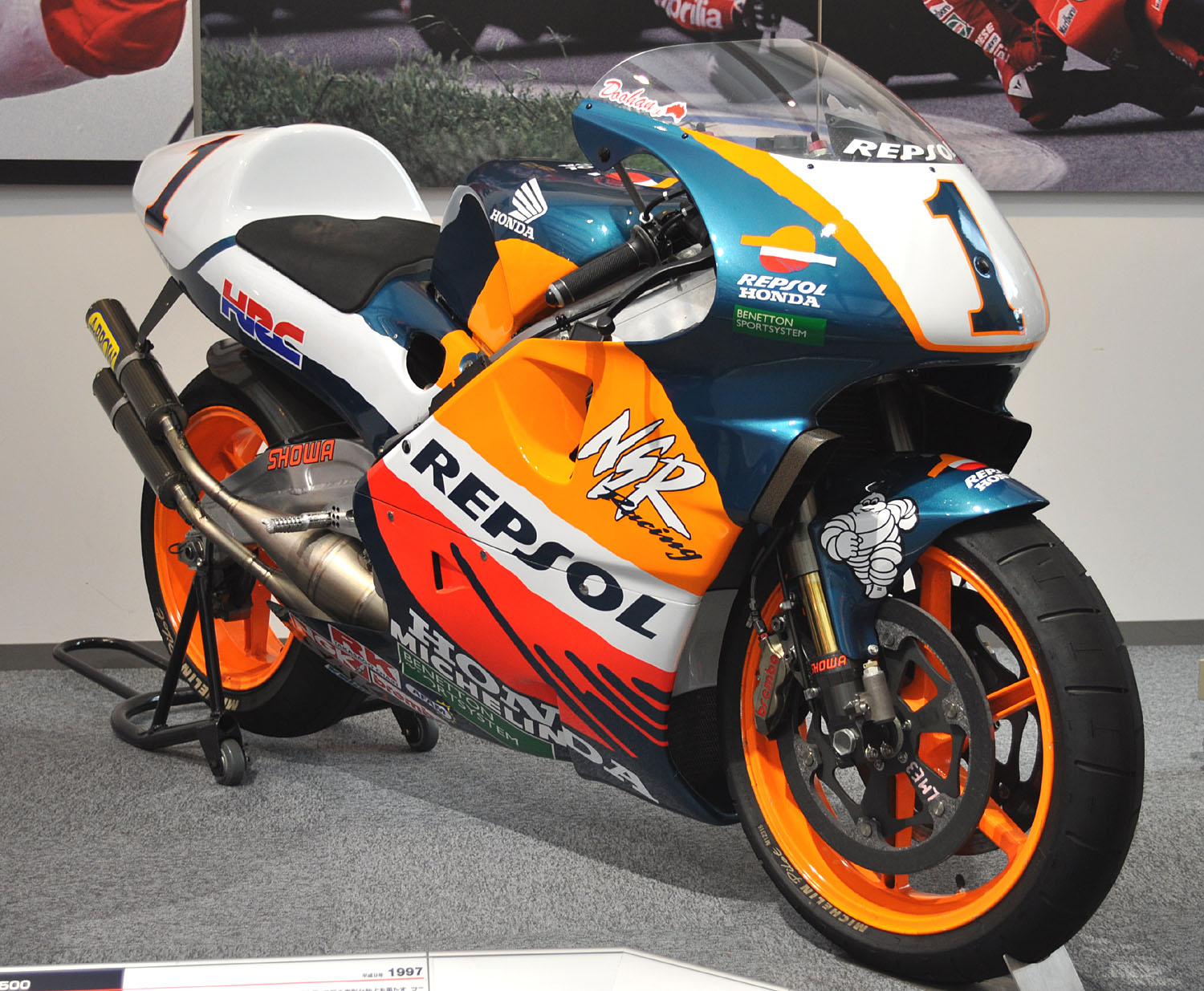
The Repsol Honda NSR500, ridden by Mick Doohan in the 1997 season on display.

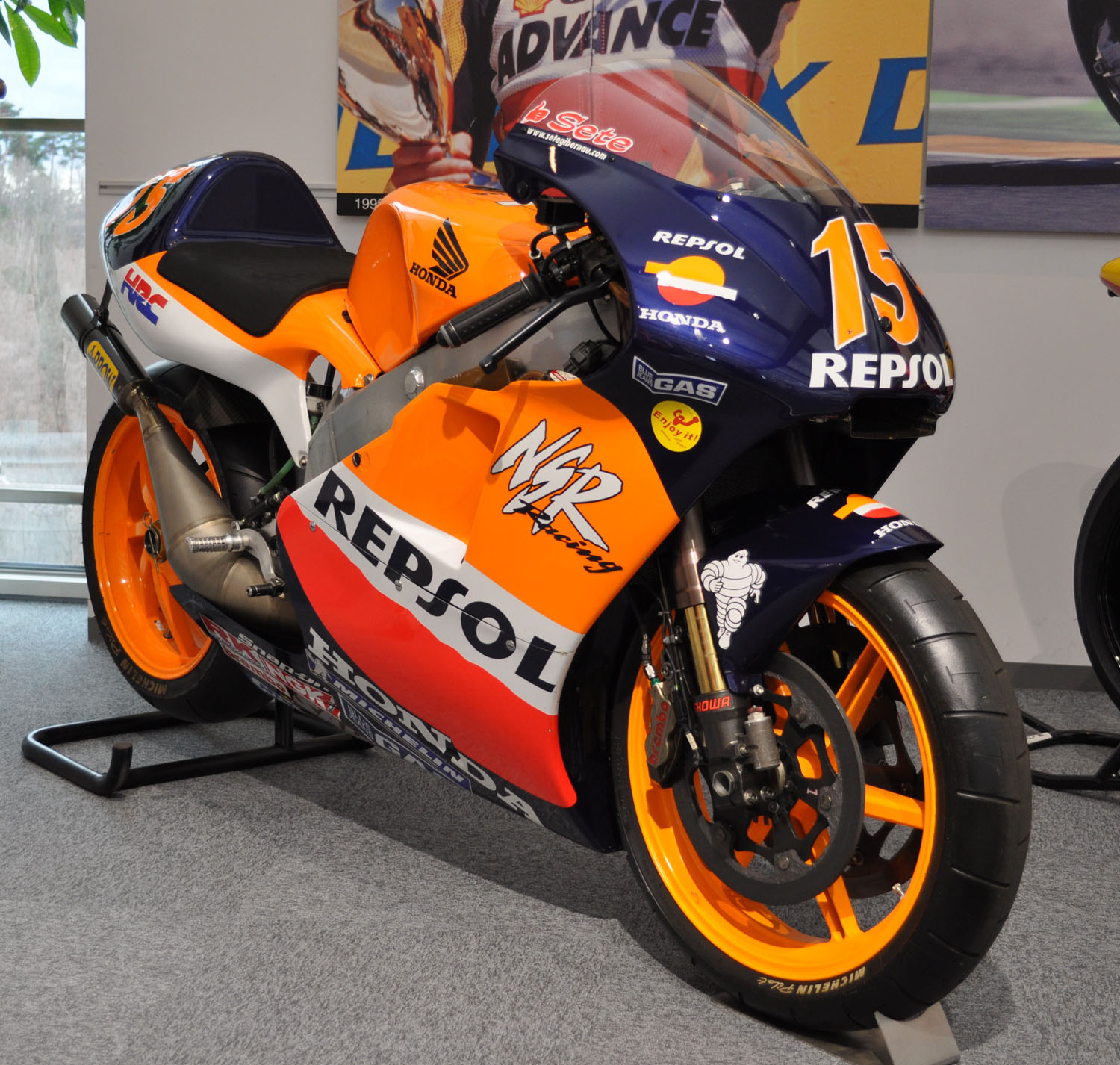
The Repsol Honda NSR500, ridden by Sete Gibernau in the 1999 season on display.

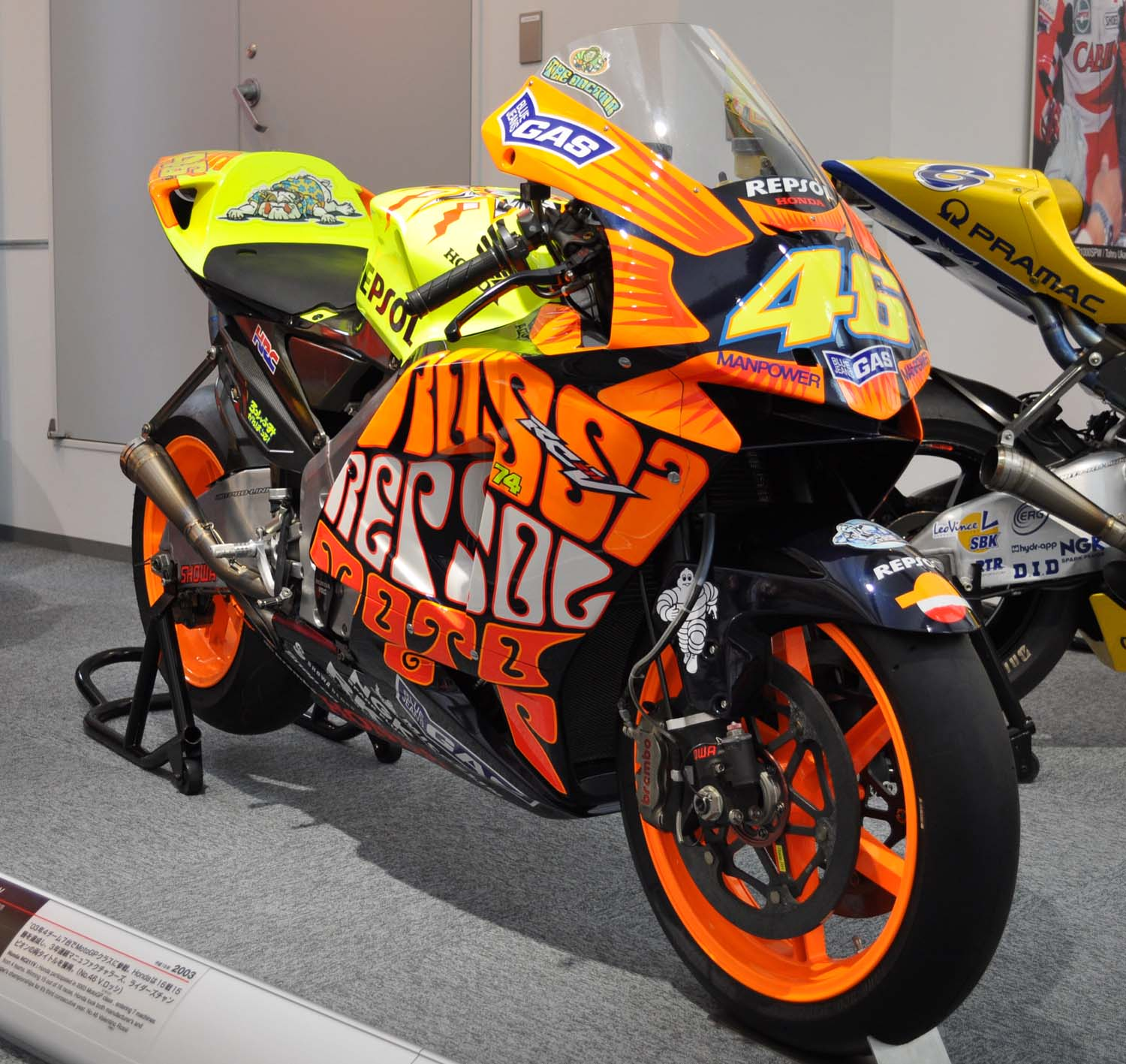
The Repsol Honda RC211V, ridden by Valentino Rossi in the 2003 season on display with a special livery.

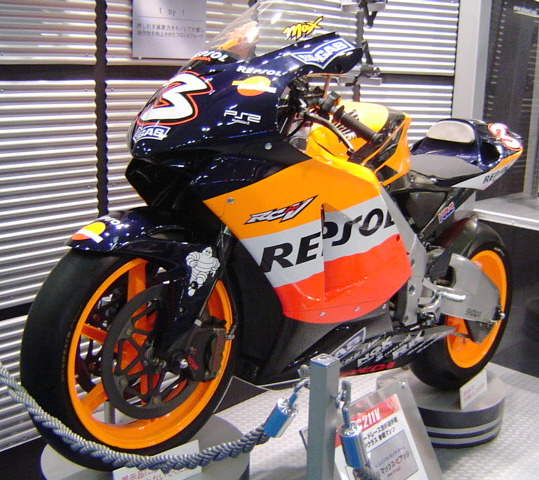
The Repsol Honda RC211V, ridden by Max Biaggi in the 2005 season on display.

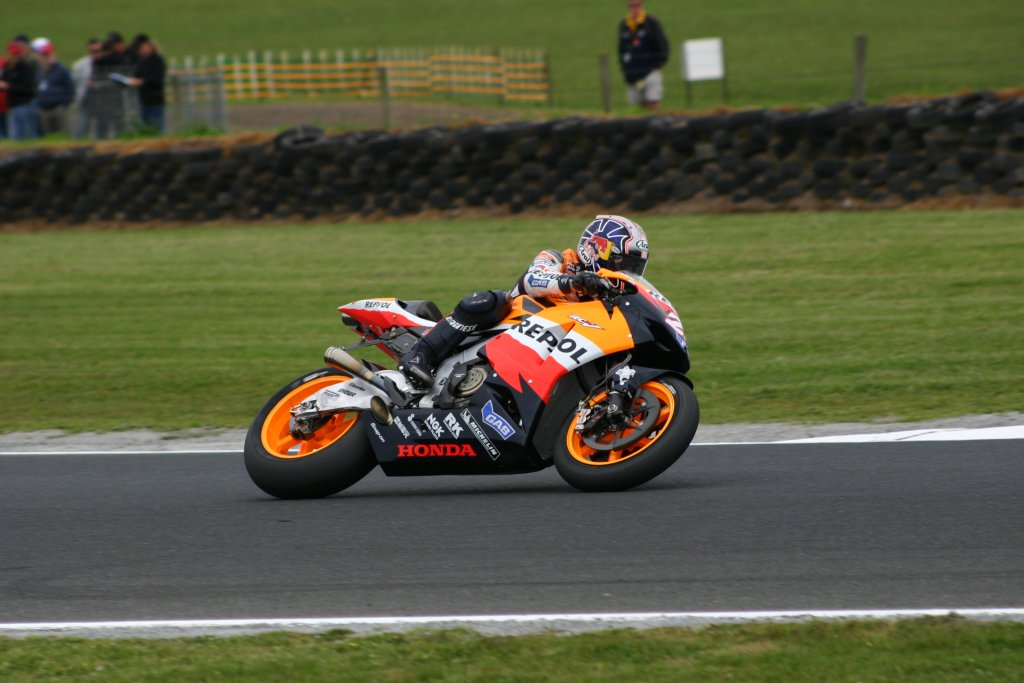
Dani Pedrosa riding his Repsol Honda RC211V at the 2006 Australian Grand Prix.

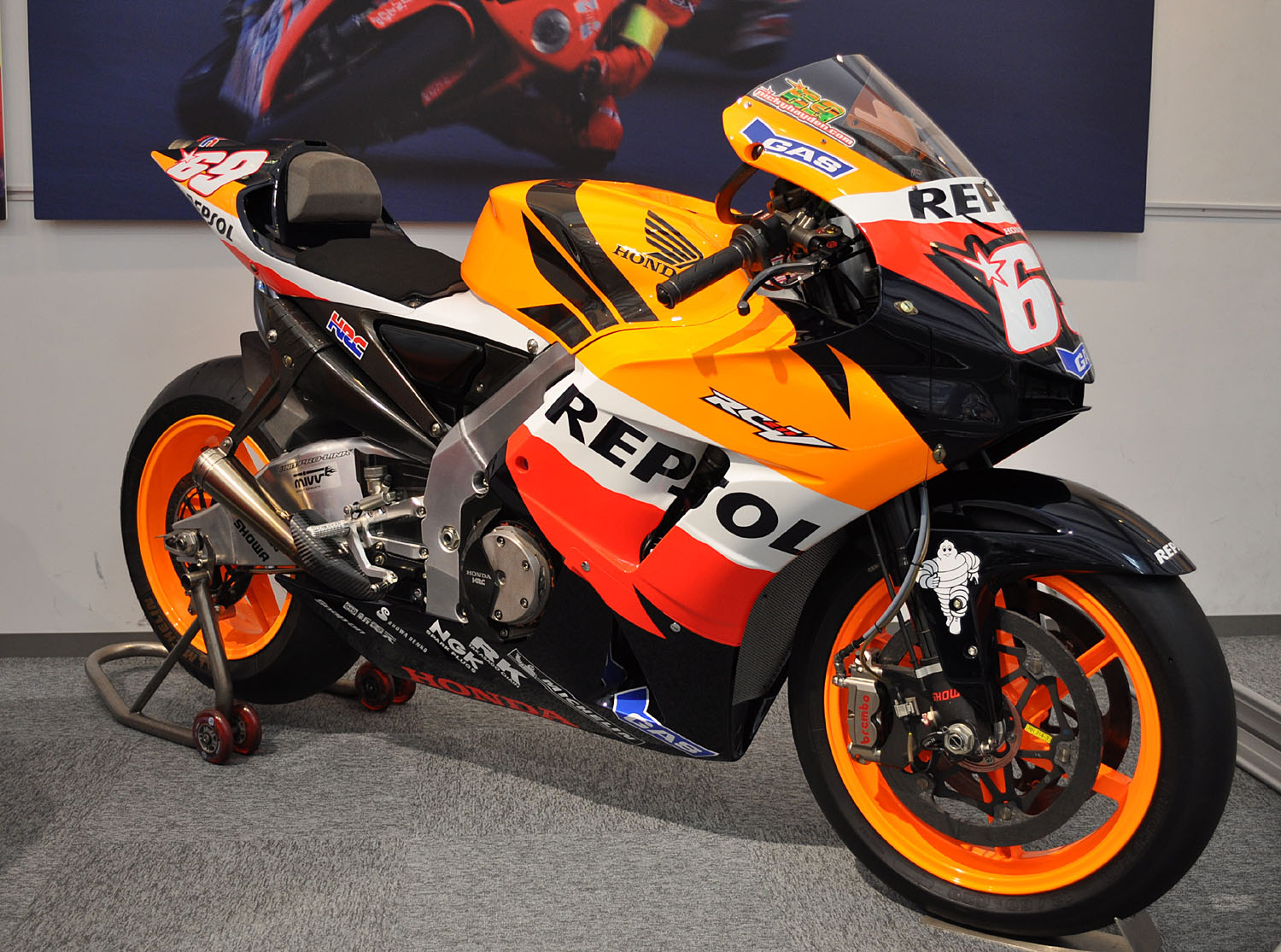
The Repsol Honda RC211V, ridden by Nicky Hayden in the 2006 season on display.

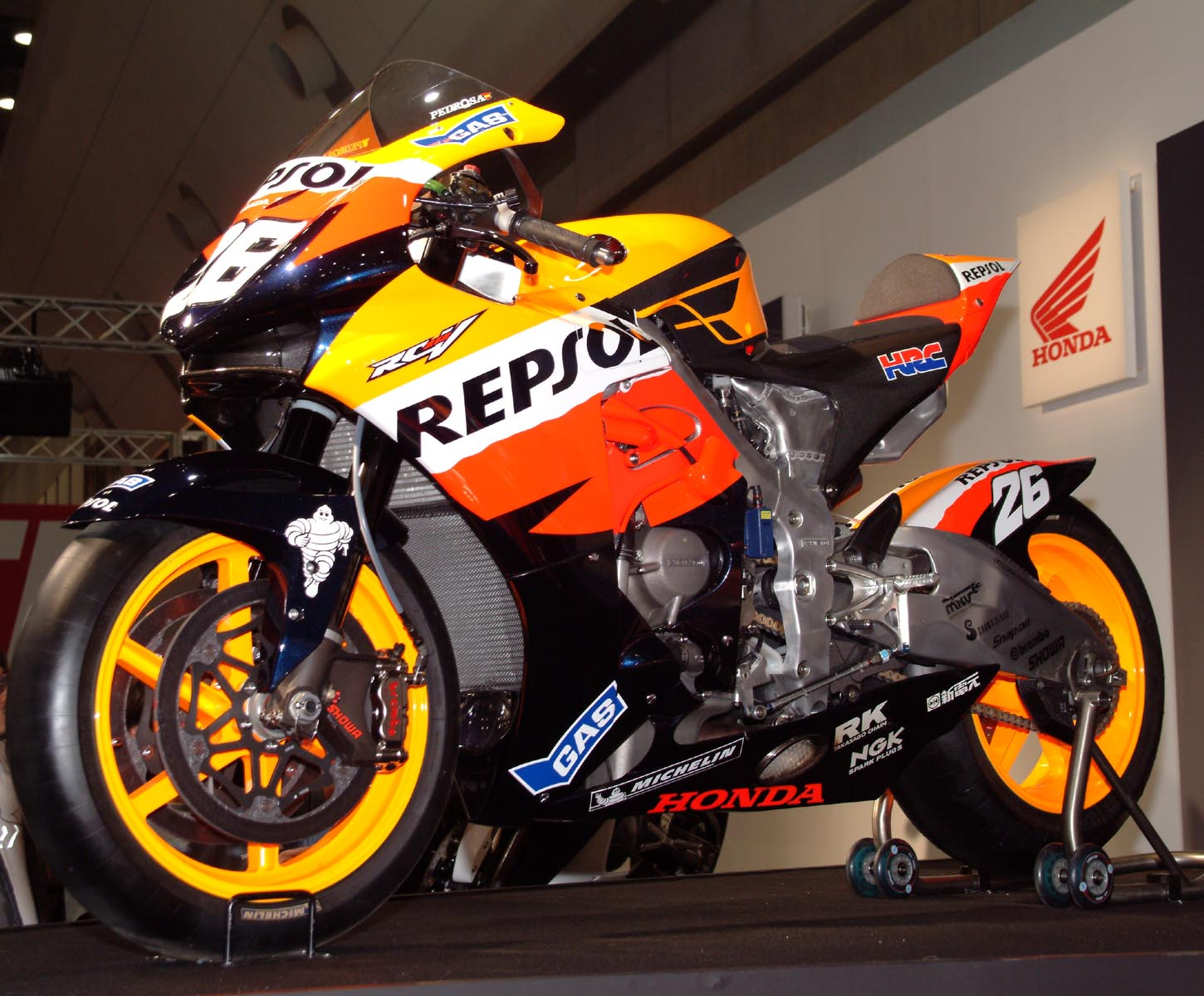
The Repsol Honda RC212V, ridden by Dani Pedrosa in the 2007 season on display.

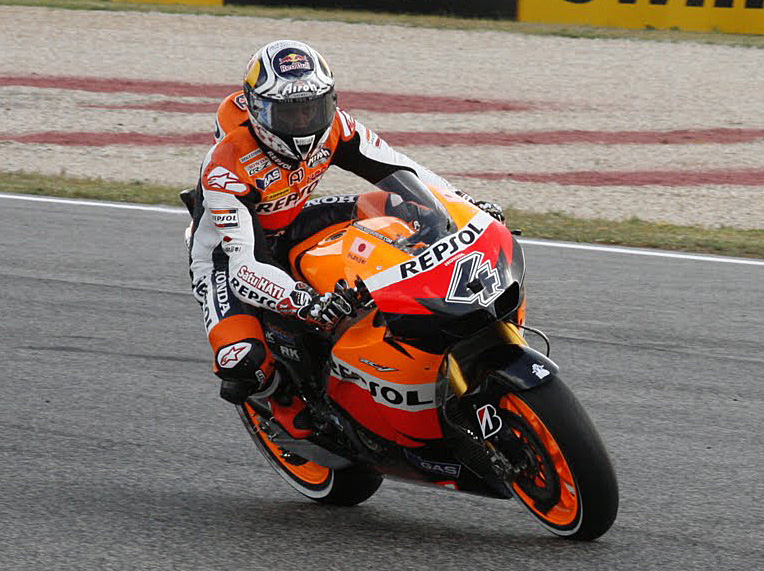
Andrea Dovizioso riding his Repsol Honda RC212V at the 2011 Portuguese Grand Prix.

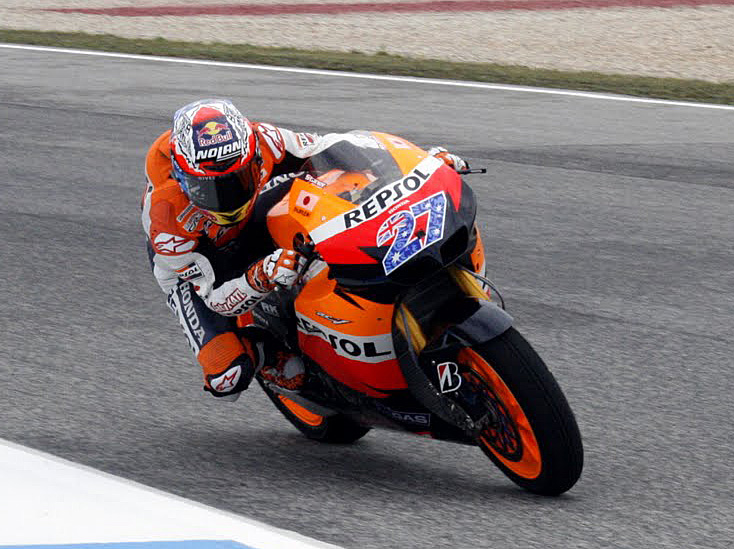
Casey Stoner riding his Repsol Honda RC212V at the 2011 Portuguese Grand Prix.

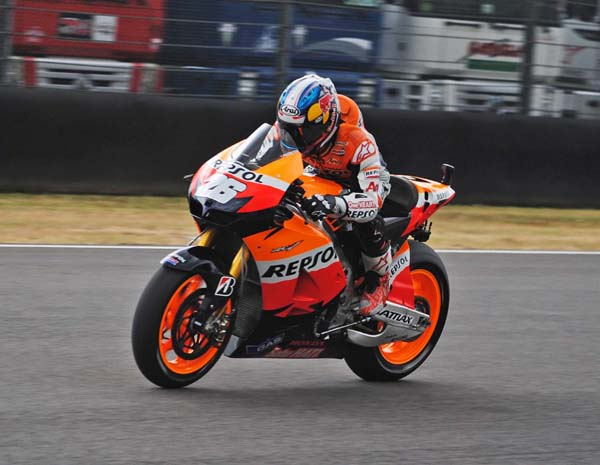
Dani Pedrosa riding his Repsol Honda RC213V at the 2012 Italian Grand Prix.

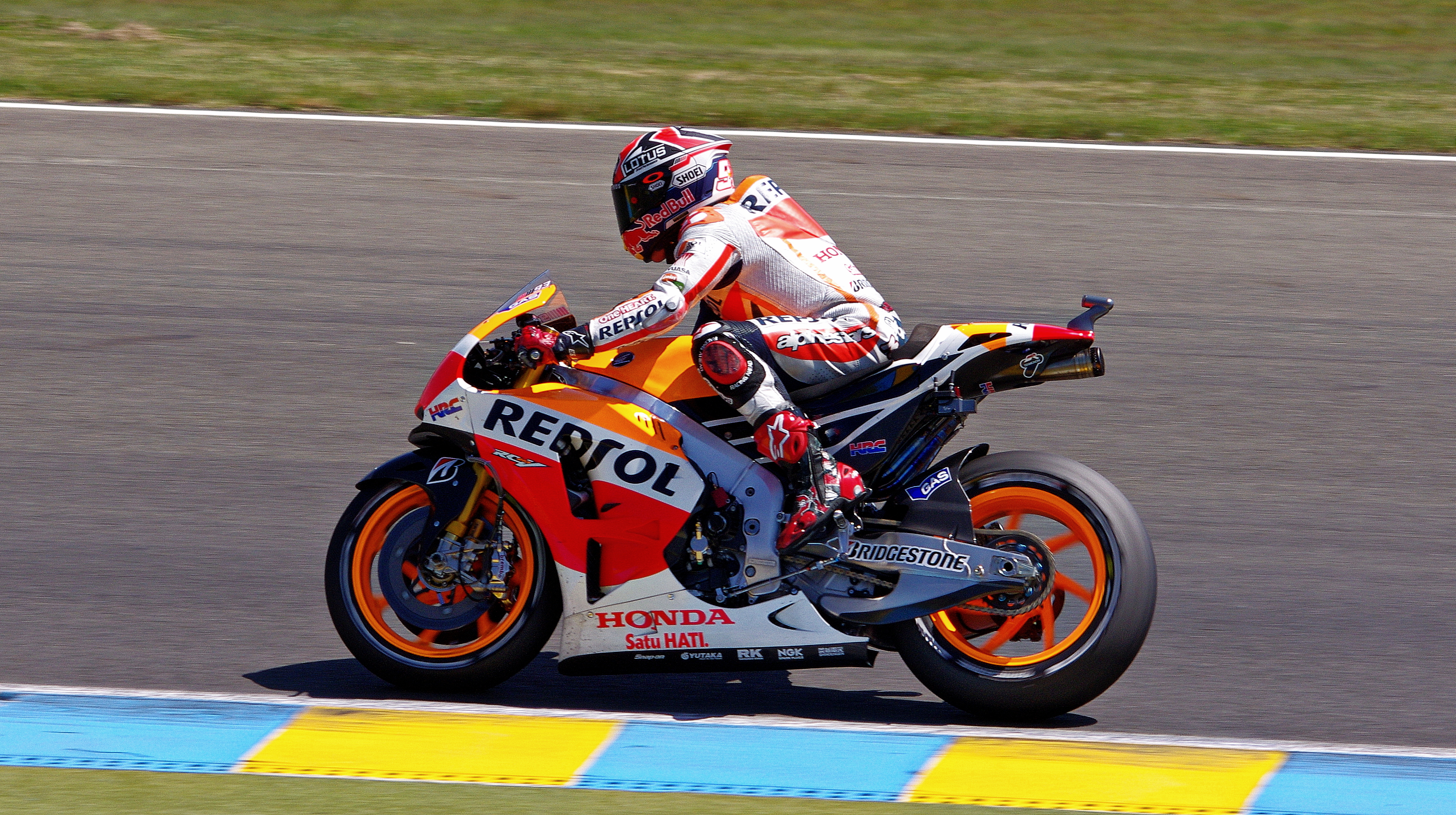
Marc Márquez riding his Repsol Honda RC213V at the 2014 French Grand Prix.

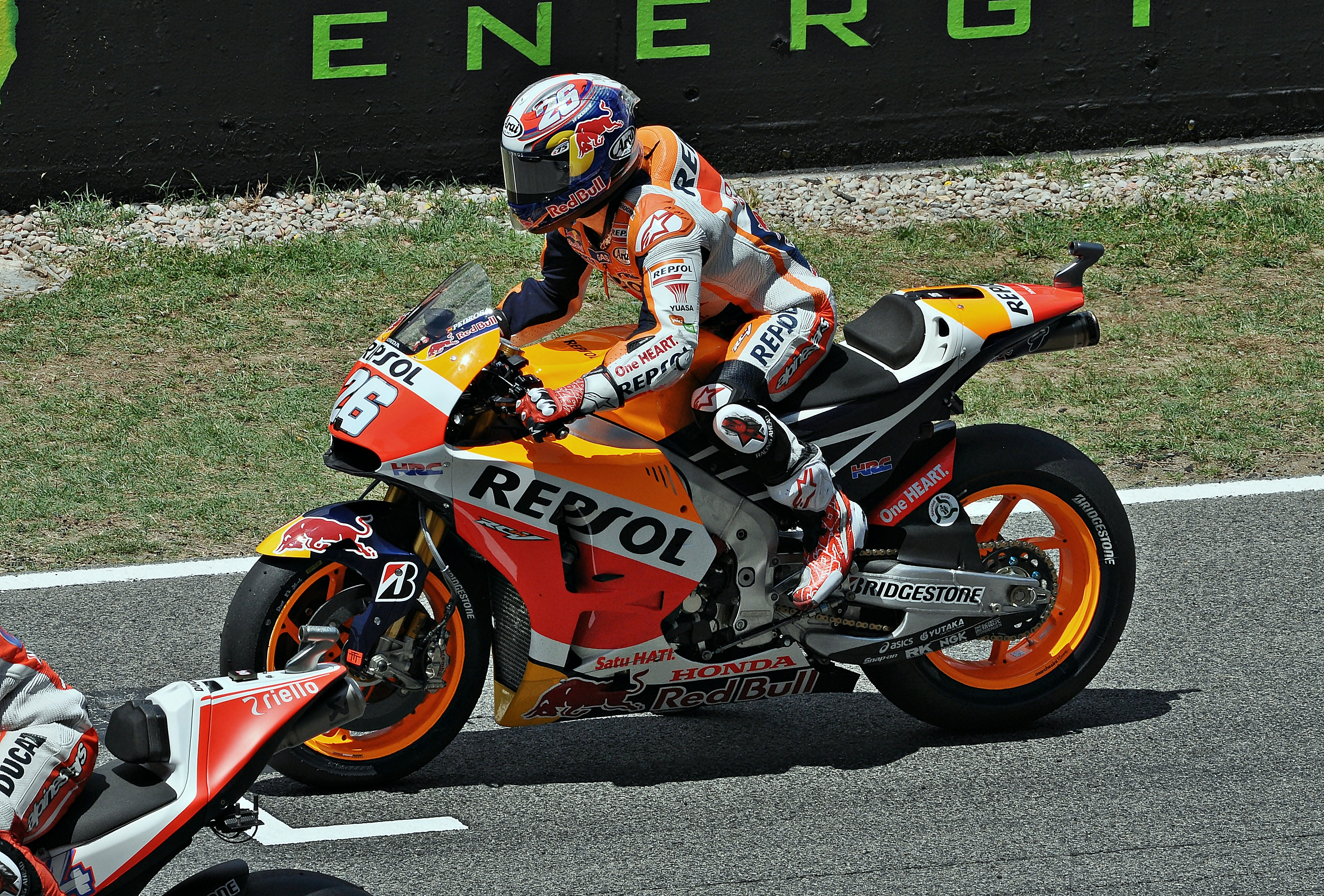
Dani Pedrosa, lining up at the starting grid with his Repsol Honda RC213V at the 2015 Spanish Grand Prix.

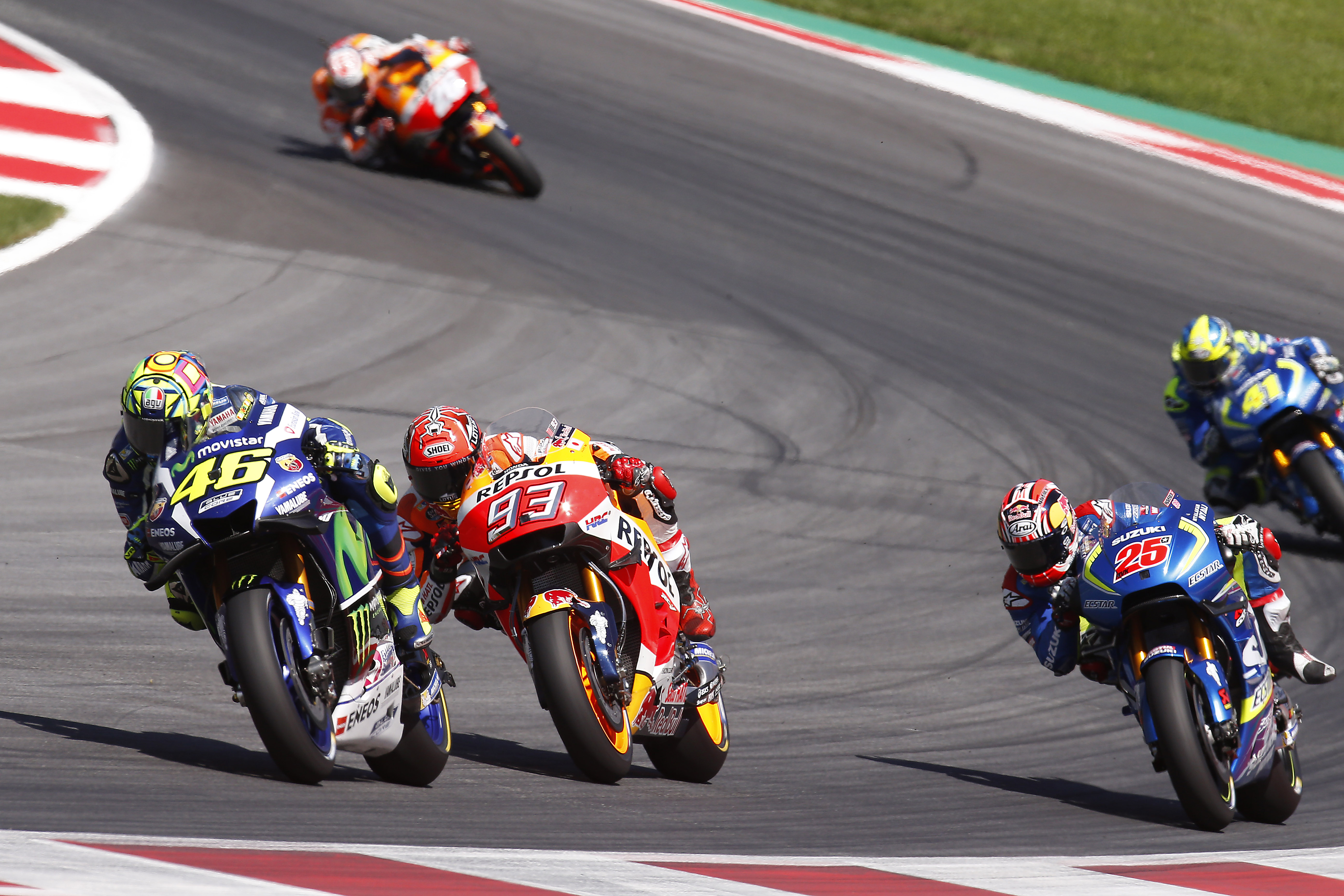
Valentino Rossi, Marc Márquez and Maverick Viñales racing at the 2016 Austrian Grand Prix.

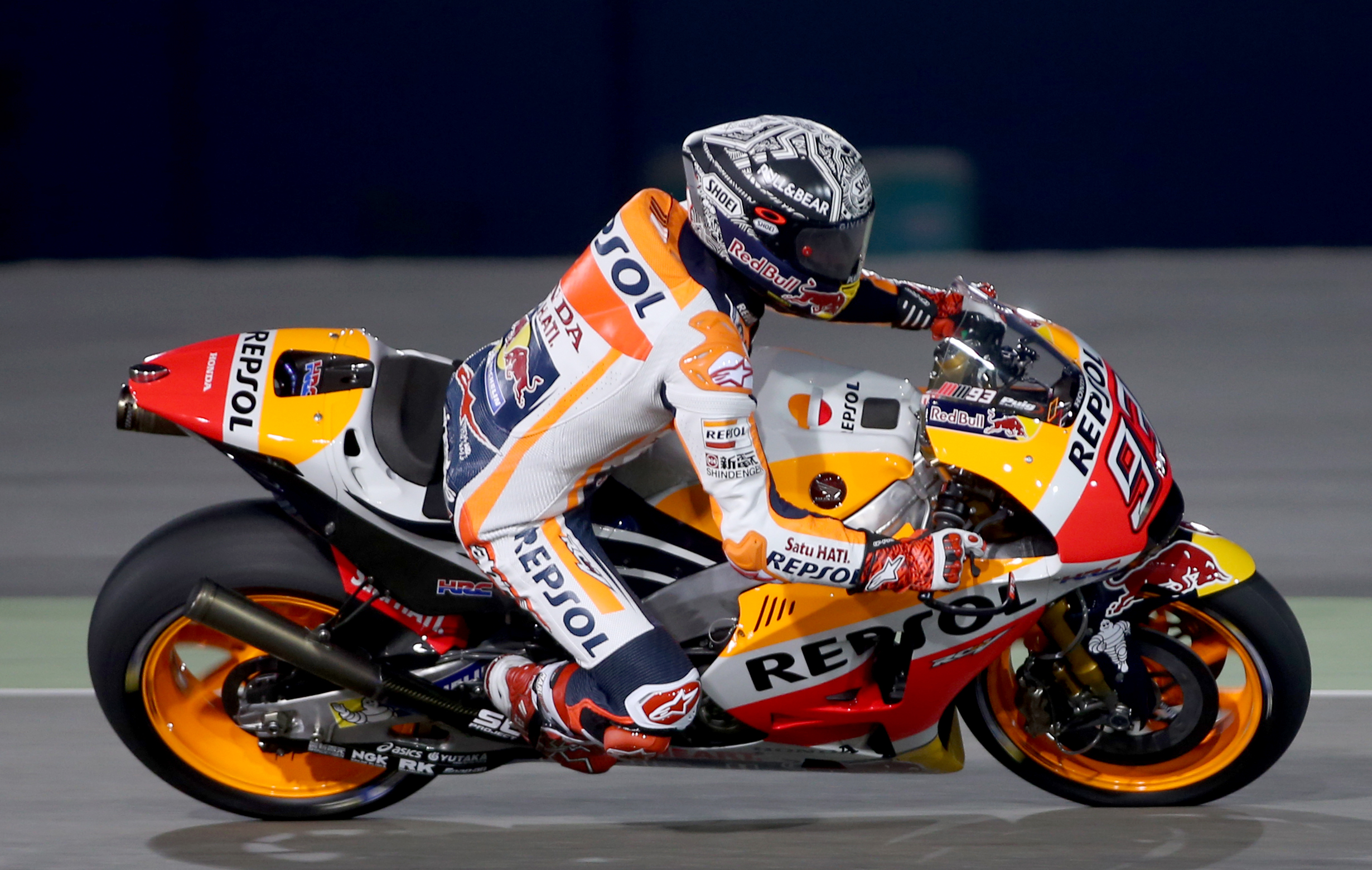
Marc Márquez riding his Repsol Honda RC213V at the 2017 Qatar Grand Prix.

=== Team Nastro Azzurro ===
In the 2000 and 2001 seasons, when Valentino Rossi joined the 500cc category, he raced under a different HRC-backed team, Team Nastro Azzurro, which featured Rossi's then sponsor, Nastro Azzurro.

Year	Main colour(s)	Additional colour(s)	Main sponsor(s)	Additional major sponsor(s)	Notes
2000	Yellow	Blue, white, black	Nastro Azzurro	SAK, Polini, NGK, Michelin, RK Takasago, Beta Tools, BioFox, Afam, PlayStation, Breil, Domino	the Nastro Azzurro logos were replaced with a white space in races where alochol advertising is not allowed
2001	Yellow	Blue, white, black	Nastro Azzurro	Repsol YPF; SAK, Polini, NGK, Michelin, RK Takasago, Beta Tools, BioFox, Afam, PlayStation, Breil, Domino	the Nastro Azzurro logos were replaced by a barcode in races where alochol advertising is not allowed
2001 (Italy GP)	White, light blue	Blue, white, black	Nastro Azzurro	Repsol YPF; SAK, Polini, NGK, Michelin, RK Takasago, Beta Tools, BioFox, Afam, Energie, Domino	

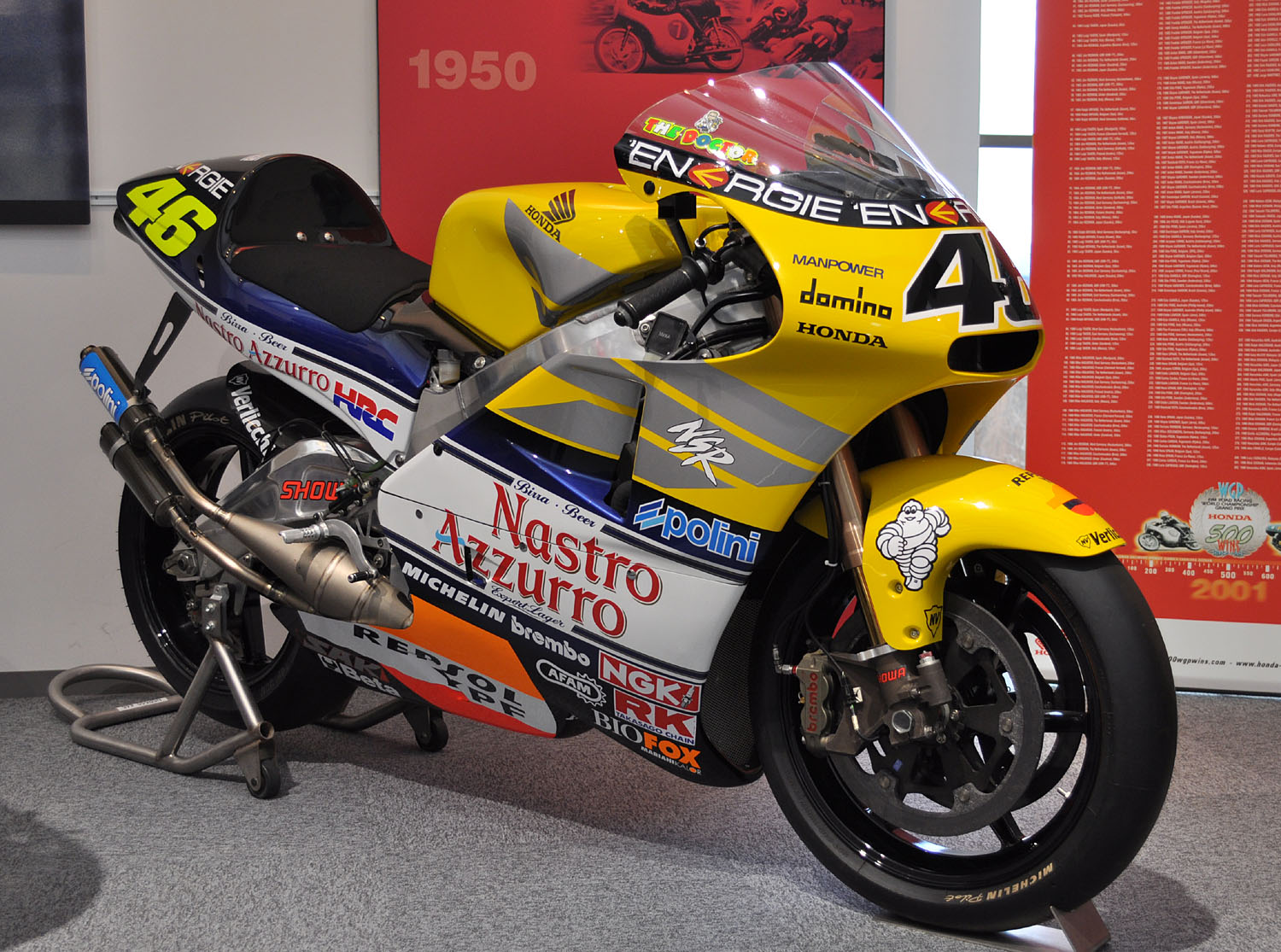
Valentino Rossi's 2001 Honda NSR500 with its Nastro Azzurro and Repsol YPF livery on display.

== Kawasaki Motors Racing ==
Kawasaki returned after an absence of 20 years at the 2002 Pacific motorcycle Grand Prix. Kawasaki Motors, with their four-stroke Ninja ZX-RR, raced as wildcards in the last four races of the season as a preparation before entering the championship full-time in the following season.

In 2004, Shinya Nakano joined the team and managed to get the ZX-RR's first podium with a third place at the Japanese Grand Prix. In 2005, Olivier Jacque scored a second place at the Chinese Grand Prix. The next year Nakano finished second at the Dutch TT. In 2007, Randy de Puniet scored a second place at the Japanese Grand Prix. In 2008 John Hopkins and Anthony West rode the machine.

The ZX-RR struggled in 2008, with the best results being two fifth-place finishes from John Hopkins in Portugal and Anthony West in Brno. Hopkins and West blamed both a lack of feeling in the front end and rear traction on corner exit. Previous ZX-RRs have been difficult to ride, but beyond the limited statements by the riders it is unclear what the problems with the 2008 bike were.

In August 2008, Kawasaki signed Marco Melandri to join John Hopkins for the 2009 season. However, the 2008 financial crisis led Kawasaki to reconsider its MotoGP program, and the Italian sports daily Tuttosport reported on December 30 that Kawasaki would be pulling out of MotoGP for 2009.

On January 9, 2009, Kawasaki announced it had decided to "... suspend its MotoGP racing activities from 2009 season onward and reallocate management resources more efficiently". The company stated that it will continue racing activities using mass-produced motorcycles as well as supporting general race oriented consumers.

=== MotoGP ===
Year	Main colour(s)	Additional colour(s)	Main sponsor(s)	Additional major sponsor(s)	Notes
2002	Light green	Black	None	Dunlop, MAN, Fuchs Petrolub, NGK, RK Takasago Chain, Öhlins, KAZE, Akrapovič	Entered as a wildcard rider in the 2002 Pacific Grand Prix
2003	Light green	Black	None	Dunlop, MAN, Fuchs Petrolub, NGK, RK Takasago Chain, 2D, Brembo, Öhlins, KAZE, Akrapovič	
2004	Light green	Black	None	Bridgestone, MAN, Fuchs Petrolub, NGK, RK Takasago Chain, 2D, Brembo, Öhlins, KAZE, Akrapovič	
2005	Light green	Black, white	None	Bridgestone, Magneti Marelli, MAN, Fuchs Petrolub, NGK, 2D, RK Takasago Chain, G-Shock, Akrapovič, AFAM	
2006	Light green	Black, white, grey	None	Bridgestone, Elf, Magneti Marelli, MAN, Fuchs Petrolub, NGK, 2D, RK Takasago Chain, G-Shock, Akrapovič, AFAM	
2007	Light green	Black	None	Bridgestone, Elf, NGK, Magneti Marelli, Nichirin, NGK, 2D, RK Takasago Chain, G-Shock, Akrapovič, AFAM	
2008	Light green	Black	None	Bridgestone, Monster Energy, Elf, NGK, Beta, Axio, Nichirin, NGK, 2D, RK Takasago Chain, G-Shock, Akrapovič, AFAM	

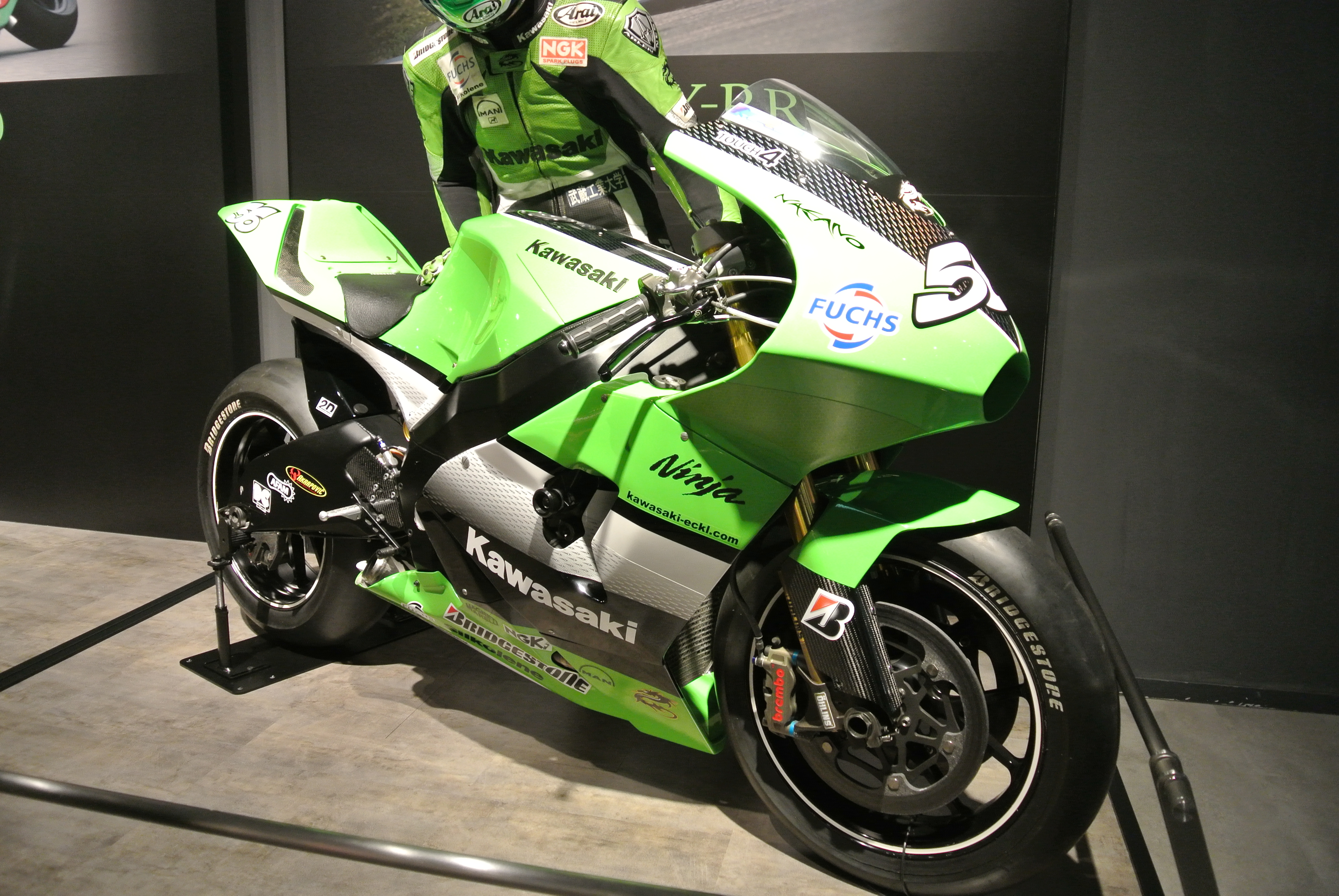
The Kawasaki Ninja ZX-RR, ridden by Shinya Nakano, Olivier Jacque and Alex Hofmann in the 2005 season on display.

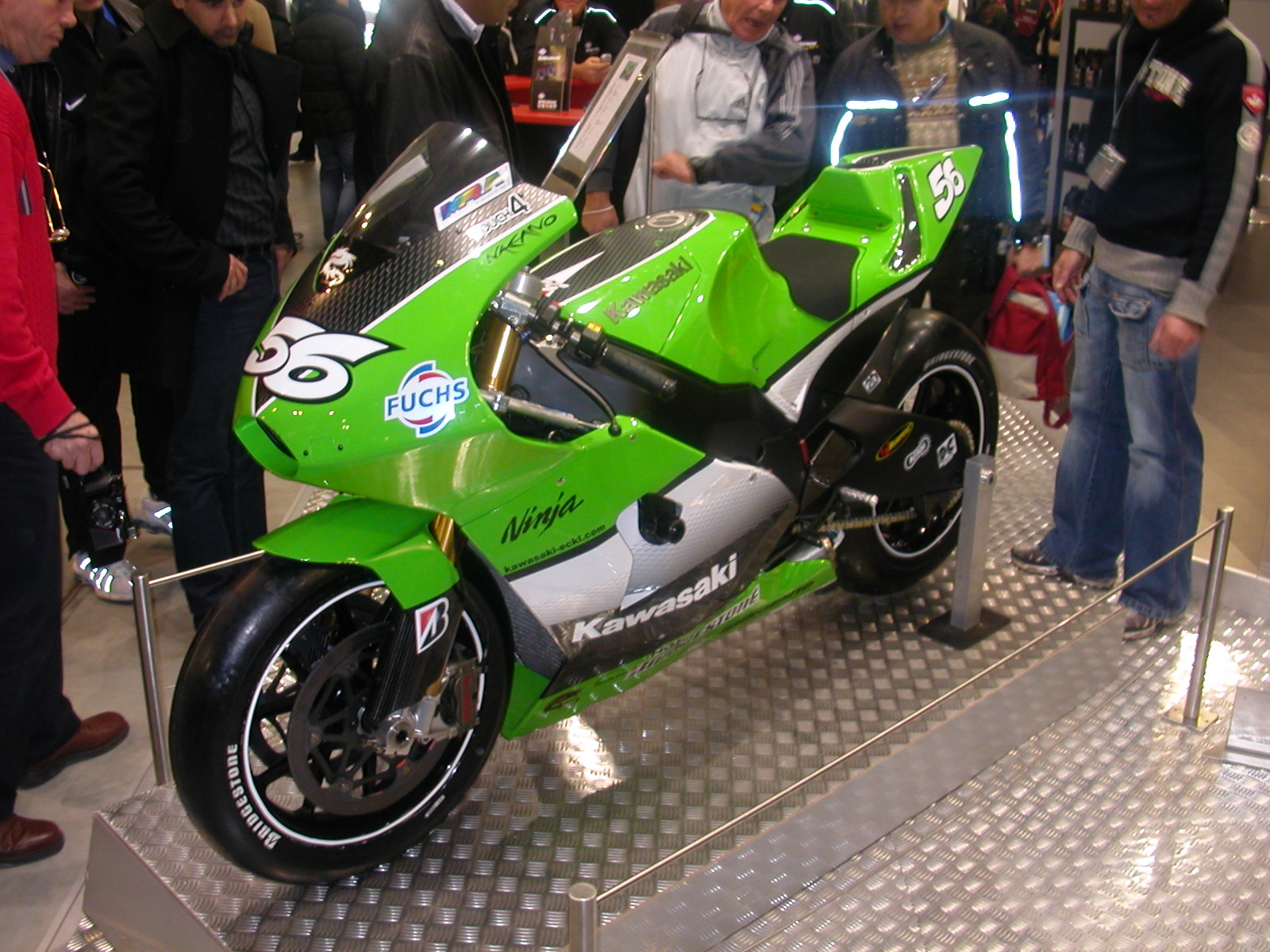
A frontal view of the 2005 Kawasaki Ninja ZX-RR.

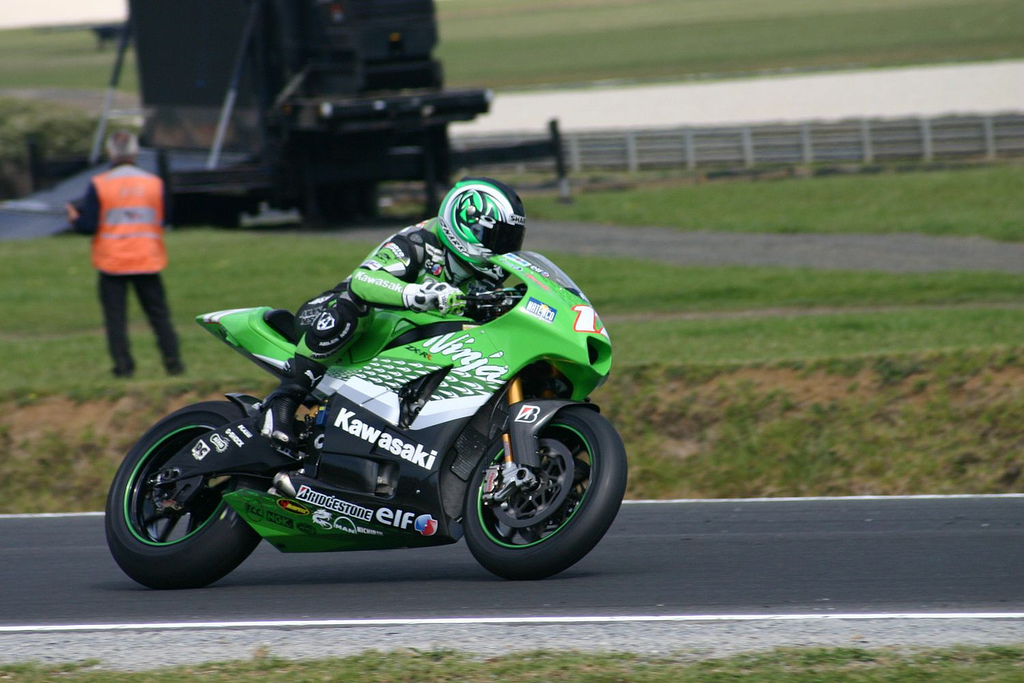
Randy de Puniet, riding his 2006 Kawasaki Ninja ZX-RR.

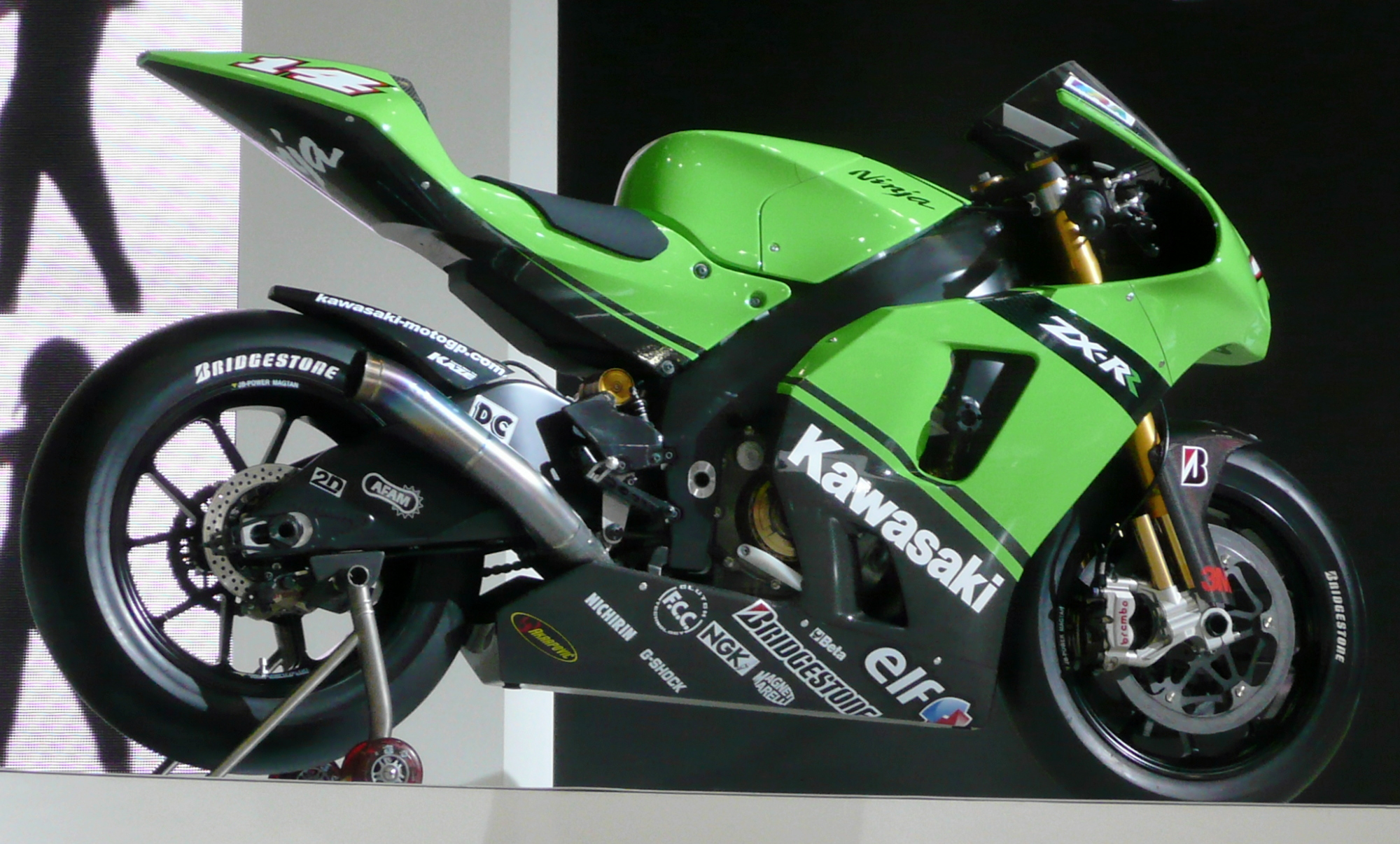
The Kawasaki Ninja ZX-RR, ridden by Randy de Puniet, Anthony West, Olivier Jacque, Fonsi Nieto (1 race) and Akira Yanagawa (1 race) in the 2007 season on display.

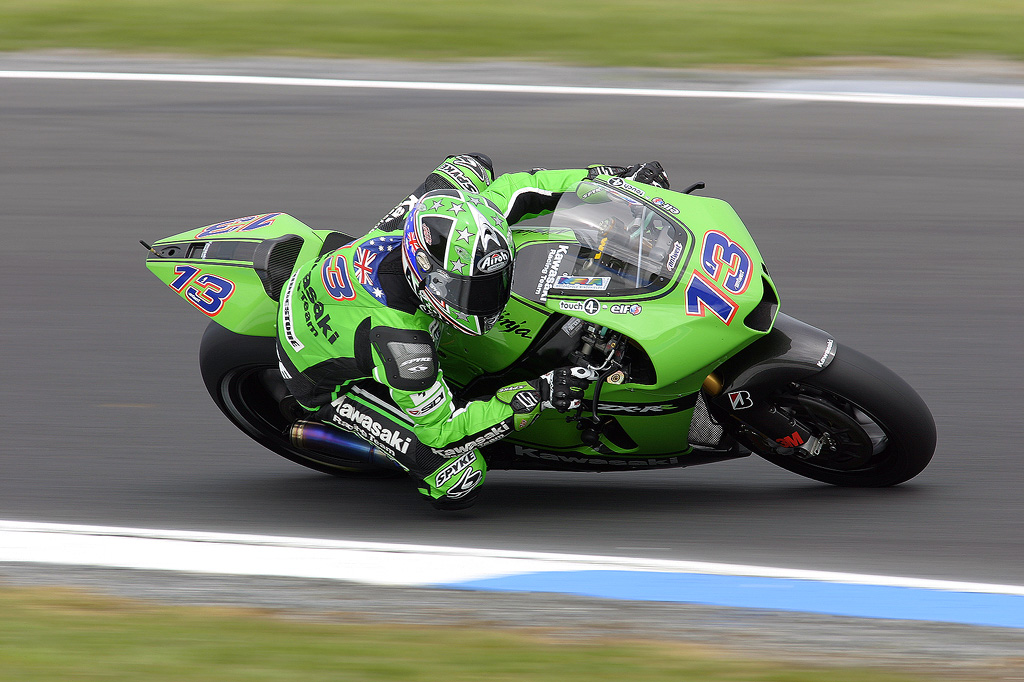
Anthony West, riding his Kawasaki Ninja ZX-RR at the 2007 Australian Grand Prix.

== KTM ==
KTM AG (the former KTM Sportmotorcycle AG) is an Austrian motorcycle and sports car manufacturer owned by KTM Industries AG and Indian manufacturer Bajaj Auto. It was formed in 1992 but traces its foundation to as early as 1934. Today, KTM AG is the parent company of the KTM Group.

In 2003, KTM started sponsoring and supporting Road racing in various capacities, with the most successful results stemming from their Supermoto efforts. From 2003 to 2009, a KTM factory team competed in the 125cc class of the motorcycle Grand Prix, and between 2005 and 2008 in the 250cc class. Notable successes in the 125 cc class were the second and third place in the overall ranking scored in 2005 by KTM riders Mika Kallio and Gábor Talmácsi, the second place in 2006 by Mika Kallio, the third place in 2007 by Tomoyoshi Koyama and the 2005 KTM victory in the 125 cc constructor championship. In the 250 cc class, Mika Kallio won third place in 2008. Since the first Rookies Cup season in 2007, KTM has supplied the bike for the Red Bull MotoGP Rookies Cup. In 2009, KTM announced their withdrawal from Grand Prix motorcycle racing in all classes, and did not return until 2012 in the new Moto3 class.

In 2012, KTM won the Moto3 manufacturers' championship. During the next season, KTM riders prevailed in every race of the Moto3 class and won the world title as well as second and third place, making KTM the obvious victor of the manufacturers' standing. KTM won the manufacturer title in the 2014 and 2016 as well as the world title in 2016 in the Moto3 class. Starting in 2017, KTM fields bikes in both MotoGP and Moto2 classes as well. The main class team features Bradley Smith and Pol Espargaró as full-season riders, and Mika Kallio as wildcard rider. The Moto2 KTM Ajo team features Miguel Oliveira and Brad Binder.

=== MotoGP ===
Year	Main colour(s)	Additional colour(s)	Main sponsor(s)	Additional major sponsor(s)	Notes
2016	Dark blue, orange	Red, yellow, green	Red Bull	Michelin, Motorex, Beta Tools, WP, Pankl Racing Tools, Brembo	Raced in the 2016 Valencia Grand Prix as preparation for the 2017 season with wildcard rider Mika Kallio.
2017	Orange, dark blue	Red, yellow, green	Red Bull	Michelin, Motorex, WP, Elf, Pankl Racing Tools, Akrapovič, Brembo	
2018	Orange, dark blue	Red, yellow, green	Red Bull	Michelin, Motorex, WP, Akrapovič, Brembo	
2021	Black, Orange	Red, Green, Yellow	Red Bull	Michelin, Motorex, WP, Akrapovič, Pankl Racing Systems	
2022	Black, Orange	Red, Green, Yellow	Red Bull	Michelin, Motorex, WP, Akrapovič, Pankl Racing Systems, GILLES	
2023-2025	Black, Orange	Red, White, Yellow	Red Bull	Michelin, Mobil 1, WP, RCB, Akrapovič, Cupra (2023), Pankl Racing Systems, GILLES,	

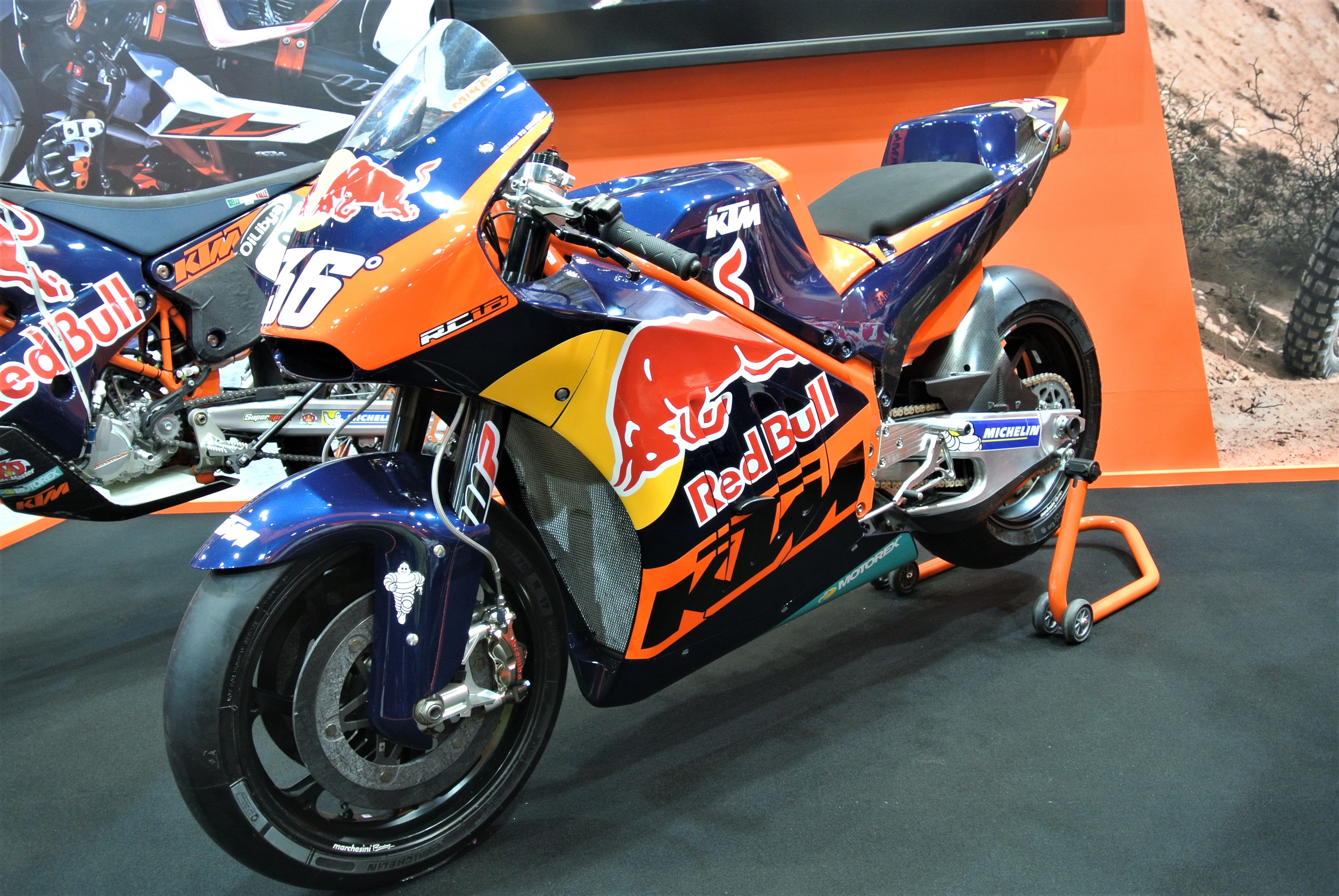
The Red Bull KTM RC16, ridden by Mika Kallio in the 2016 Valencia Grand Prix.

== Marc VDS Racing Team ==
Marc VDS Racing Team is a Belgian motorcycle racing team founded by Marc van der Straten, although it is composed of several smaller teams all operating under the Marc VDS banner. The team currently competes in two disciplines of motorsport: motorcycle racing in the MotoGP World Championship and the Moto2 World Championship, and rallying in various rally raid events. It has also formerly competed in many auto racing championships, such as the Blancpain Endurance Series and the European Le Mans Series.

=== MotoGP ===
Year	Main colour(s)	Additional colour(s)	Main sponsor(s)	Additional major sponsor(s)	Notes
2015	Blue, black	White	Estrella Galicia 0.0%	Bridgestone, ELF, Beta Tools, RK Takasago Chain, NGK, Brembo	
2016	Blue, black	White	Estrella Galicia 0.0%	Michelin, ELF, SC Helmet, Beta Tools, RK Takasago Chain, NGK, Brembo	
2017	Blue, black	White	Estrella Galicia 0.0%	Michelin, ELF, SC Helmet, Beta Tools, RK Takasago Chain, NGK, Brembo	
2018	Blue, black	White	Estrella Galicia 0.0%	Michelin, ELF, Herz, SC Helmet, Beta Tools, RK Takasago Chain, NGK, Brembo	

== MV Agusta ==
=== MotoGP ===
Year	Main colour(s)	Additional colour(s)	Main sponsor(s)	Additional major sponsor(s)	Notes
1950-1976	Red, silver	None			

== Pons Racing ==
=== MotoGP/500cc ===
Year	Main colour(s)	Additional colour(s)	Main sponsor(s)	Additional major sponsor(s)	Notes
1991	White	Blue, Red, Orange	Campsa	Honda, Michelin, Banesto	
1992	White	Blue, Red, Orange	Campsa	Honda, Michelin	
1993	Red	Gold, White, Blue, Orange	Ducados	Honda, Repsol, Dunlop	
1994	White	Blue, Gold, Orange	Ducados	Honda, Repsol, Fanta, Michelin	
1995	Red	White, Gold, Blue, Orange	Fortuna	Honda, Repsol, Michelin, Santiveri	Fortuna logos had the "ortun" removed, forming the "F a" in races where tobacco advertisement is not allowed.
1996	Red	White, Gold, Orange	Fortuna	Honda, Repsol, Michelin	Fortuna logos had the "ortun" removed, forming the "F a" in races where tobacco advertisement is not allowed.
1997	Blue	White, Gold, Orange, Red	Movistar	Honda, Repsol, Motorola, Michelin	
1998	Blue	White, Orange Red	Movistar	Honda, Repsol, Michelin, Activa Joven	
1999	Blue	White, Orange Red	Movistar	Honda, Repsol, Michelin, Circuit de Valencia	
2000	White	Black, Red	Emerson Electronics	Honda, Elf Aquitaine, Gas Jeans, Axo, PlayStation, Correos, Michelin	
2001	Black	White, Red	West	Honda, Elf Aquitaine, Sidi, Michelin, Mokador (on Capirossi's bike), ABN AMRO Banco Real (on Barros' bike)	West logos were replaced with Alex (for Barros' bike) and Loris (for Capirossi's bike) in races where tobacco advertisement is not allowed.
2002	Black	White, Red	West	Honda, Mobil 1, Correos, Michelin	West logos were replaced with Alex (for Barros' bike) and Loris (for Capirossi's bike) in races where tobacco advertisement is not allowed.
2003	Yellow	Blue, White	Camel	Honda, Mobil 1, Correos, Michelin	Camel logos were replaced with rider's name and a motorcycle rider's silhouette in races where tobacco advertisement is not allowed.
2004	Yellow	Blue	Camel	Honda, Mobil 1, Correos, Bridgestone, Pramac	Camel logos were replaced with rider's name and a motorcycle rider's silhouette in races where tobacco advertisement is not allowed.
2005	Yellow	Blue	Camel	Honda, Mobil 1, Michelin	Camel logos were replaced with rider's name and a motorcycle rider's silhouette in races where tobacco advertisement is not allowed.

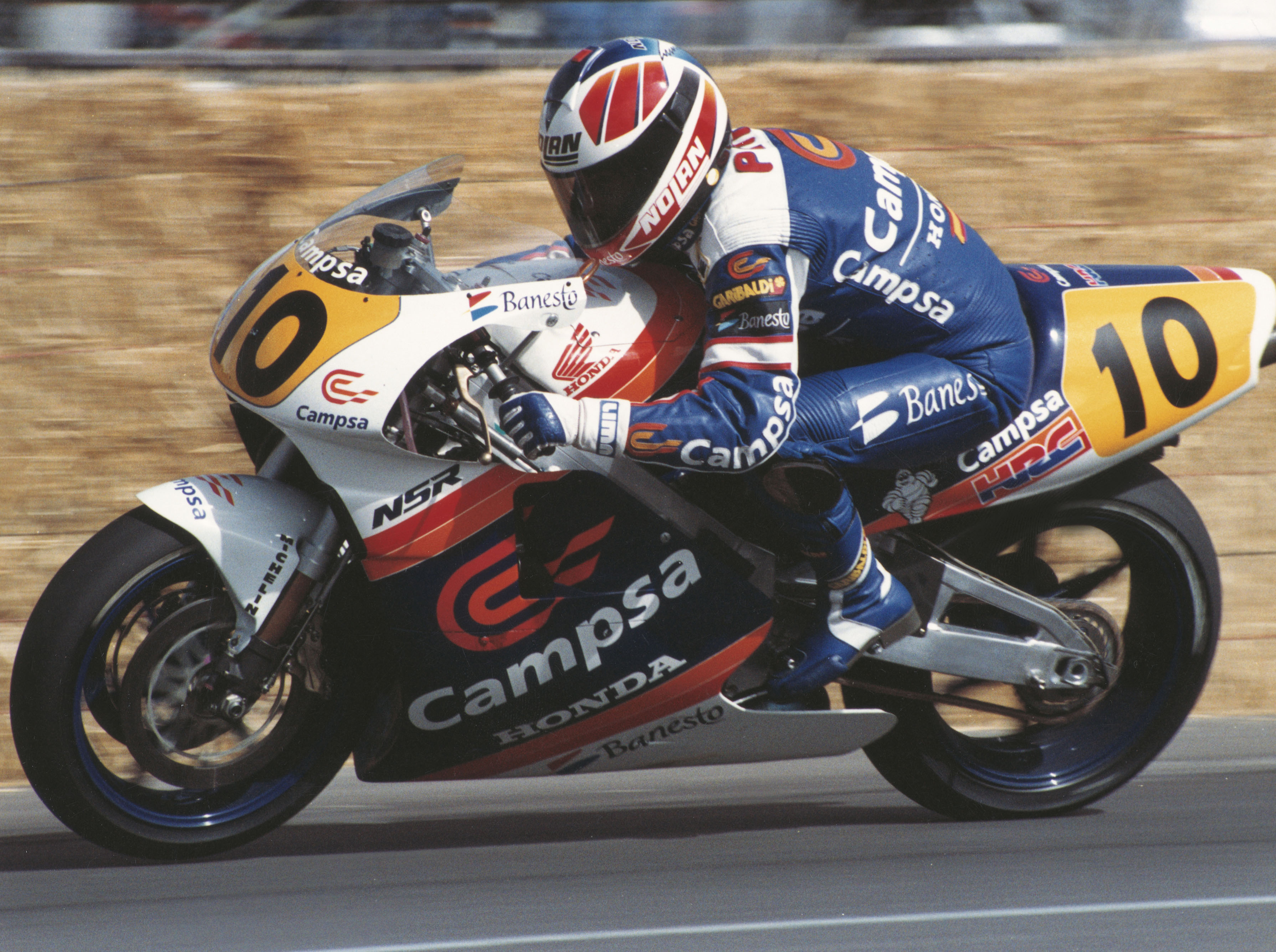
Sito Pons riding his Honda NSR500 at the 1991 United States Grand Prix.

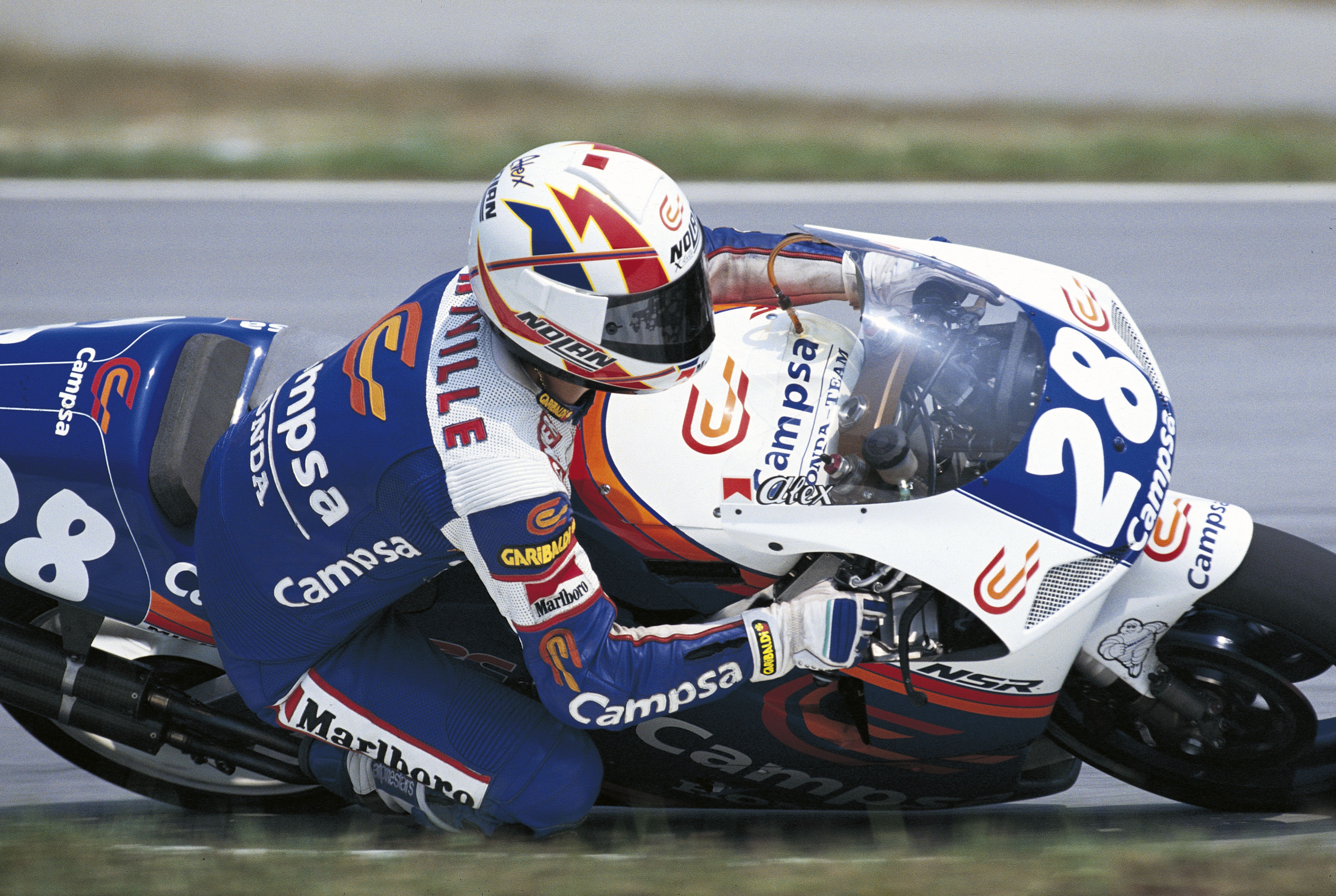
Alex Crivillé riding his Honda NSR500 at the 1992 Malaysian Grand Prix

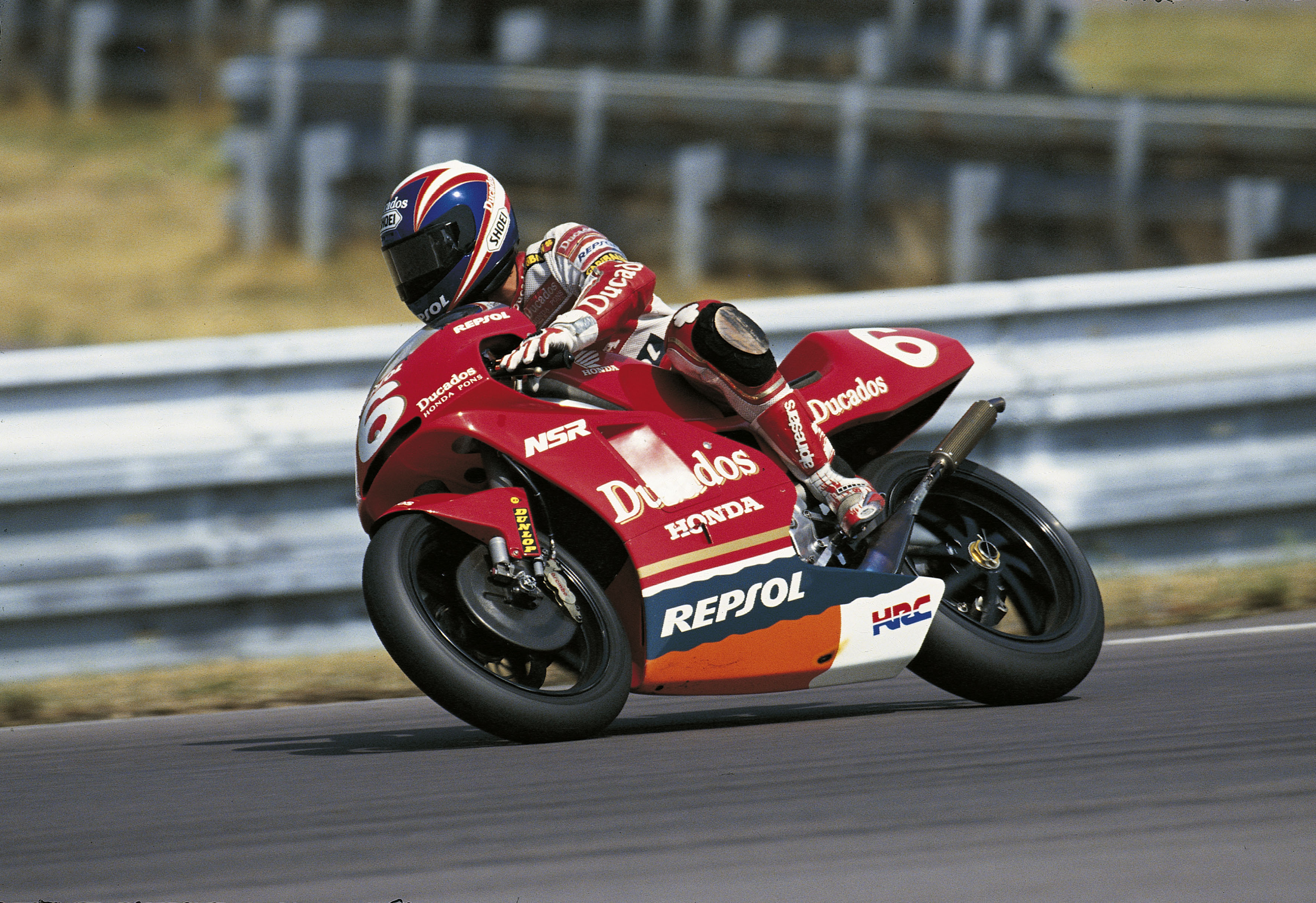
Alberto Puig riding his Honda NSR500 at the 1993 Czech Grand Prix.

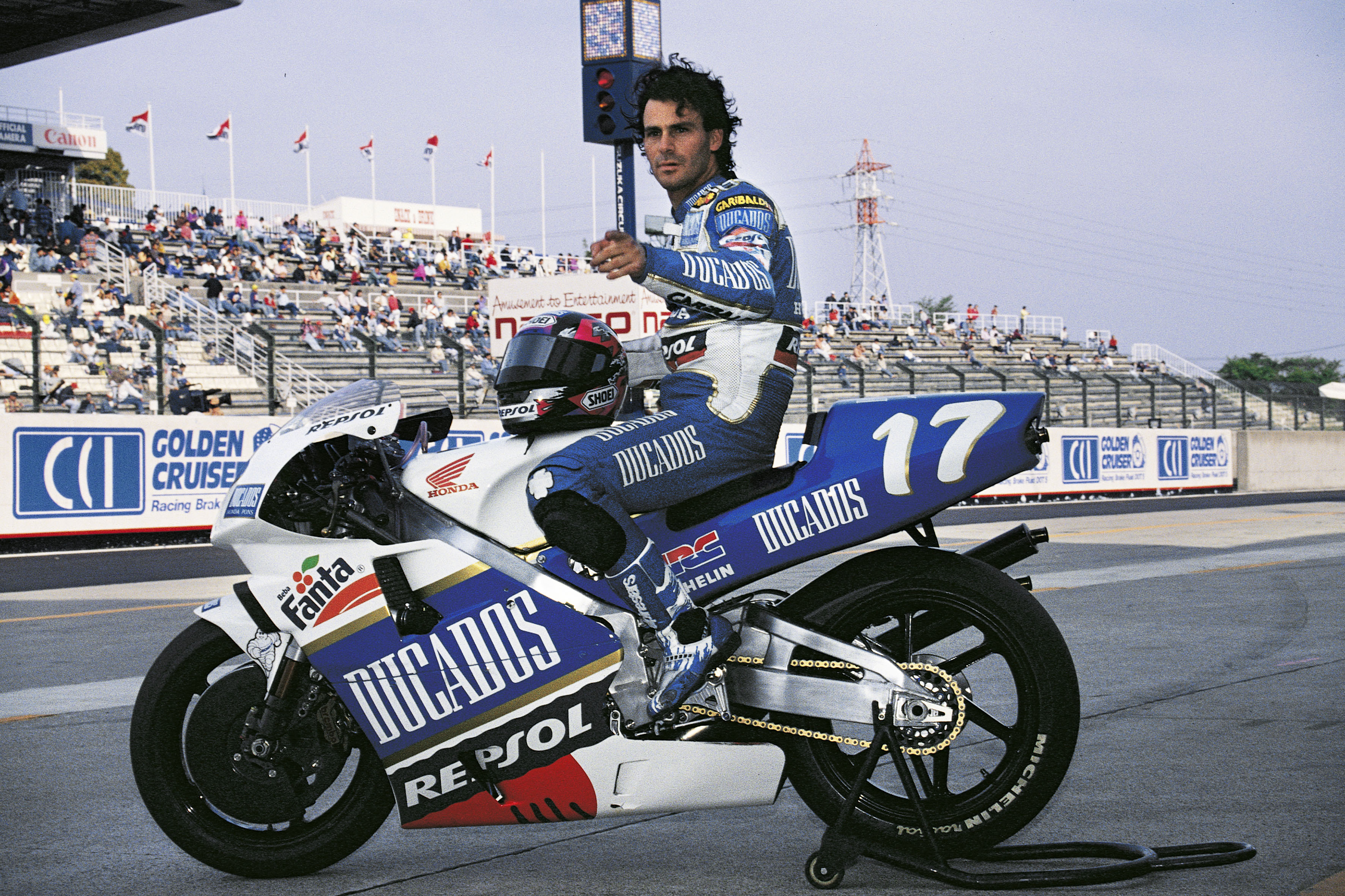
Alberto Puig with his Honda NSR500 at Suzuka in 1994

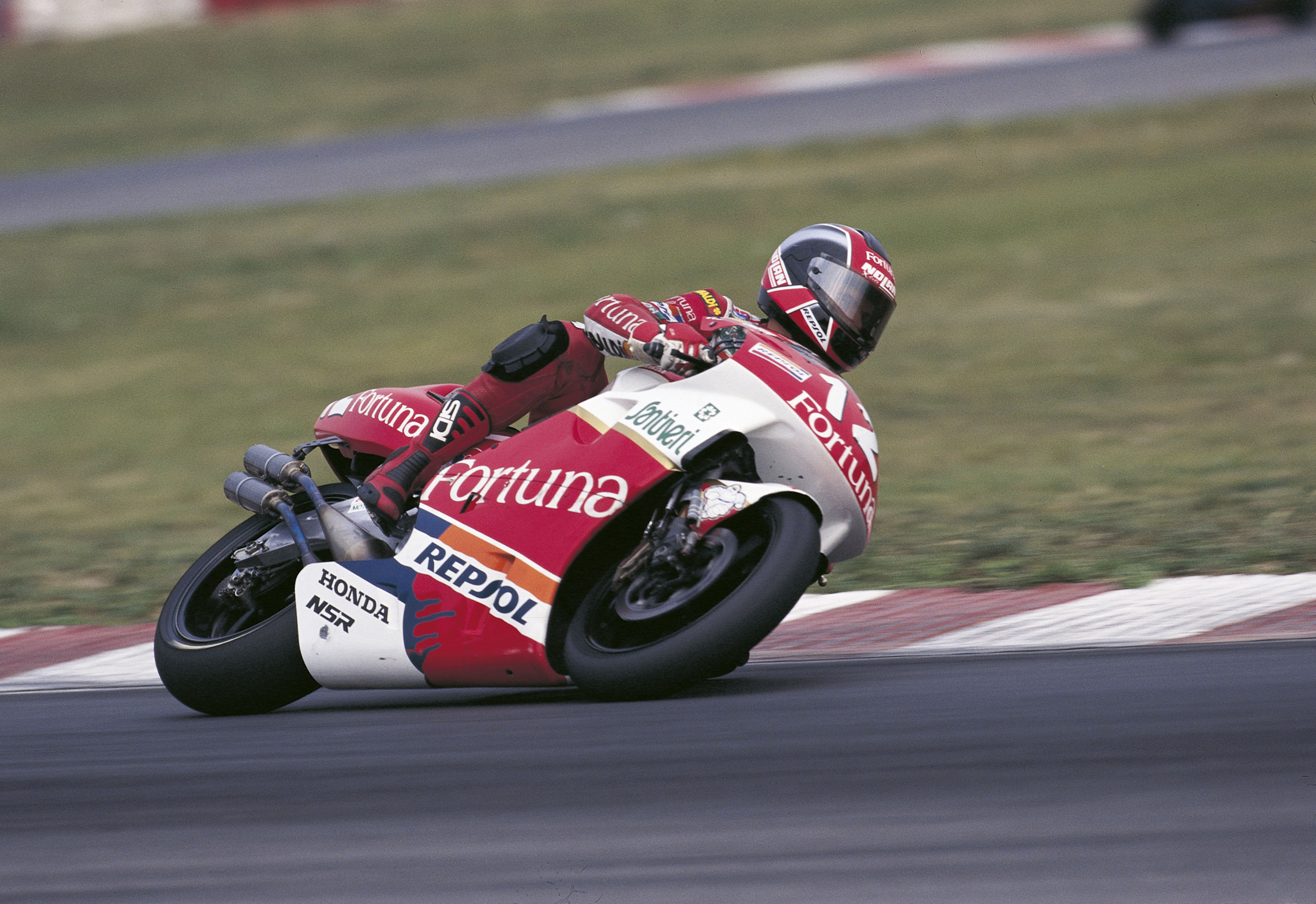
Carlos Checa riding his Honda NSR500 at the 1995 Argentinian Grand Prix

Carlos Checa riding his Honda NSR500 at the 1997 German Grand Prix.

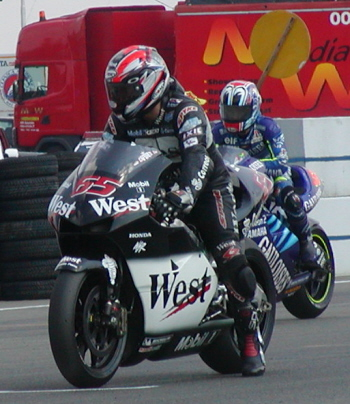
Loris Capirossi riding his West-liveried Honda NSR500 at the 2002 Czech Grand Prix.

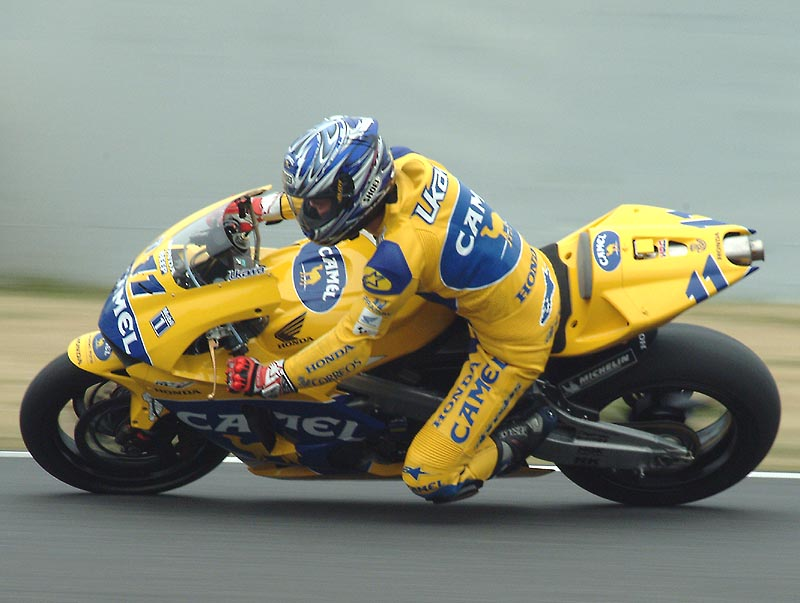
Tohru Ukawa riding his Camel-liveried Honda RC211V during the 2003 Japanese Grand Prix.

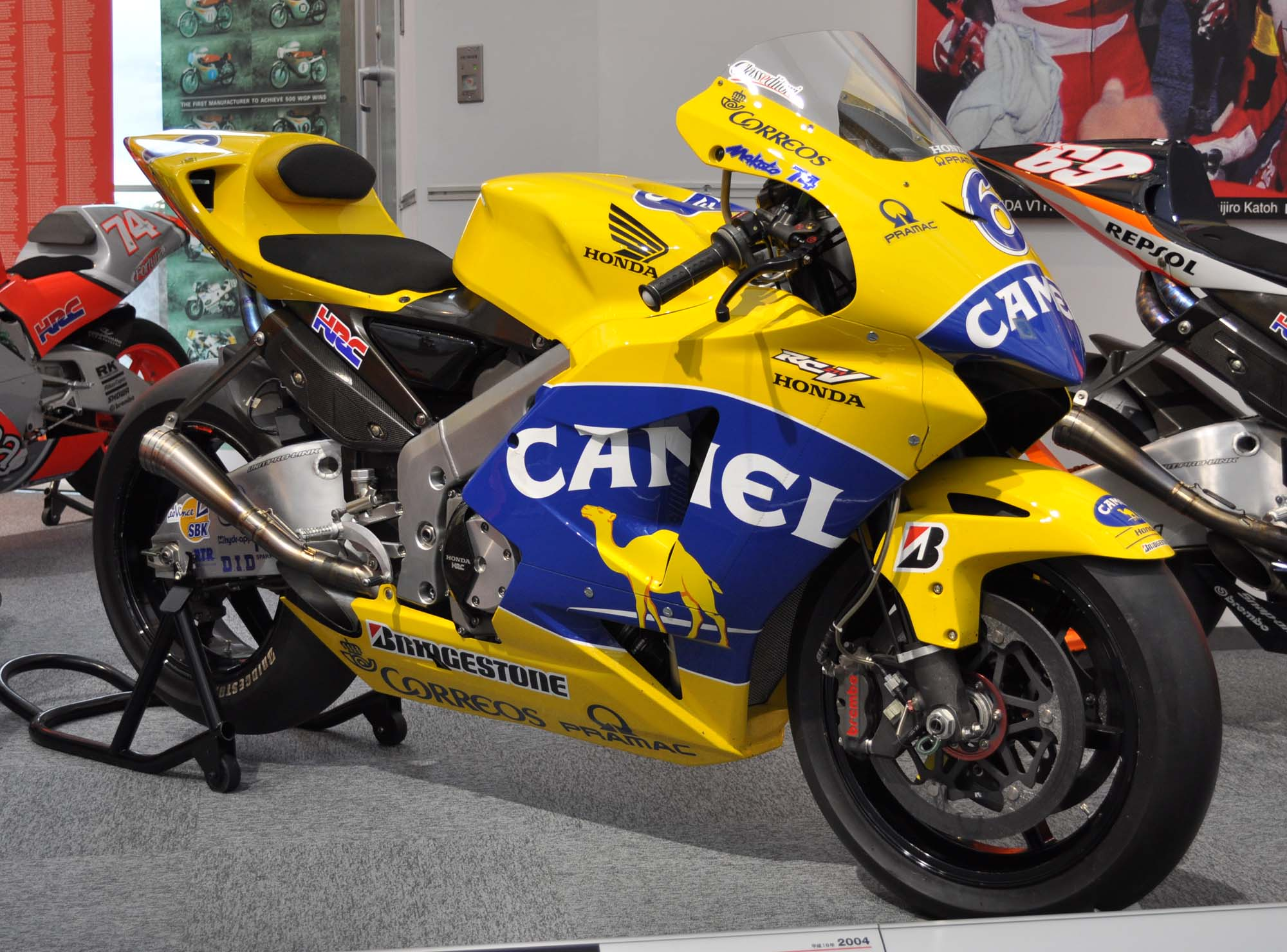
Makoto Tamada's 2004 Honda RC211V in display at the Honda Collection Hall

Troy Bayliss riding his Honda RC211V at the 2005 British Grand Prix in Donington Park.

== Pramac Racing ==
Pramac Racing is a motorcycle racing team currently competing in the MotoGP World Championship. The team was created in 2002 by Italian company Pramac. In 2005 Pramac Racing joined forces with d'Antin MotoGP to form Pramac d'Antin and in 2007 the team became part of the Pramac Group. After d'Antin left the team in 2008, the team became known as Pramac Racing.

=== MotoGP ===
Year	Main colour(s)	Additional colour(s)	Main sponsor(s)	Additional major sponsor(s)	Notes
2002	White	Red	None	Dunlop, Strabila, Sisam Group, Hydr-app, F.D. Knitwear, Rimondi Bologna, Vlfr M.E. CA, Cattolica Assicurazioni, Musashi, NGK, D.I.D, Brembo	
2003	White	Red	None	Bridgestone, NGK, D.I.D, Diadora, Cattolica Assicurazioni, Arrow (motorcycle part manufacturer), Brembo	
2005	Red	Black	None	Dunlop, Ticino Hosting, Shoei, Roda Golf & Beach Resort, Delcam, Beta Tools, AFAM, Regina Chain, Brembo	
2006	Black	White	None	Dunlop, Duja, BNL, Calidona, Beta Tools, AFAM, Regina Chain, Brembo	
2007	White	Red, black	None	Bridgestone, Gaviota Simbac, Calidona, Sportal, Boxeur Des Rues, Motocard, Vassalli, G.P.R, Agip, AFAM, Regina Chain, Brembo	
2008	Red	White, black	Alice	Bridgestone, Calidona, Efecto2000, Boxeur Des Rues, Kerself, Gruppo MPS, Humangest, BNL, Sparkle, Motocard, Hydr-app, Regina Chain, Brembo	
2009	Red, white	Black	None	Bridgestone, Powermate by Pramac, Boxeur Des Rues, Midac Batteries, Lifter, Kerself, Energy Resources, AMG, Chiavalli, Brembo	
2010	Green	White	None	Bridgestone, Boxeur Des Rues, Eni, Midac Batteries, Kerself, Lifter, Energy Resources, AMG, Chiavalli, Brembo	
2011	White	Green, yellow, black	None	Bridgestone, Eni, Boxeur Des Rues, Riello Ups, Valmy, FAAM, Iveco, Regina Chain, Brembo	
2012	White, green	Yellow, black	None	Bridgestone, Riello Ups, AION, Powermate by Pramac, Temporary Agenzia, Eni, Valmy, ABEA, Iveco, OC Oerlikon, FAAM, Lavorint, SC Project, Regina Chain, Brembo	
2013	White, red	Black	Energy T.I (Andrea Iannone)/Ignite Asset Management (Ben Spies)	Bridgestone, SC Project, Brembo	
2014	White, red	Black	Energy T.I/None	Bridgestone, Shell, Riello Ups, Lifter, Akrapovič, Brembo	
2015	White, red	Green, black	None/Octo	Bridgestone, Shell, FIAMM, CMC, Riello Ups, B3, Lifter, Akrapovič, Brembo	
2016	Red, white	Blue, black	Yakhnich	Michelin, Shell, FIAMM, Riello Ups, B3, Lifter, Jupiter, NudeAudio, Akrapovič, Brembo	
2017	Red, white	Blue, black	Octo	Michelin, Shell, FIAMM, Lifter, B3, Prettl, Akrapovič, Brembo	
2018	Red, white	Blue, black	Alma	Michelin, Shell, FIAMM, Lifter, Prettl, Articolo 1, E-care, Akrapovič, Brembo	

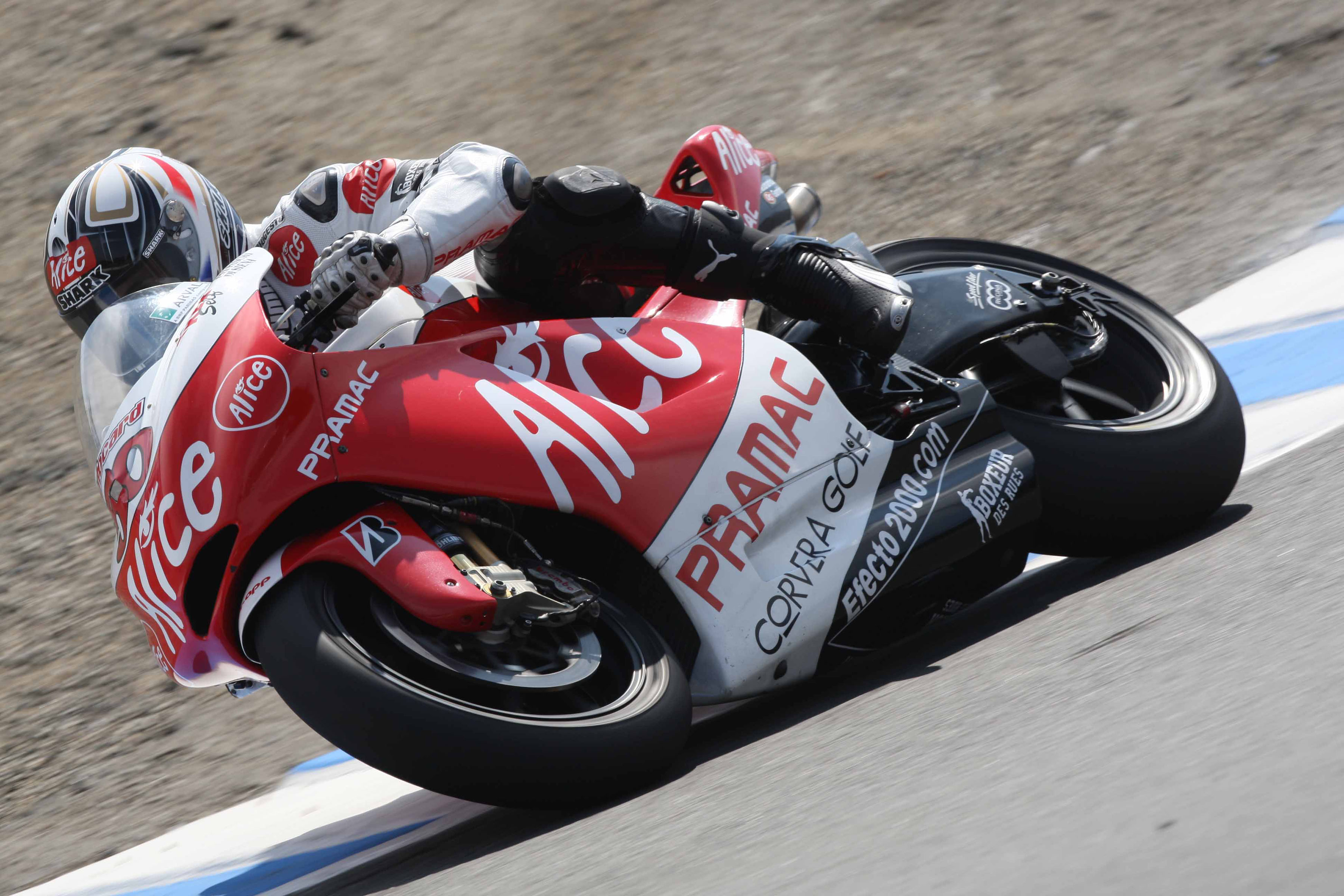
Sylvain Guintoli, riding his Alice Ducati Pramac in the 2008 United States Grand Prix.

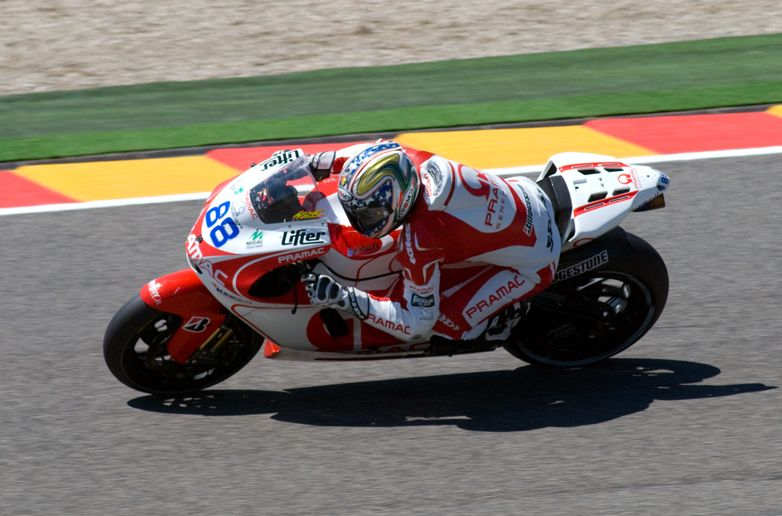
Niccolò Canepa, riding his Ducati Pramac in the 2009 Italian Grand Prix.

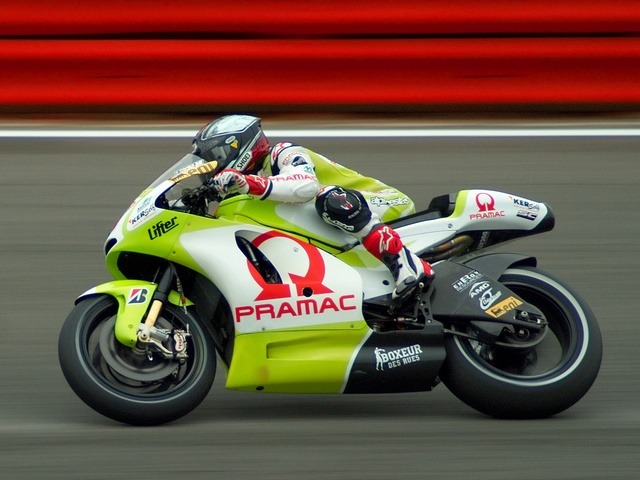
Mika Kallio, riding his Ducati Pramac in the 2010 British Grand Prix.

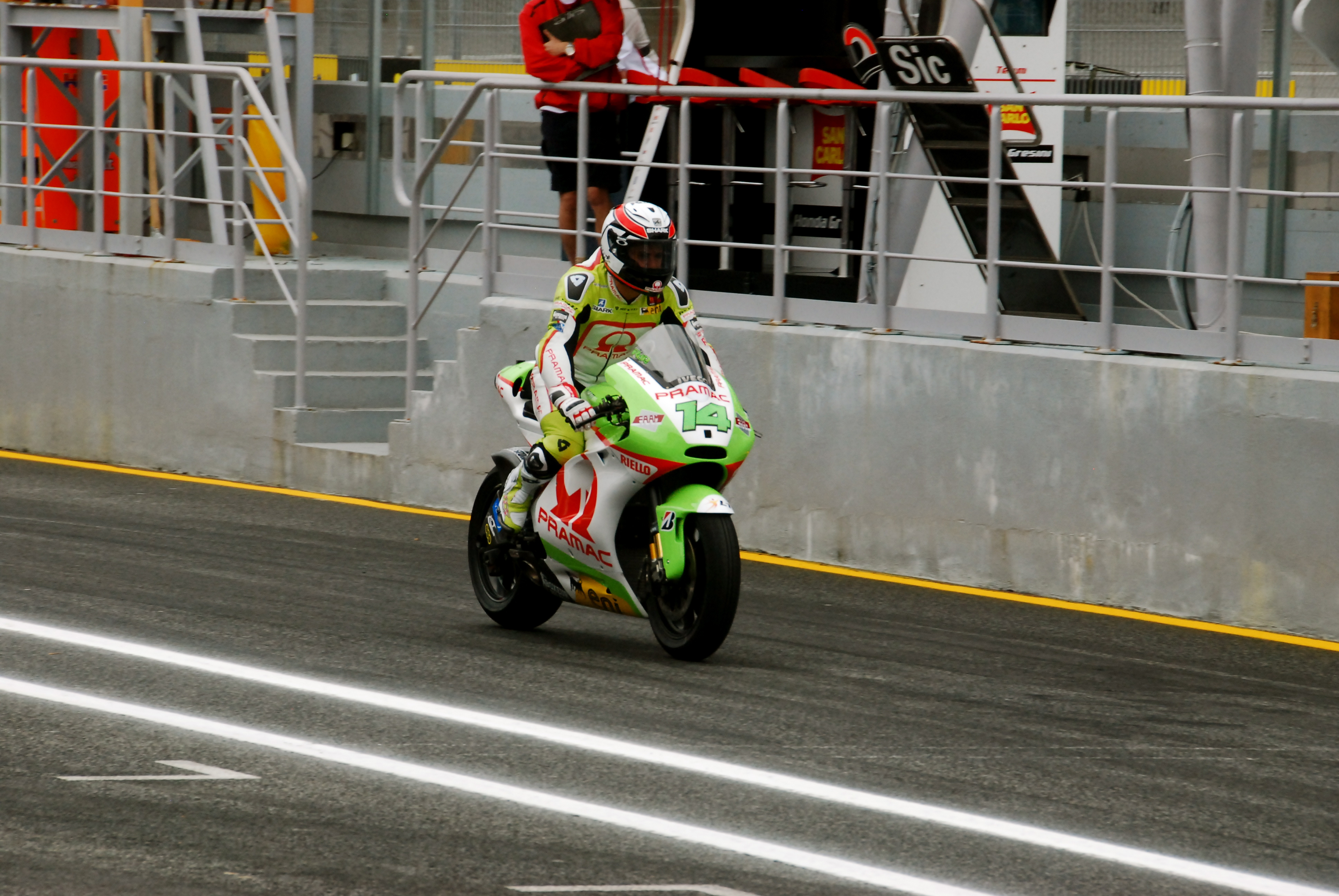
Randy de Puniet, riding his Ducati Pramac in the 2011 Portuguese Grand Prix.

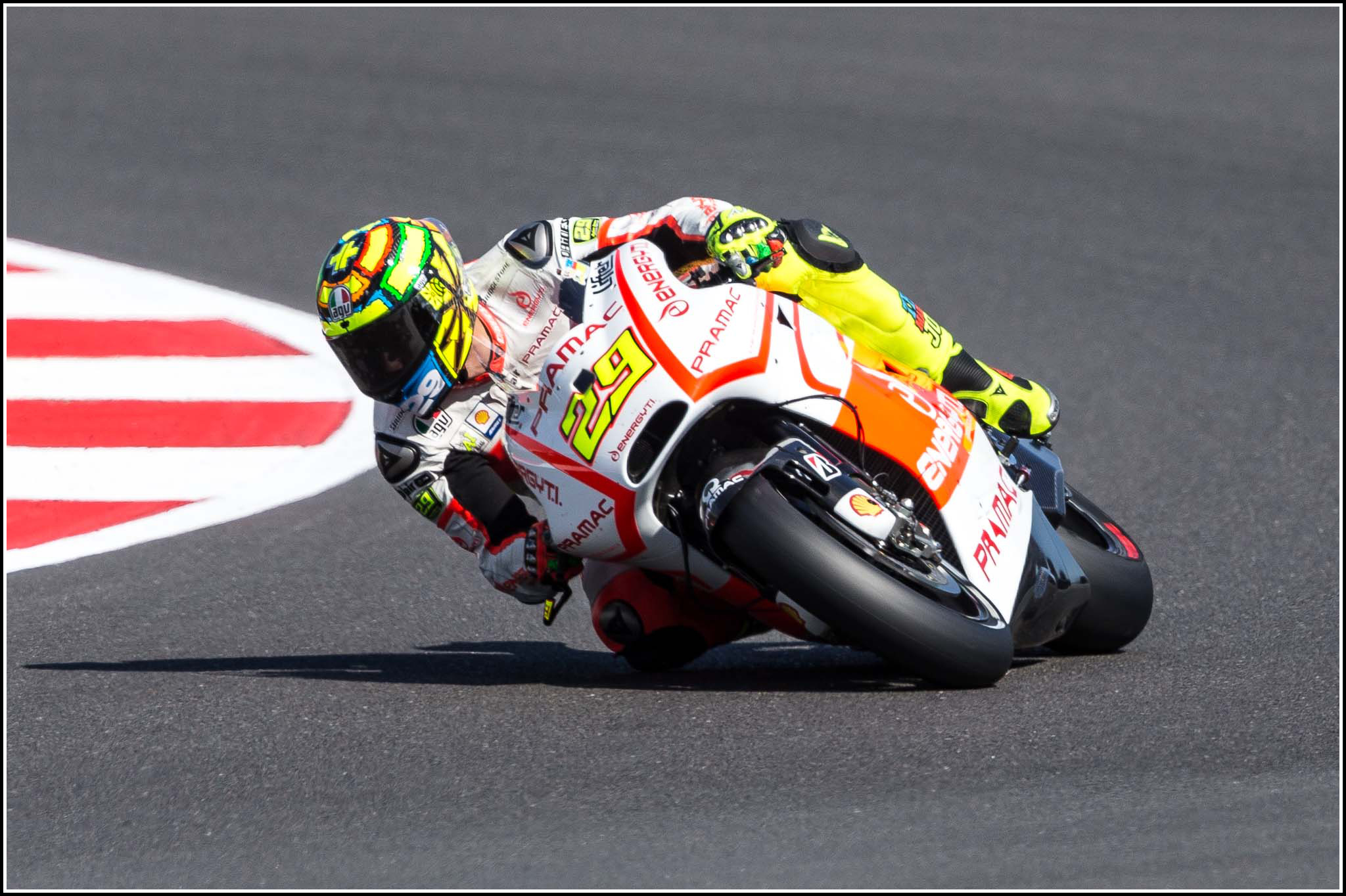
Andrea Iannone, riding his Energy T.I. Ducati Pramac in the 2013 British Grand Prix.

== Suzuki MotoGP ==
Suzuki MotoGP is the official factory-backed team of Suzuki in the MotoGP World Championship. Suzuki first entered a works team in the 500cc Grand Prix World Championship in 1974 with riders Barry Sheene and Findlay riding the Suzuki RG500. A second-place finish by Sheene in the opening round was the best result of the season. The team's first victory came in 1975, a pole-to-finish win by Barry Sheene at the Dutch TT. Sheene finished the season 6th overall with two wins.

Barry Sheene won the riders' championship in 1976 with a total of five wins. Sheene's second 500cc riders' championship came in 1977 with six wins. Teammate Steve Parrish was fifth.

Marco Lucchinelli became the 500cc World Champion in 1981, riding the new Suzuki RG 500 gamma for the Roberto Gallina racing team. Lucchinelli left Suzuki to join Honda in 1982. He was replaced on the Gallina team by Franco Uncini who went on to win the World Championship with five wins. Uncini was severely injured at the Dutch TT at Assen in 1983 and was unable to defend his title. Suzuki withdrew factory support at the end of the season.

After three years away Suzuki returned in 1987 with factory supported entries. While not a full-time return, riders Takumi Itoh and Kevin Schwantz had some good results aboard the new Suzuki RGV500. Suzuki made a full return to racing in 1988 with Schwantz finishing 8th overall with two wins whilst teammate Rob McElnea finished the season in 10th place. With a total of six wins, Schwantz was ranked fourth for the 1989 season.

Schwantz won his long-awaited first World Championship in 1993 with four race wins. His new teammate Alex Barros also scored a win and finished 6th overall.

Kenny Roberts Jr. became World Champion in 2000 with a total of four victories, while Nobuatsu Aoki was 10th overall.

For the 2011 season, the team fielded only one GSV-R for Álvaro Bautista with no replacement for Loris Capirossi, who moved to the Pramac Racing team. At the end of 2011 Suzuki pulled out of MotoGP citing the need to reduce costs amid the global economic downturn.

On 30 September 2014 Suzuki Motor Corporation announced that it would participate in MotoGP from 2015, with Aleix Espargaró and Maverick Viñales as their two riders. They raced a newly developed MotoGP machine, the GSX-RR, with a restructured team organisation led by Davide Brivio.

=== 500cc/MotoGP ===
Year	Main colour(s)	Additional colour(s)	Main sponsor(s)	Additional major sponsor(s)	Notes
1989	White	Red, Blue, Light blue	Pepsi	Michelin, Motul, NGK, RK Takasago Chain, Kayaba	
1990	White	Red, gold	Lucky Strike	Michelin, Motul, NGK, RK Takasago Chain, Kayaba	
1991	White	Red, gold	Lucky Strike	Michelin, Motul, NGK, RK Takasago Chain, Kayaba	
1992	White	Red, gold	Lucky Strike	Michelin, Motul, NGK, RK Takasago Chain, Kayaba	
1993	White	Red, gold	Lucky Strike	Michelin, Motul, NGK, RK Takasago Chain, Kayaba	
1994	White, red	Gold	Lucky Strike	Michelin, Motul, NGK, RK Takasago Chain, Kayaba	
1995	White, red	Gold	Lucky Strike	Michelin, Motul, NGK, RK Takasago Chain, Kayaba	
1996	White, red	Gold	Lucky Strike	Michelin, Motul, NGK, RK Takasago Chain, Kayaba	
1997	White, red	Gold	Lucky Strike	Michelin, Motul, NGK, RK Takasago Chain, Kayaba	
1998	Blue, white	Black	None	Michelin, Motul, NGK, RK Takasago Chain, Showa	
1999	Blue, white	Black	None	Michelin, Motul, NGK, RK Takasago Chain, D.I.D, Showa	
2000	Blue, yellow	Red	Telefónica, Movistar	Michelin, Motul, NGK, 2D, Brembo, Öhlins	
2001	Blue, yellow	Red	Telefónica, Movistar	Michelin, Fortuna, Motul, NGK, 2D, Brembo, Öhlins	Fortuna logos replaced with "For" in countries where tobacco sponsorship was forbidden.
2002	Blue, yellow	Red	Telefónica, Movistar	Michelin, Dunlop, Motul, NGK, 2D	
2003	Blue, black	Red	None	Michelin, Motul, Mitsubishi, Pops Yoshimura, Kokusan Denki, Benfield Sports International, Brembo	
2004	Blue	White, red	None	Bridgestone, Motul, Mitsubishi, Pops Yoshimura, Kokusan Denki, RK Takasago Chain, NGK, D.I.D, Benfield Sports International, Brembo	
2005	Blue	White, red	None, Red Bull (round 8)	Bridgestone, Motul, Mitsubishi, Pops Yoshimura, Kokusan Denki, Crescent, Mac Tools, NGK, D.I.D, AFAM	
2006	Light blue	Yellow, white, red, black	Rizla	Bridgestone, Motul, Mitsubishi, Pops Yoshimura, Kokusan Denki, Mac Tools, NGK, D.I.D, AFAM, Crescent	Rizla logos removed in countries where tobacco sponsorship was forbidden.
2007	Light blue	Yellow, white, dark blue, red, black	Rizla	Bridgestone, Motul, Mitsubishi, Pops Yoshimura, Kokusan Denki, Mac Tools, NGK, D.I.D, AFAM, Crescent	Rizla logos removed in countries where tobacco sponsorship was forbidden.
2008	Light blue	Yellow, red, black	Rizla	Bridgestone, Motul, Mitsubishi, Pops Yoshimura, Kokusan Denki, Mac Tools, NGK, D.I.D, AFAM, Lumberjack	Rizla logos removed in countries where tobacco sponsorship was forbidden.
2009	Light blue	Yellow, red, black	Rizla	Bridgestone, Motul, Mitsubishi, Pops Yoshimura, Kokusan Denki, Mac Tools, NGK, D.I.D, AFAM	Rizla logos removed in countries where tobacco sponsorship was forbidden.
2010	Light blue	Yellow, dark blue, red, black	Rizla	Bridgestone, Motul, Mitsubishi, Pops Yoshimura, Kokusan Denki, Mac Tools, NGK, D.I.D, AFAM	Rizla logos removed in countries where tobacco sponsorship was forbidden.
2011	Light blue	Yellow, red, black	Rizla	Bridgestone, Motul, Mitsubishi, Pops Yoshimura, Kokusan Denki, Mac Tools, NGK, RK Takasago Chain, D.I.D, AFAM, Akrapovič	Rizla logos changed with the riders' numbers or removed in countries where tobacco sponsorship was forbidden.
2015	Dark blue	White, red	None	Bridgestone, Motul, Ecstar, RK Takasago Chain, NGK, Beta Tools	
2016	Dark blue	White, yellow, red	None	Michelin, Motul, Ecstar, RK Takasago Chain, NGK, Beta Tools, Akrapovič	
2017	Dark blue	White, yellow, red	None	Michelin, Motul, Ecstar, RK Takasago Chain, NGK, Beta Tools, Akrapovič	
2018	Dark blue	White, yellow, red	None	Michelin, Motul, Ecstar, RK Takasago Chain, NGK, Beta Tools, Akrapovič	
2021	Dark blue	White, yellow, red	None	Michelin, Motul, D.I.D, Ecstar, RK Takasago Chain, Monster Energy, NGK, TAICHI, Beta Tools, Akrapovič	
2022	Dark blue	White, yellow, red	None	Michelin, Motul, Estrella Galicia 0.0%, D.I.D, Ecstar, RK Takasago Chain, Monster Energy, NGK, TAICHI, Beta Tools, Akrapovič	

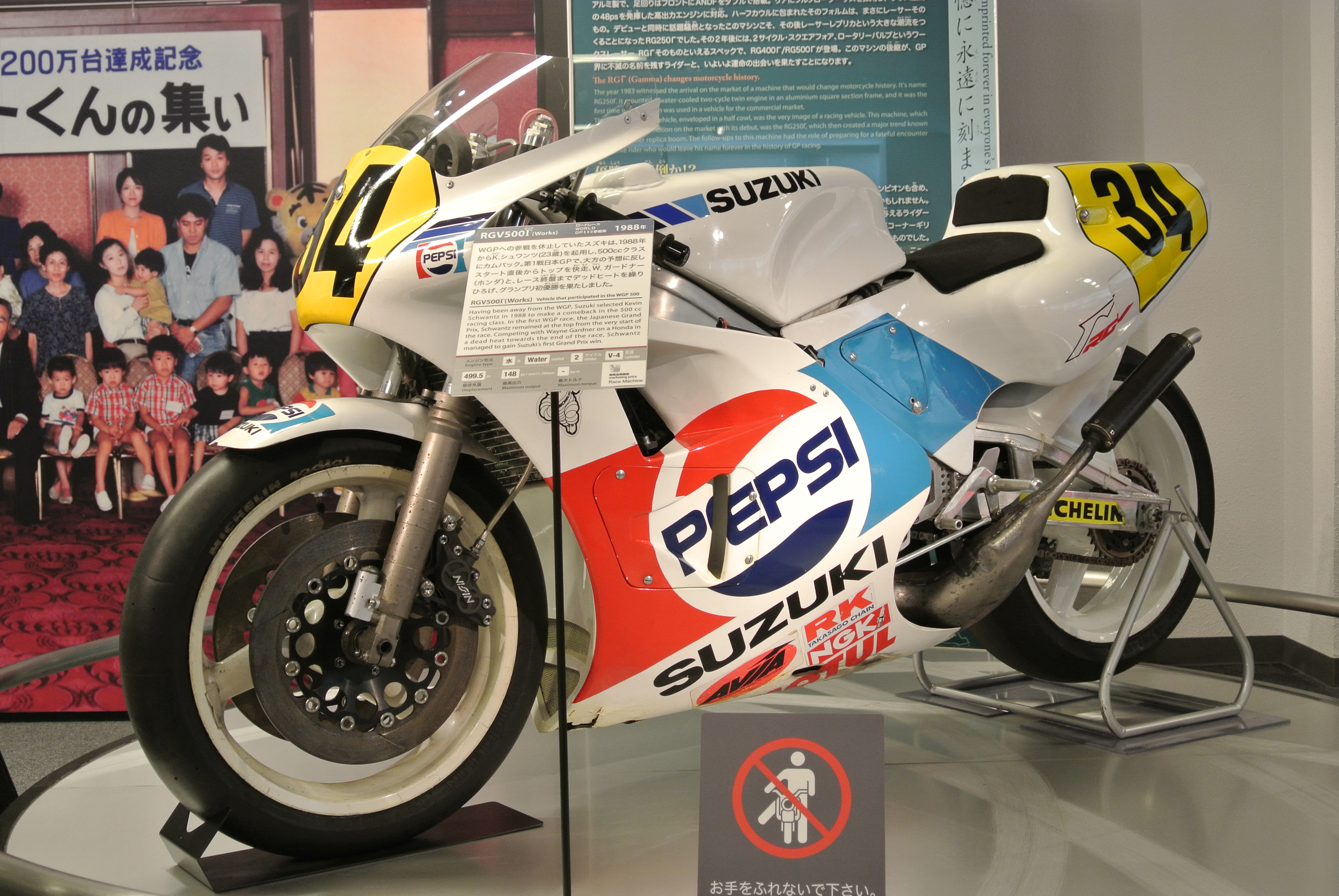
The Pepsi Suzuki RGV500, ridden by Kevin Schwantz in the 1989 season, on display.

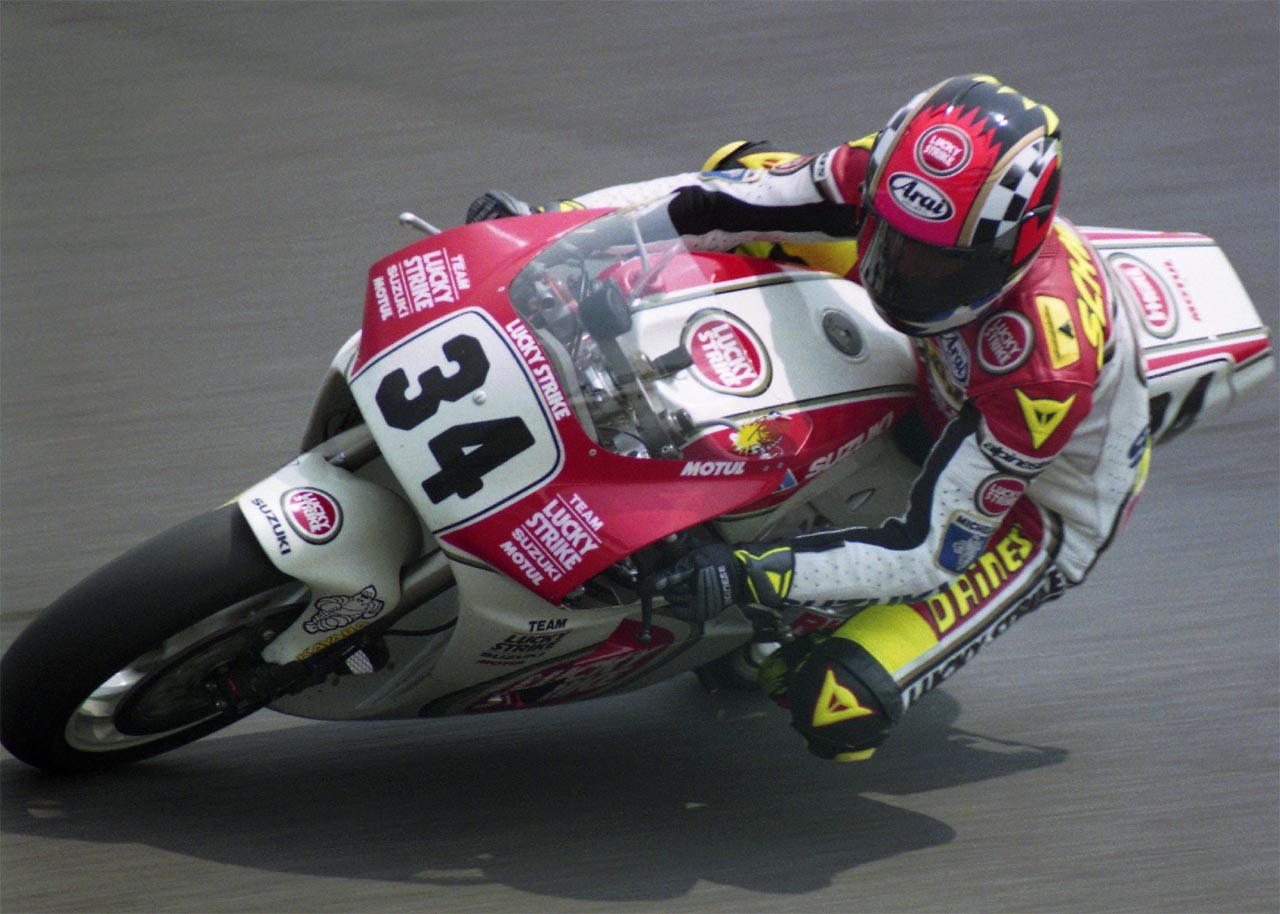
Kevin Schwantz riding his Lucky Strike Suzuki RGV500 at the 1993 Japanese Grand Prix.

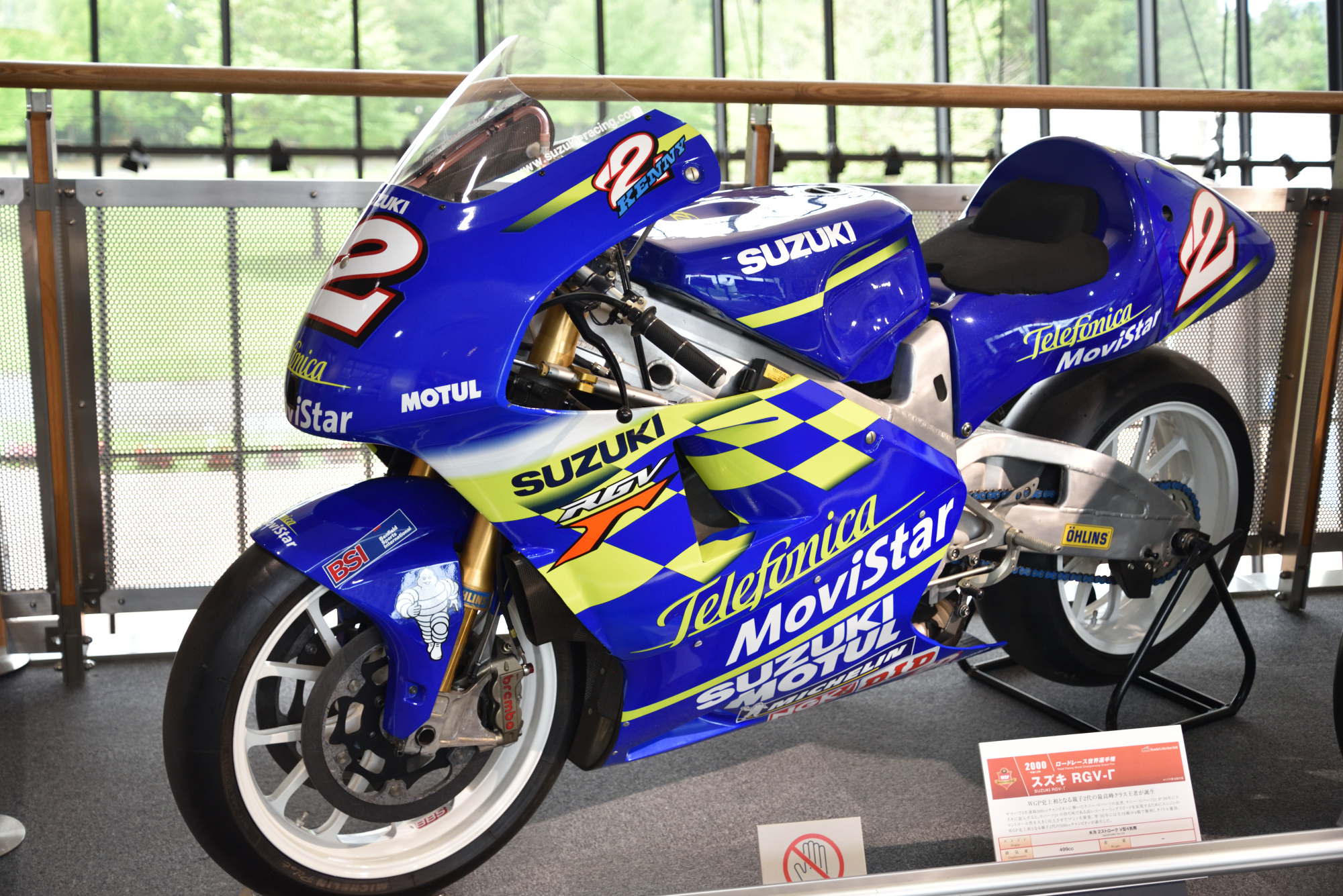
The Telefónica Movistar Suzuki RGV500, ridden by Kenny Roberts Jr. in the 2000 season on display.

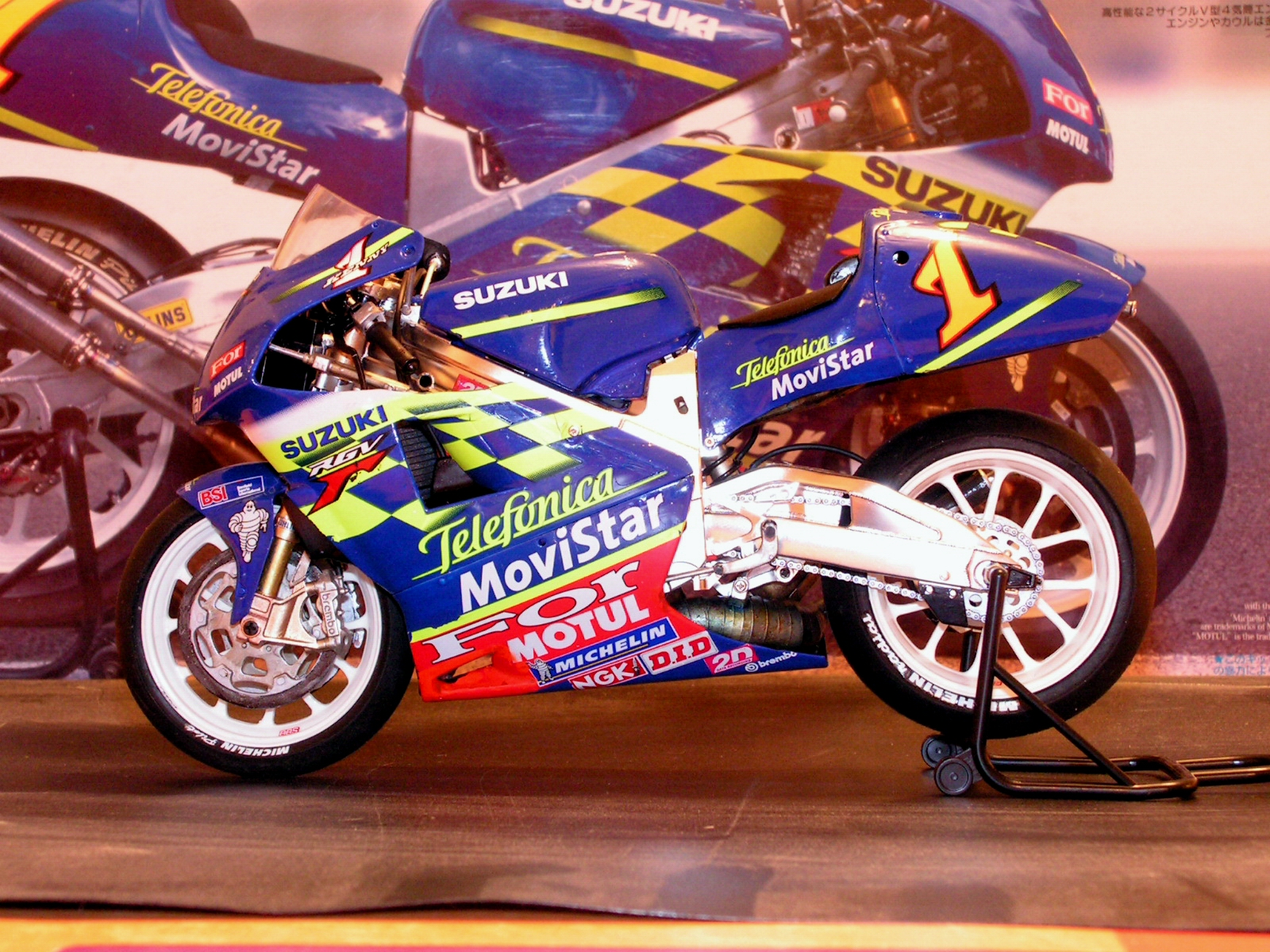
The Telefónica Movistar Suzuki RGV500, ridden by Kenny Roberts Jr. in the 2001 season on display.

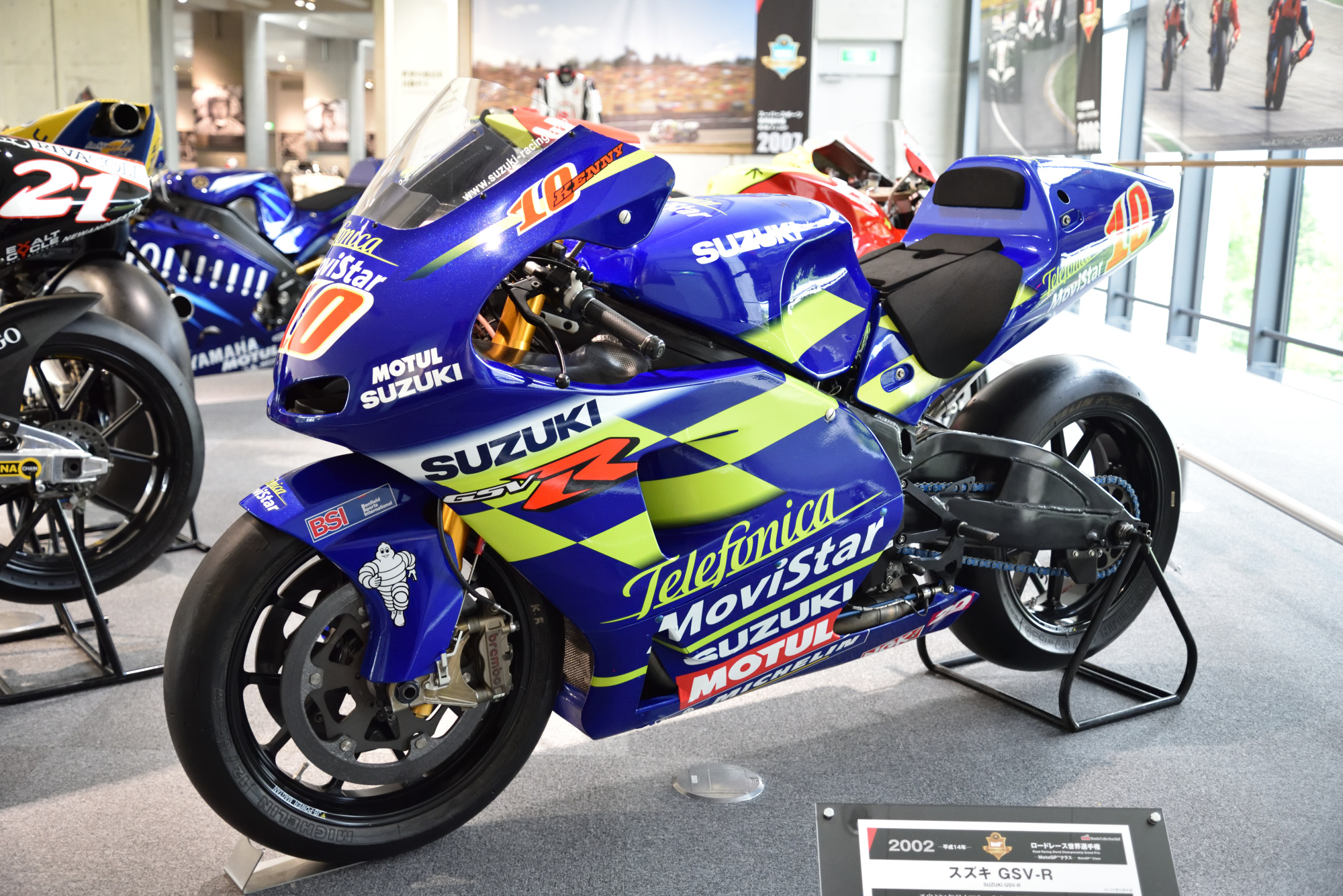
The Telefónica Movistar Suzuki GSV-R, ridden by Kenny Roberts Jr. in the 2002 season on display.

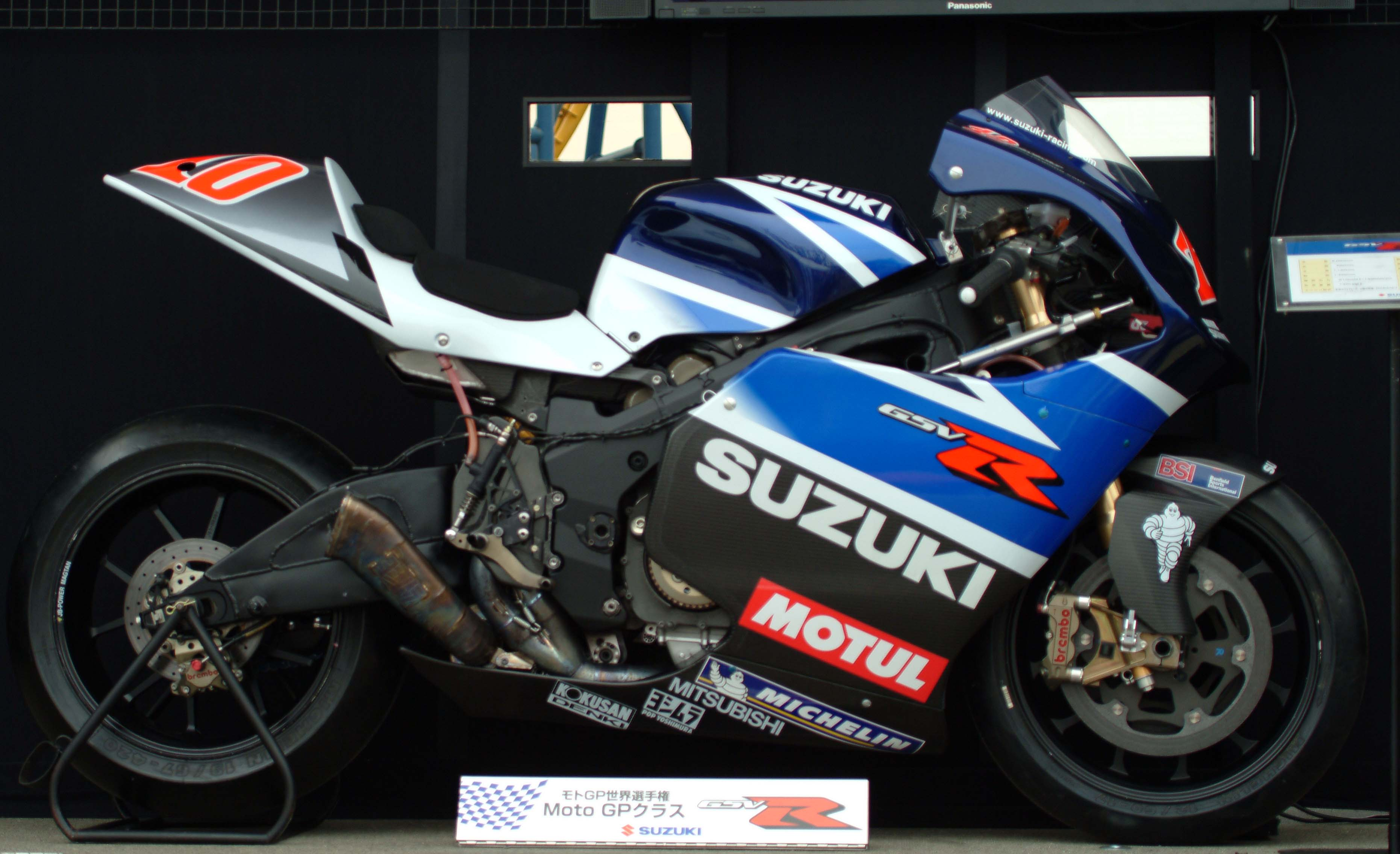
The Suzuki GSV-R, ridden by Kenny Roberts Jr. in the 2003 season on display.

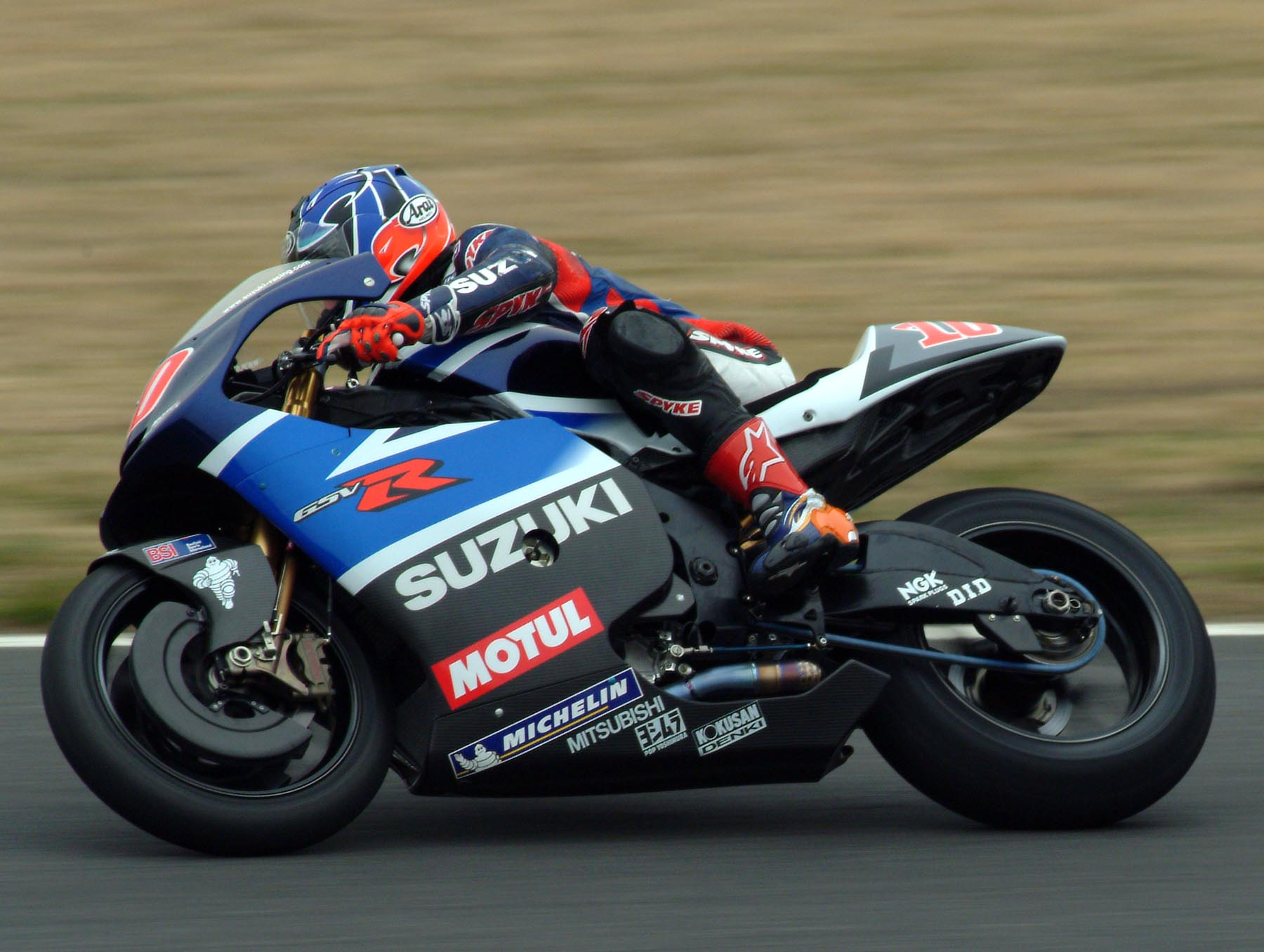
Kenny Roberts Jr. riding his Suzuki GSV-R at the 2003 Japanese Grand Prix.

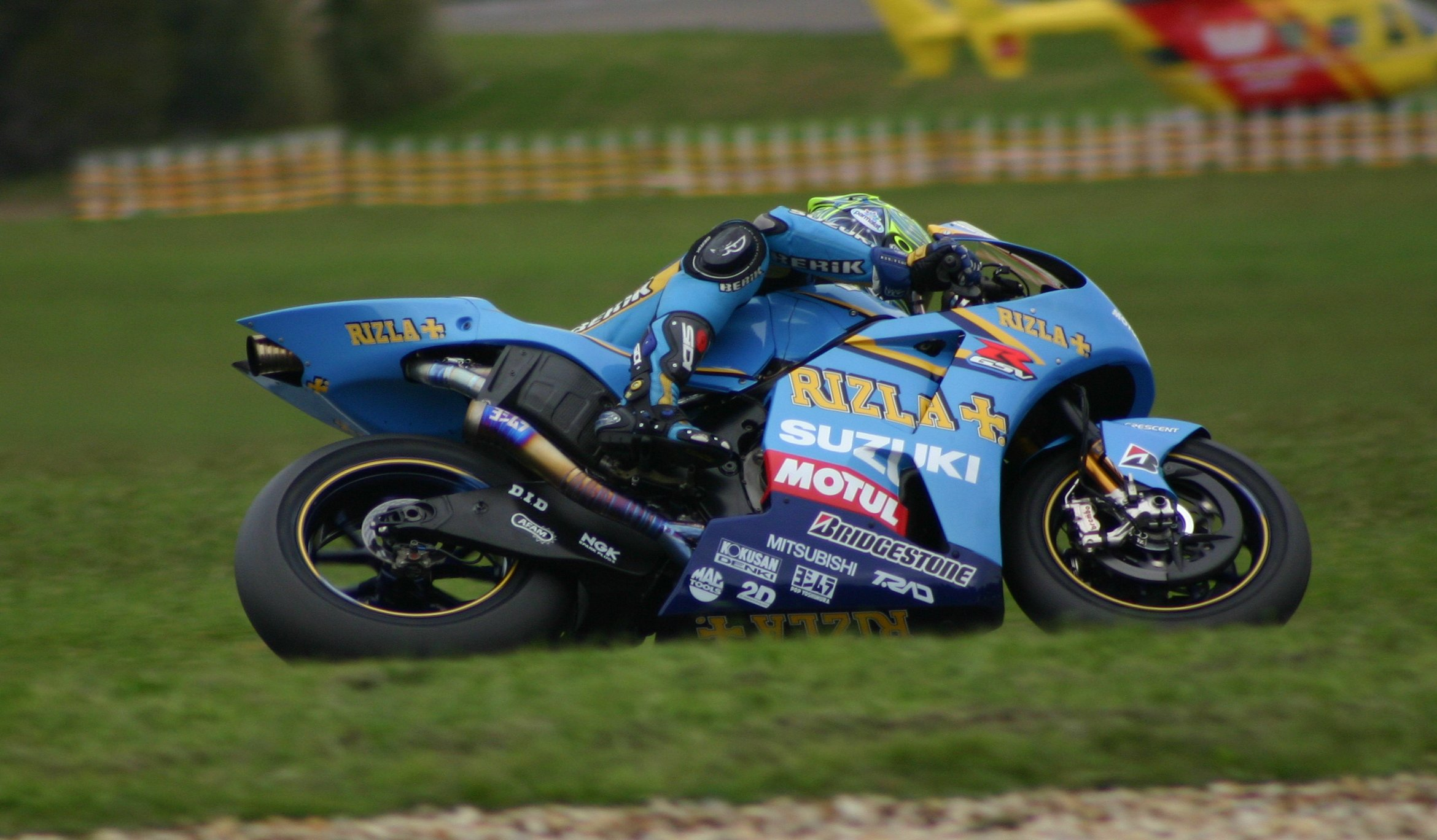
Chris Vermeulen riding his Rizla Suzuki GSV-R at the 2006 Australian Grand Prix.

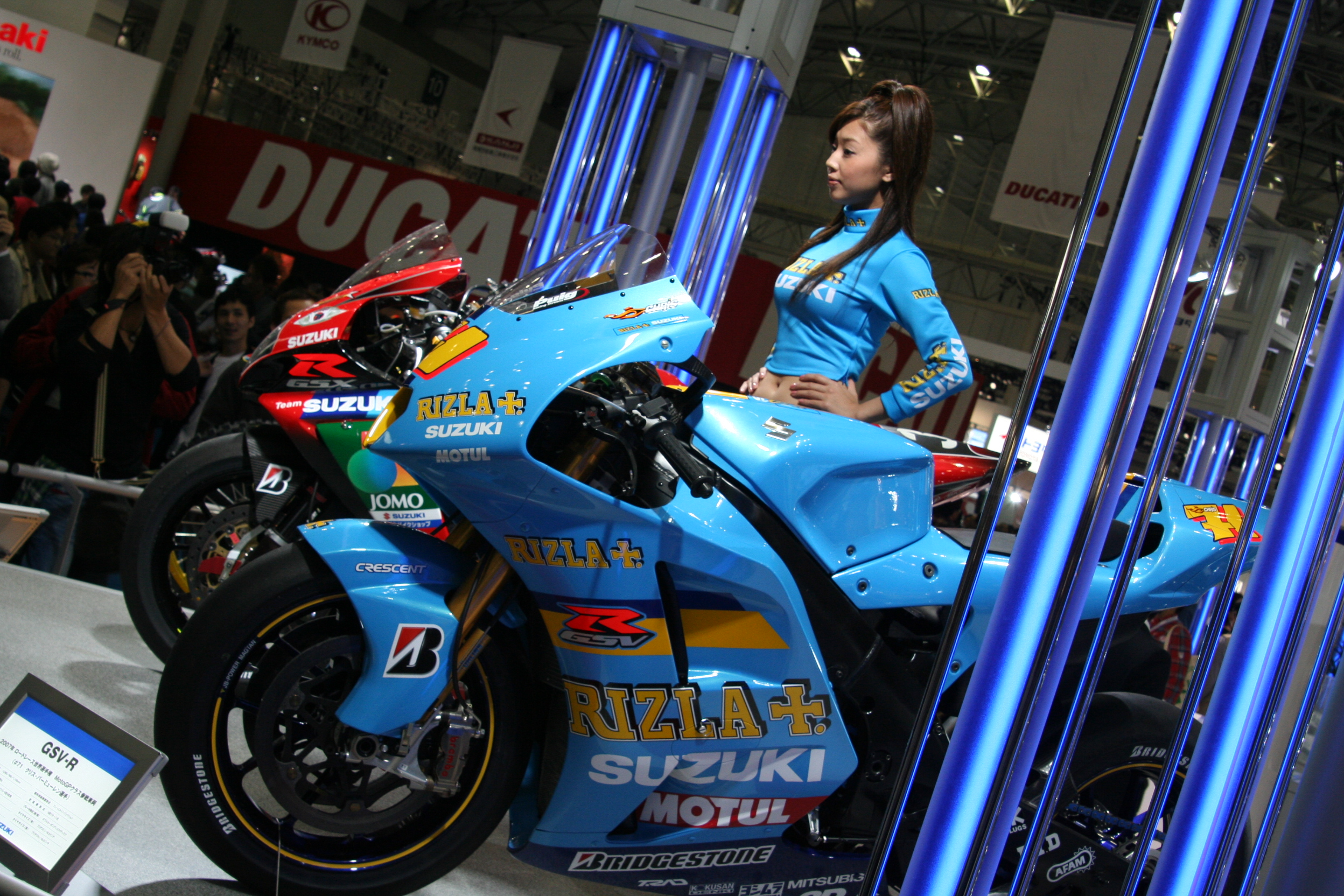
The Rizla Suzuki GSV-R, ridden by Chris Vermeulen in the 2007 season on display.

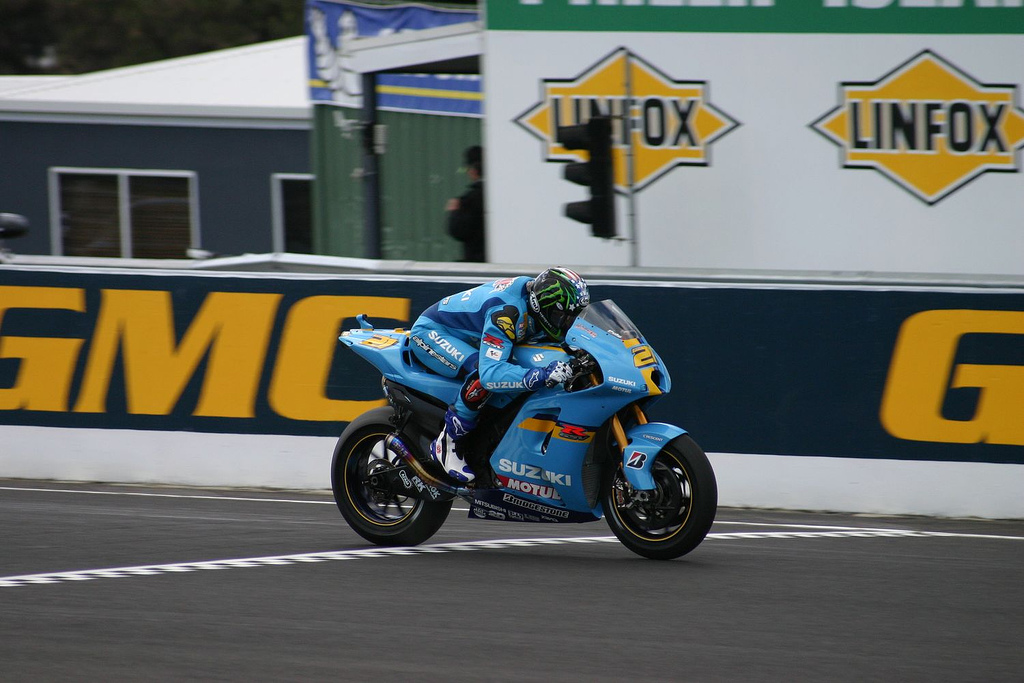
John Hopkins, riding his 2007 Rizla Suzuki GSV-R. The Rizla logos have been removed to comply with the anti-tobacco laws set in place in most countries at the time.

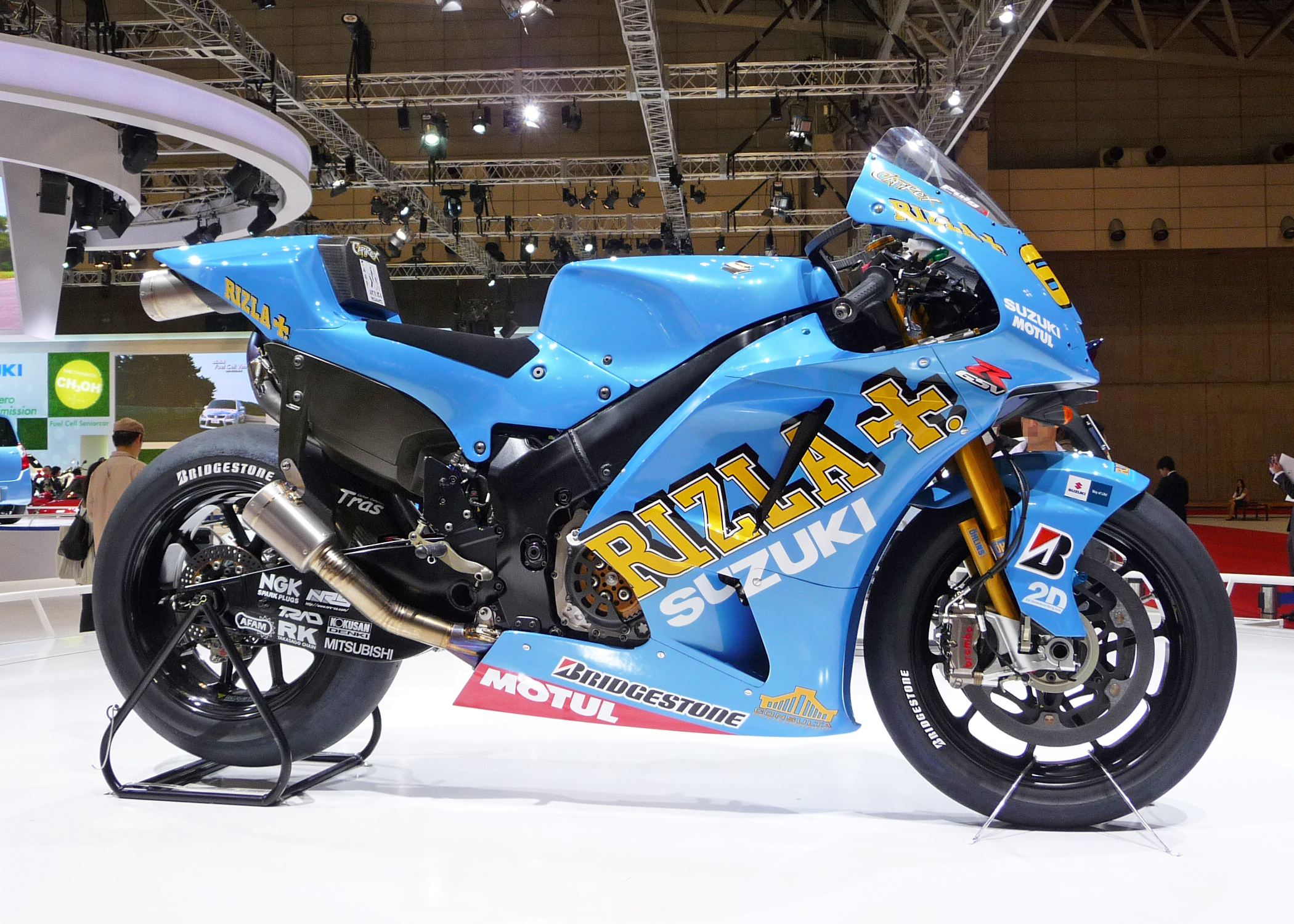
The Rizla Suzuki GSV-R, ridden by Loris Capirossi in the 2009 season on display.

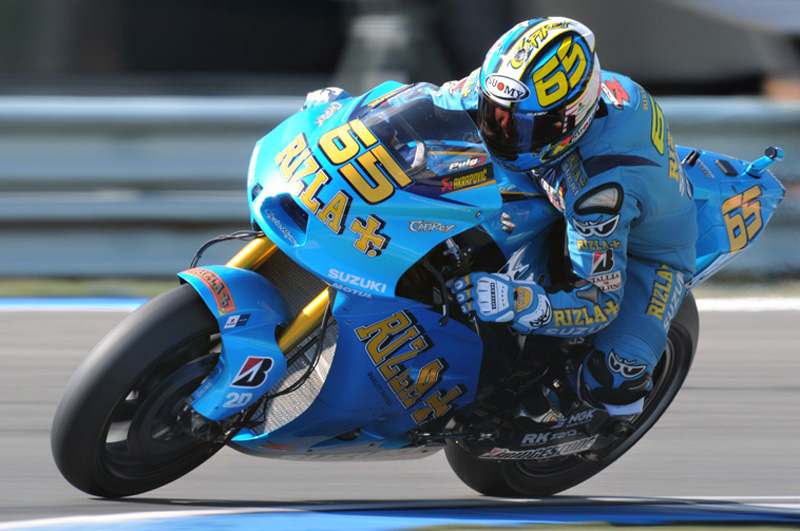
Loris Capirossi riding his Rizla Suzuki GSV-R at the 2010 Dutch TT in Assen.

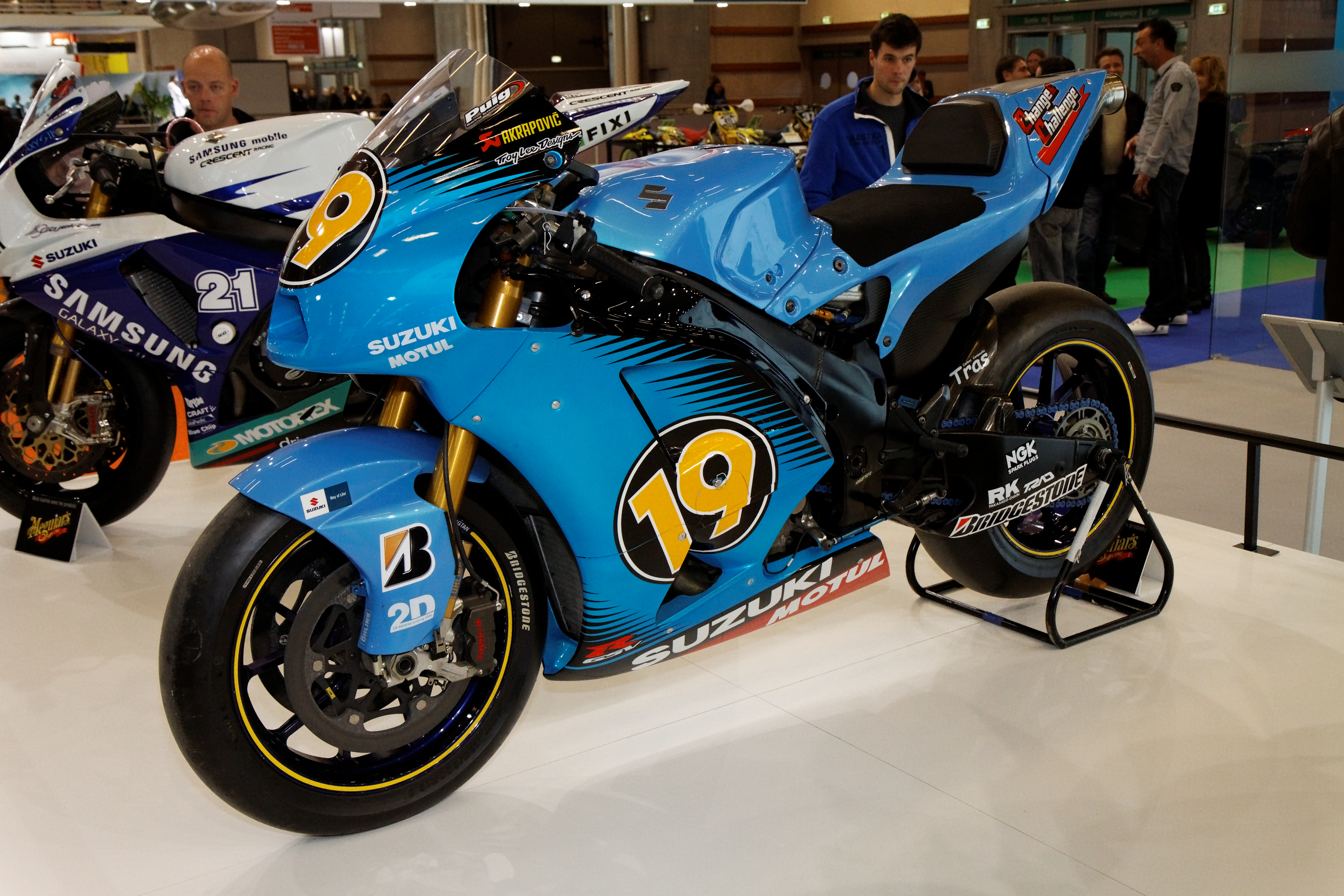
The Rizla Suzuki GSV-R, ridden by Álvaro Bautista in the 2011 season on display. The Rizla logo's have been removed and replaced with the rider's number.

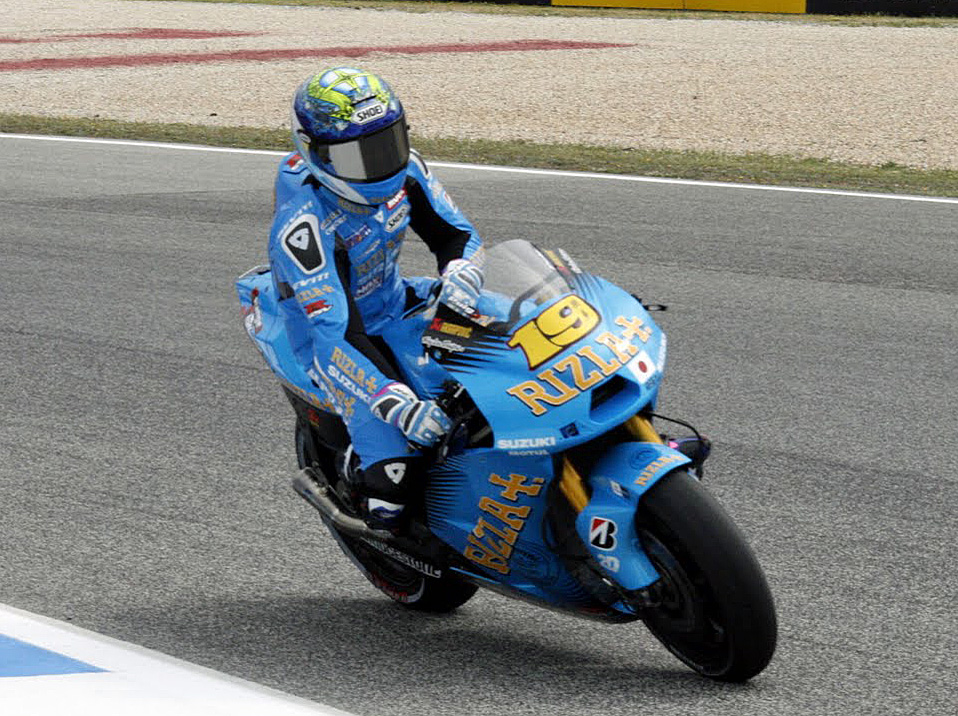
Álvaro Bautista, riding his Rizla Suzuki GSV-R at the 2011 Portuguese Grand Prix.

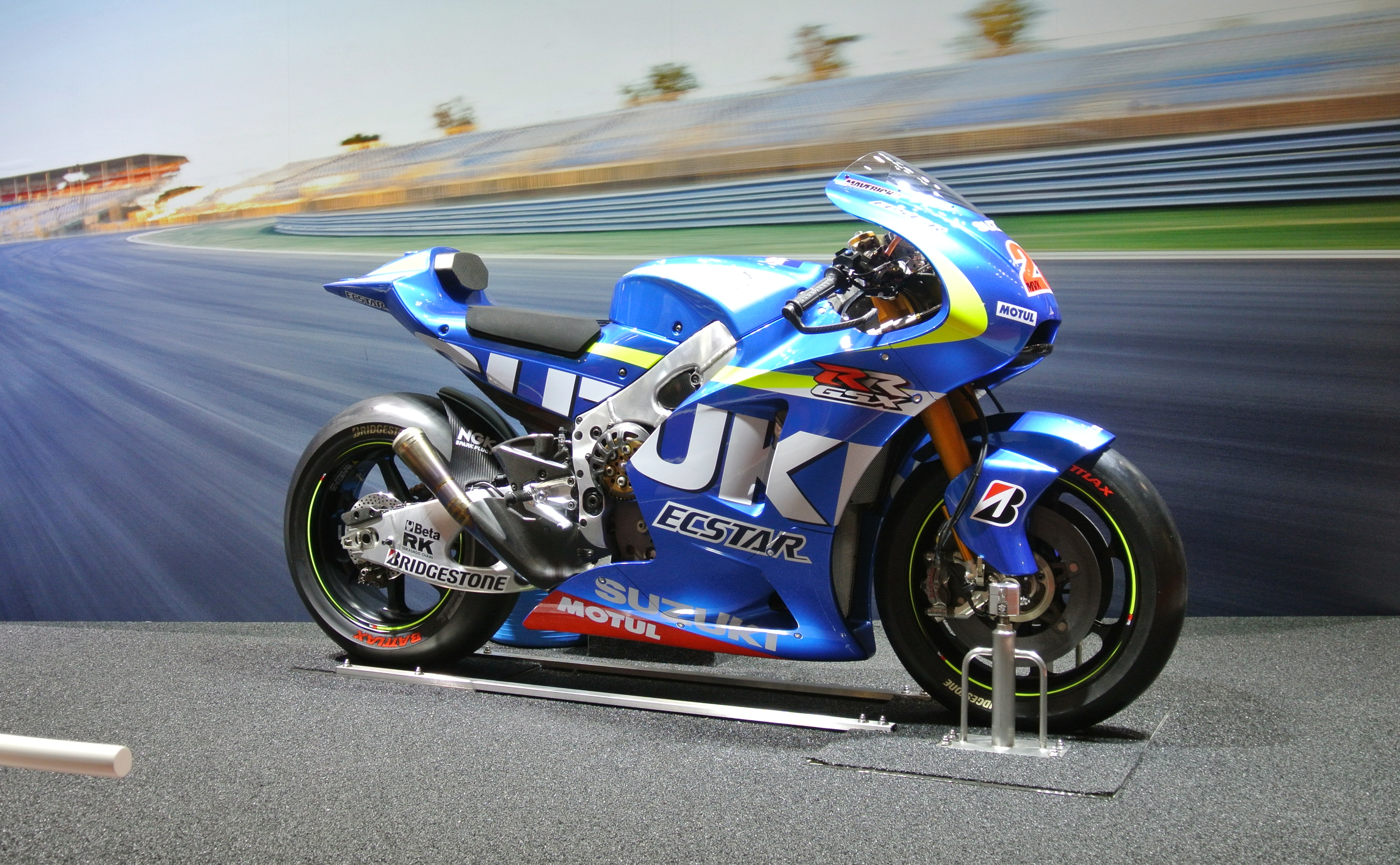
The Ecstar Suzuki GSX-RR, ridden by Maverick Viñales in the 2015 season on display.

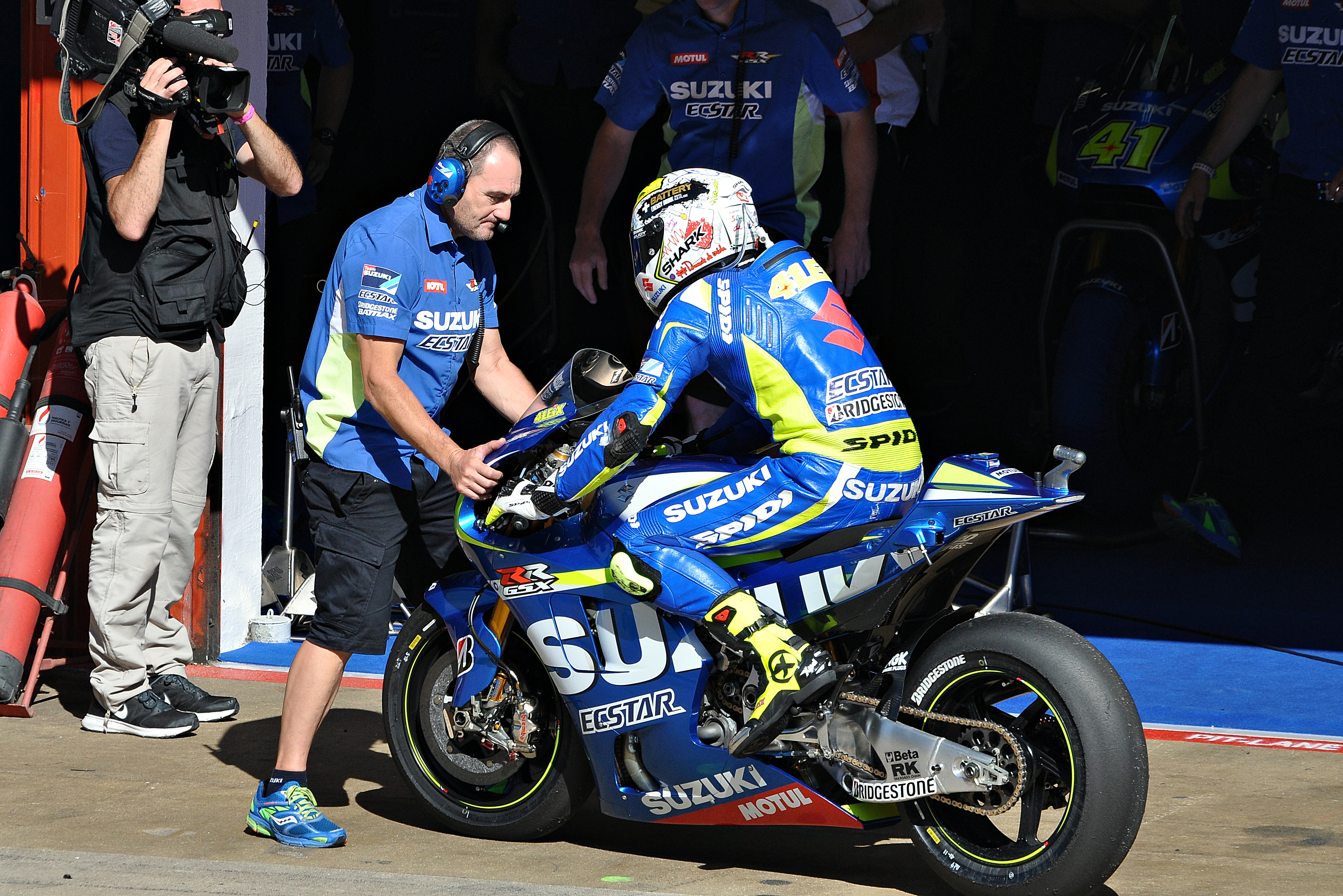
Aleix Espargaró on his Ecstar Suzuki GSX-RR during the 2015 Spanish Grand Prix.

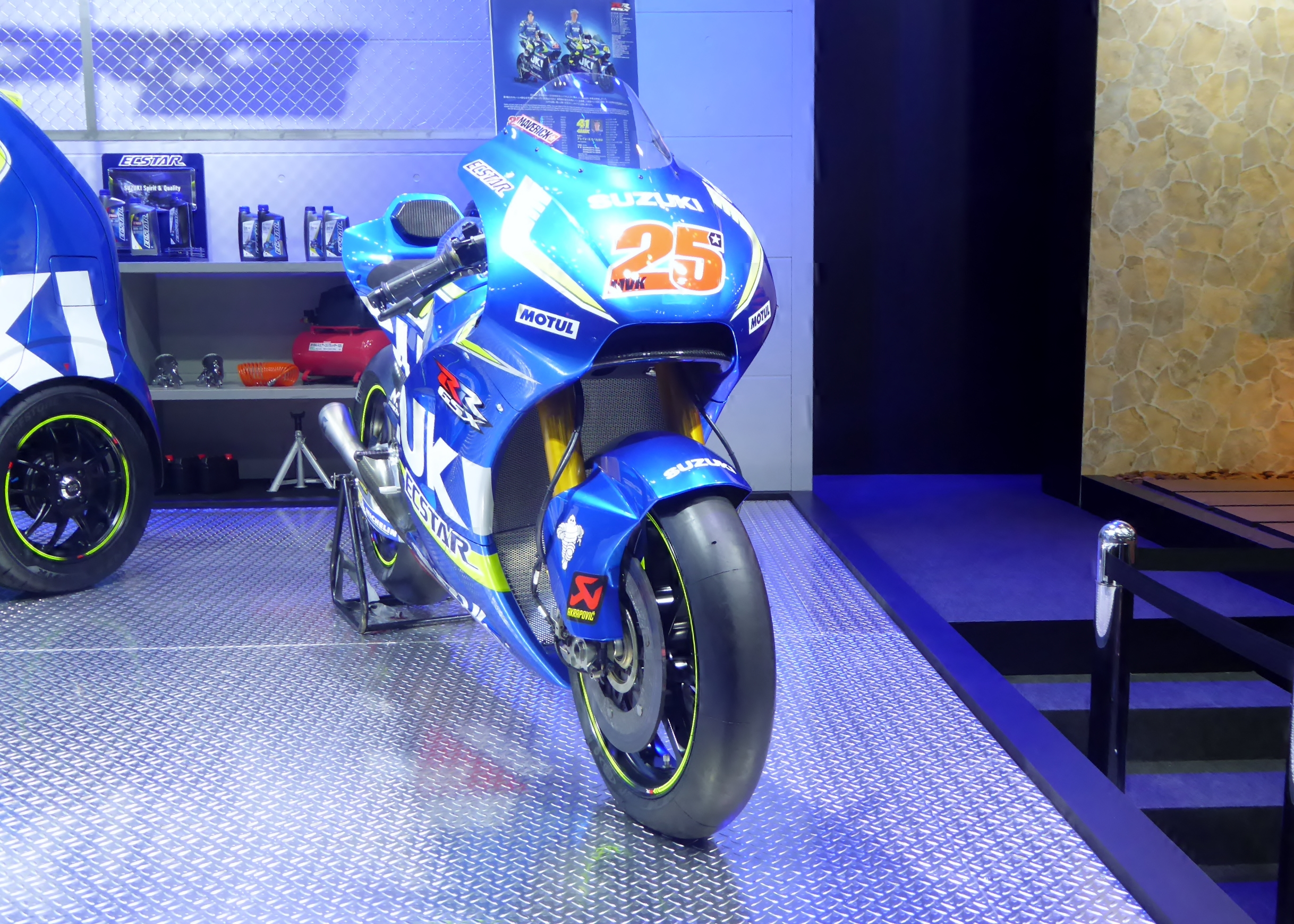
The Ecstar Suzuki GSX-RR, ridden by Maverick Viñales in the 2016 season on display.

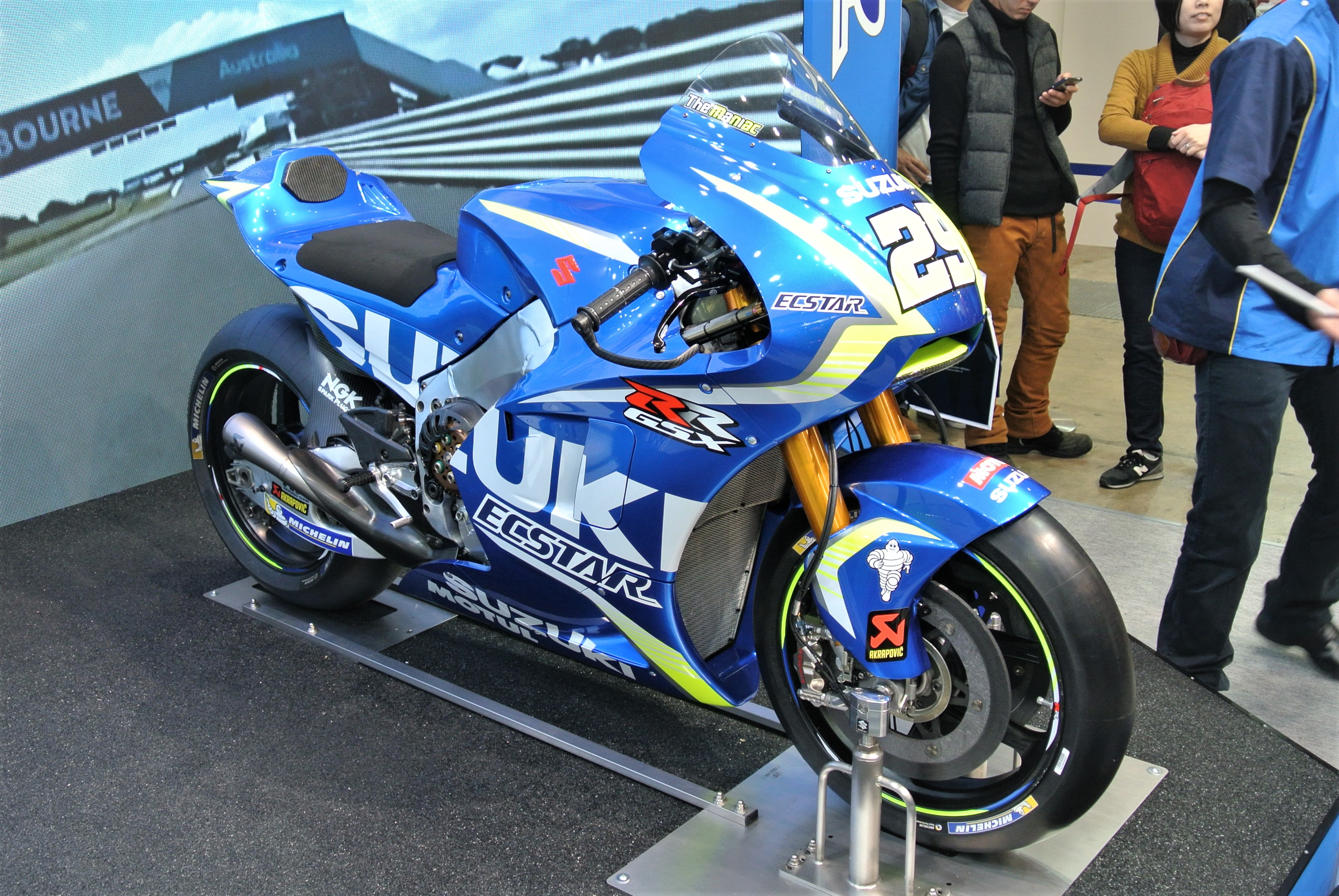
The Ecstar Suzuki GSX-RR, ridden by Andrea Iannone in the 2017 season on display.

== Team LCR ==
Team LCR is a motorcycle racing team currently competing in the MotoGP World Championship under the name LCR Honda. The team was founded in 1996 by Italian rider Lucio Cecchinello. In 2015, they were represented by British rider Cal Crutchlow on a factory-specification Honda RC213V bike, and Australian rookie Jack Miller, riding an open-specification Honda RC213V-RS. However, the team downgraded to a single bike for Crutchlow in 2016, as Miller moved to the Estrella Galicia 0,0 Marc VDS Team.

=== MotoGP ===
Year	Main colour(s)	Additional colour(s)	Main sponsor(s)	Additional major sponsor(s)	Notes
2006	White	Red, white	None	Michelin, Carrera Sunglasses, TechnologyShop, Eurobet, Denso, Iridium Power, DECA, Isoltema, Neri, Lee, RK Takasago Chain, G.P.R, PBR, NCS Rapid Inside, No Tec, Beta Tools, Container.it, Pivetti Flour, STAB Meccanica	TechnologyShop logo's removed in some rounds, replaced with the Eurobet logo for the 9th round (British Grand Prix).
2007	White	Blue	None	Michelin, Eurobet, DECA, Fassi, GIVI, Denso, Iridium Power, Lee, Container.it, Box & Box, MEC3, Flettronica Discount, RK Takasago Chain, NQC, PBR	Eurobet logo replaced with DACA logo in the 4th round (Chinese Grand Prix), Eurobet logo replaced with GIVI logo at the 11th round (U.S. Grand Prix)
2008	White	Red, black	None	Michelin, TS Vision, GIVI, Aimont, Denso, Iridium Power, DECA, Flettronica Discount, FOM Industrie, Rizoma, Prink, RK Takasago Chain, PBR, Malossi	TS Vision was the most prominent sponsor in the first half of the season, GIVI in the second half of the season.
2009	Black	White	Playboy	Bridgestone, Radio Monte Carlo, Elf, GIVI, Flettronica Discount, Aimont, Heidrum, Denso, Dinamica, Rizoma, RK Takasago Chain, Beta Tools, PBR, NCS Rapid Inside	Playboy logo's replaced with Radio Monte Carlo logo's for round 1 (Qatar Grand Prix) and round 15 (Australian Grand Prix). Playboy logo's replaced with Elf logo's for round 4 (French Grand Prix). Playboy logo's replaced with GIVI logo's for round 8 (U.S. Grand Prix) and round 16 (Malaysian Grand Prix). Playboy logo's replaced with Flettronica Discount logo's for round 13 (San Marino Grand Prix).
2010	White	Black	Playboy	Bridgestone, GIVI, Moto Expert, Rev'it!, Elf, Flettronica Discount, Dinamica, Toshiba, PokerStars.it, Aimont, TNK, RK Takasago Chain, Beta Tools, PBR, Arrow	Playboy logo's replaced with GIVI logo's for round 1 (Qatar Grand Prix), round 2 (Spanish Grand Prix), round 9 (U.S. Grand Prix), round 11 (Indianapolis Grand Prix) and round 15 (Malaysian Grand Prix). Playboy logo's replaced with Moto Expert logo's for round 3 (French Grand Prix). Playboy logo's replaced with Rev'it! logo's for round 6 (Dutch TT). Playboy logo's replaced with Elf logo's for round 7 (Catalan Grand Prix). Playboy logo's replaced with Flettronica Discount logo's for round 10 (Czech Republic Grand Prix), round 12 (San Marino Grand Prix), round 17 (Portuguese Grand Prix) and round 18 (Valencian Grand Prix). Playboy logo's removed for round 14 (Japanese Grand Prix).
2011	White	Black	Playboy	Bridgestone, GIVI, Effenbert Beer, Rizoma, Linear Assicurazioni, Dinamica, DoctorGlass, RK Takasago Chain, Beta Tools, PBR, Arrow	Playboy logo's replaced with GIVI logo's for round 1 (Qatar Grand Prix), round 3 (Portuguese Grand Prix), round 7 (Dutch TT), round 9 (German Grand Prix), round 15 (Japanese Grand Prix) and round 17 (Malaysian Grand Prix). Playboy logo's replaced with Elf logo's for round 4 (French Grand Prix). Playboy logo's replaced with Effenbert Beer logo's for round 5 (Catalan Grand Prix), round 6 (British Grand Prix) and round 16 (Australian Grand Prix). Playboy logo's replaced with a special U.S. Rizoma livery for round 10 (U.S. Grand Prix). Playboy logo's replaced with Linear Assicurazioni logo's for round 18 (Valencian Grand Prix).
2012	White, red	Green, black	GIVI	Bridgestone, Speed Week Magazine, Linear Assicurazioni, Elf, Playboy, Rizoma, Red Bull, DoctorGlass, Nifin, Dinamica, Lumberjack, RK Takasago Chain, Beta Tools, PBR, Arrow	GIVI logo's replaced with Speed Week logo's for round 2 (Spanish Grand Prix) and round 6 (British Grand Prix). GIVI logo's replaced with Linear Assicurazioni logo's for round 3 (Portuguese Grand Prix) and round 13 (San Marino Grand Prix). GIVI logo's replaced with Elf logo's for round 4 (French Grand Prix). GIVI logo's replaced with Playboy logo's for round 9 (Italian Grand Prix), round 17 (Australian Grand Prix) and round 18 (Valencia Grand Prix). GIVI logo's replaced with Rizoma logo's for round 10 (U.S. Grand Prix). GIVI logo's replaced with Red Bull logo's for round 11 (Indianapolis Grand Prix). GIVI logo's replaced with DoctorGlass logo's for round 14 (Aragón Grand Prix).
2013	White, red	Green, black	GIVI	Bridgestone, Rizoma, Linear Assicurazioni, Elf, Red Bull, La Montina, Planet Win 365, Nifin, Dinamica, Lumberjack, DoctorGlass, RK Takasago Chain, Beta Tools, PBR, Parts Europe, Arrow	GIVI logo's replaced with Rizoma logo's for round 2 (Grand Prix of the Americas). GIVI logo's replaced with Elf logo's for round 4 (French Grand Prix). GIVI logo's replaced with Linear Assicurazioni logo's for round 5 (Italian Grand Prix), round 7 (Dutch TT) and round 13 (San Marino Grand Prix). GIVI logo's replaced with Red Bull logo's for round 10 (Indianapolis Grand Prix). GIVI logo's replaced with La Montina logo's for round 12 (British Grand Prix). GIVI logo's replaced with Planet Win 365 logo's for round 14 (Aragón Grand Prix).
2014	Red	White, green, black	GIVI	Bridgestone, Rizoma, Elf, Linear Assicurazioni, Unibat, CWMWorld.com/CWMFX.com, Nifin, Dinamica, Lumberjack, DoctorGlass, RK Takasago Chain, Beta Tools, PBR, Arrow	GIVI logo's replaced with Rizoma logo's for round 2 (Grand Prix of the Americas). GIVI logo's replaced with Elf logo's for round 5 (French Grand Prix). GIVI logo's replaced with Linear Assicurazioni logo's for round 6 (Italian Grand Prix), round 13 (San Marino Grand Prix) and round 14 (Aragón Grand Prix). GIVI logo's replaced with Unibat logo's for round 7 (Catalan Grand Prix). GIVI logo's replaced with CWMWorld.com/CWMFX.com logo's for round 8 (Dutch TT), round 11 (Czech Republic Grand Prix) and round 12 (British Grand Prix).
2015	White/Red	White, green, black	CWMFX.com/GIVI	Bridgestone, Castrol, Rizoma, Unibat, Agos Ducato, Monster Energy, Caprimoto, D.I.D, Beta Tools, PBR, Arrow	CWMFX.com logo's replaced with GIVI logo's on Cal Crutchlow's bike from round 12 (British Grand Prix) onwards. GIVI livery replaced with Castrol livery for round 17 (Malaysian Grand Prix). GIVI logo's replaced with Rizoma logo's for round 18 (Valencia Grand Prix).
2016	Red	White, green, black	GIVI	Michelin, Castrol, Rizoma, Custom, Agos, Öhlins, Unibat, Caprimoto, Cinaccorpe, D.I.D, Beta Tools, PBR, Arrow	GIVI logo's replaced with Custom Phone logo's for round 6 (Italian Grand Prix). GIVI logo's replaced with Rizoma logo's for round 3 (Grand Prix of the Americas), round 7 (Catalan Grand Prix) and round 12 (British Grand Prix). GIVI logo's replaced with Castrol logo's for round 13 (San Marino Grand Prix) and round 17 (Malaysian Grand Prix).
2017	Red	White, green, black	GIVI	Michelin, Rizoma, Castrol, Custom Phone, Agos, Öhlins, Caprimoto, Cinaccorpe, D.I.D, Beta Tools, PBR, Arrow	GIVI logo's replaced with Rizoma logo's for round 3 (Grand Prix of the Americas), round 7 (Catalan Grand Prix) and round 18 (Valencian Grand Prix). GIVI logo's replaced with Castrol logo's for round 12 (British Grand Prix) and round 17 (Malaysian Grand Prix). GIVI logo's replaced with Custom Phone logo's for round 13 (San Marino Grand Prix).
2018	Red/red, white	White, green, black/black	GIVI/Idemitsu Kosan	Michelin, Rizoma, Castrol, Agos, Öhlins, Caprimoto, Cinaccorpe, D.I.D, Beta Tools, PBR, Arrow	GIVI logo's replaced with Rizoma logo's for round 3 (Grand Prix of the Americas). GIVI logo's replaced with Flex-Box logo's for round 10 (Grand Prix České republiky).

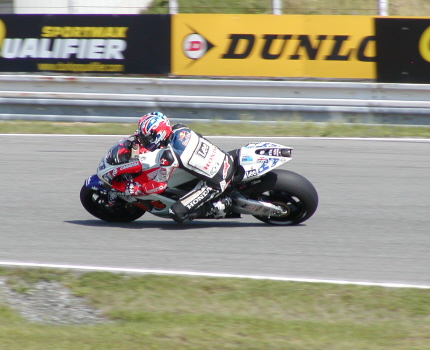
Casey Stoner riding his LCR Honda at the 2006 Czech Grand Prix.

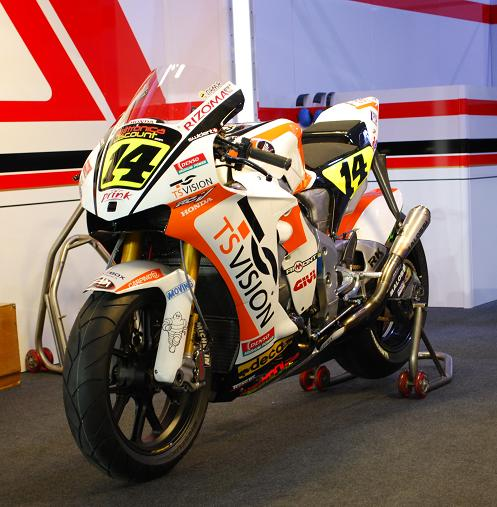
The Honda LCR, ridden by Randy de Puniet in the 2008 season on display.

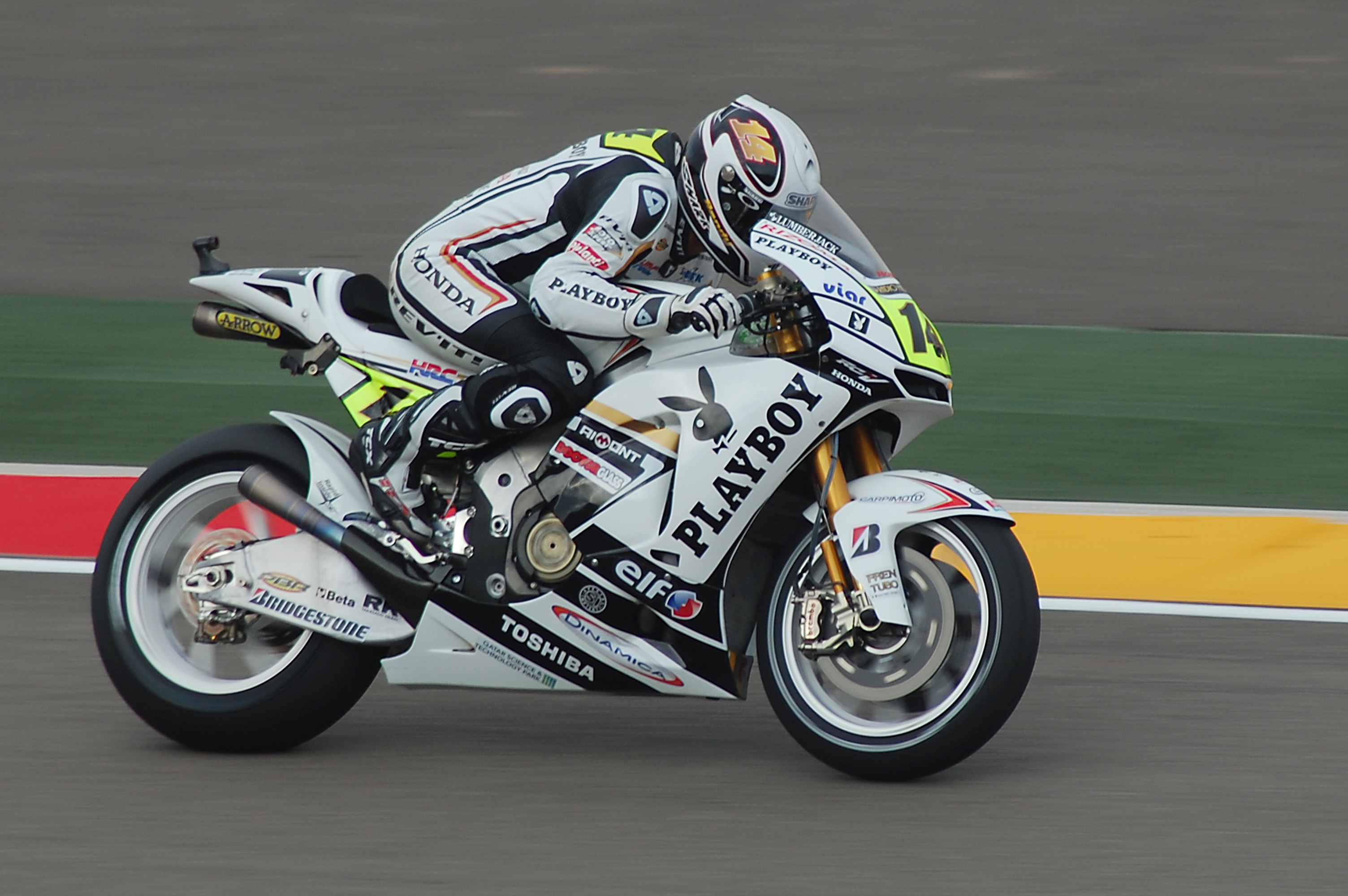
Randy de Puniet riding theLCR Honda at the 2010 Aragón Grand Prix.

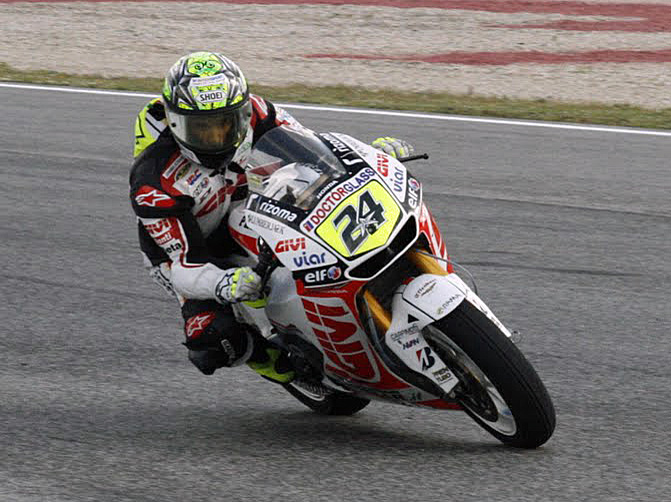
Toni Elías riding his Honda LCR at the 2011 Portuguese Grand Prix.

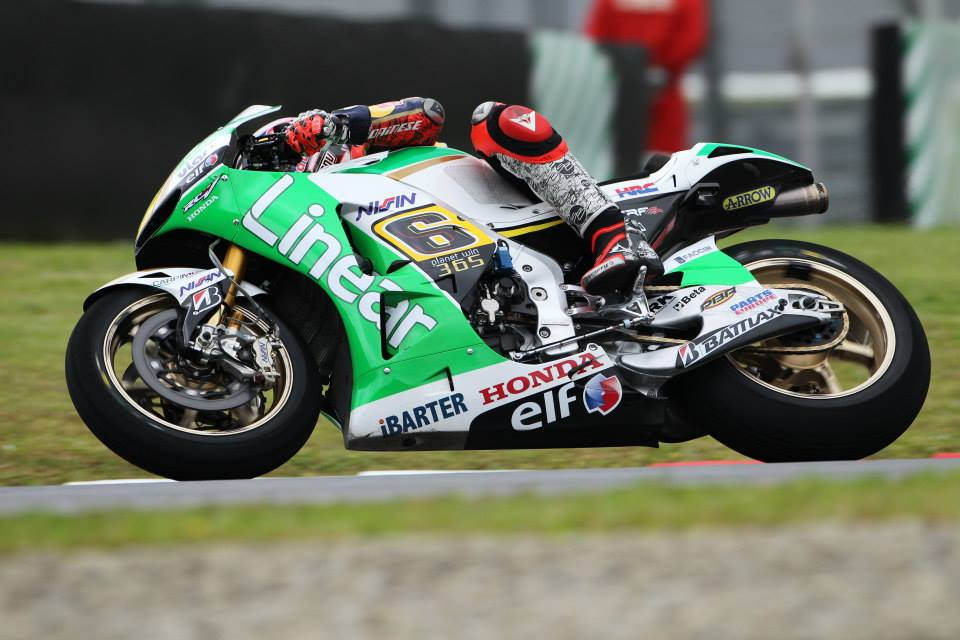
Stefan Bradl riding the LCR Honda at the 2013 Italian Grand Prix. Note the Linear Assicurazioni livery used.

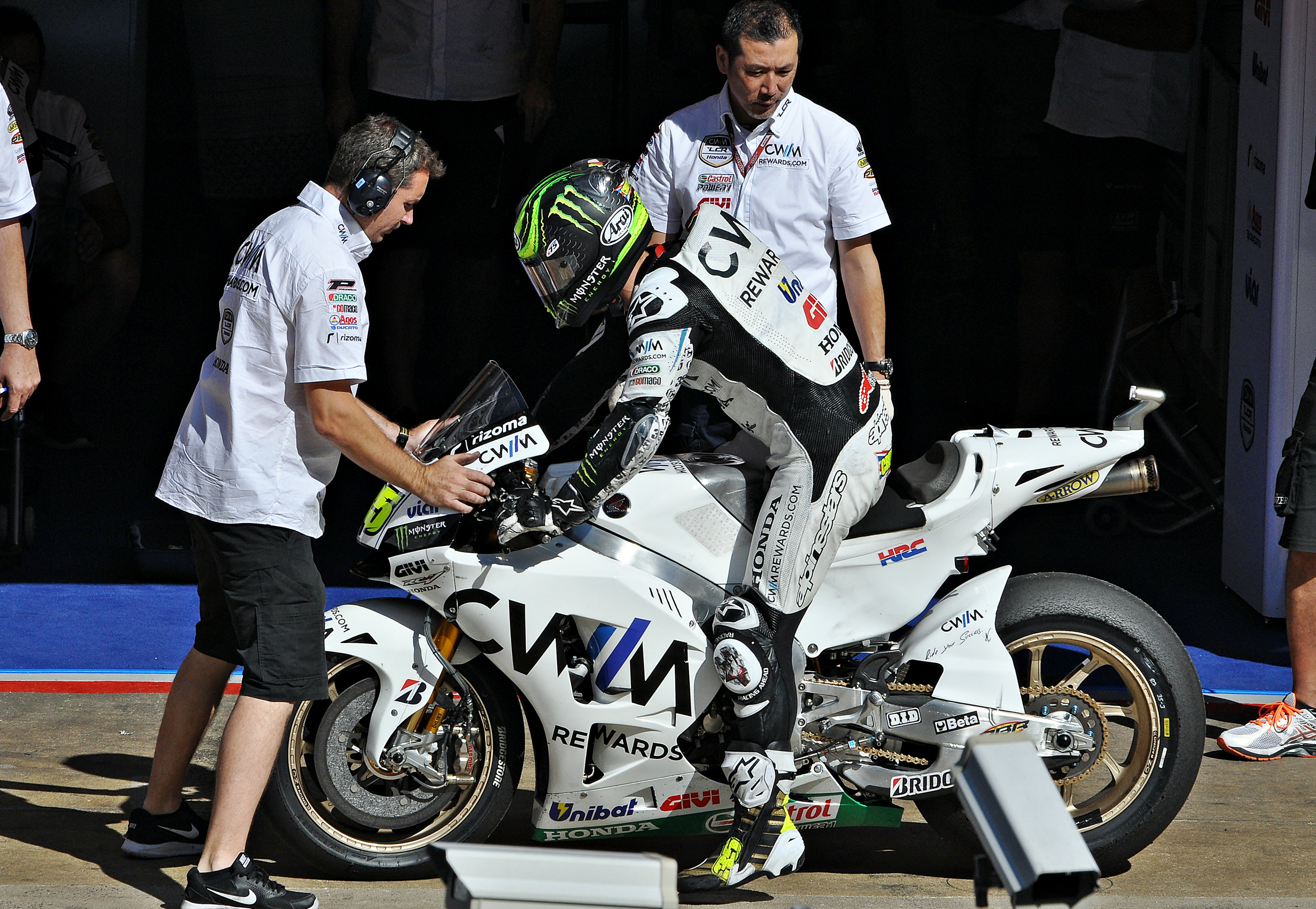
Cal Crutchlow on his LCR Honda at the 2015 Catalan Grand Prix.

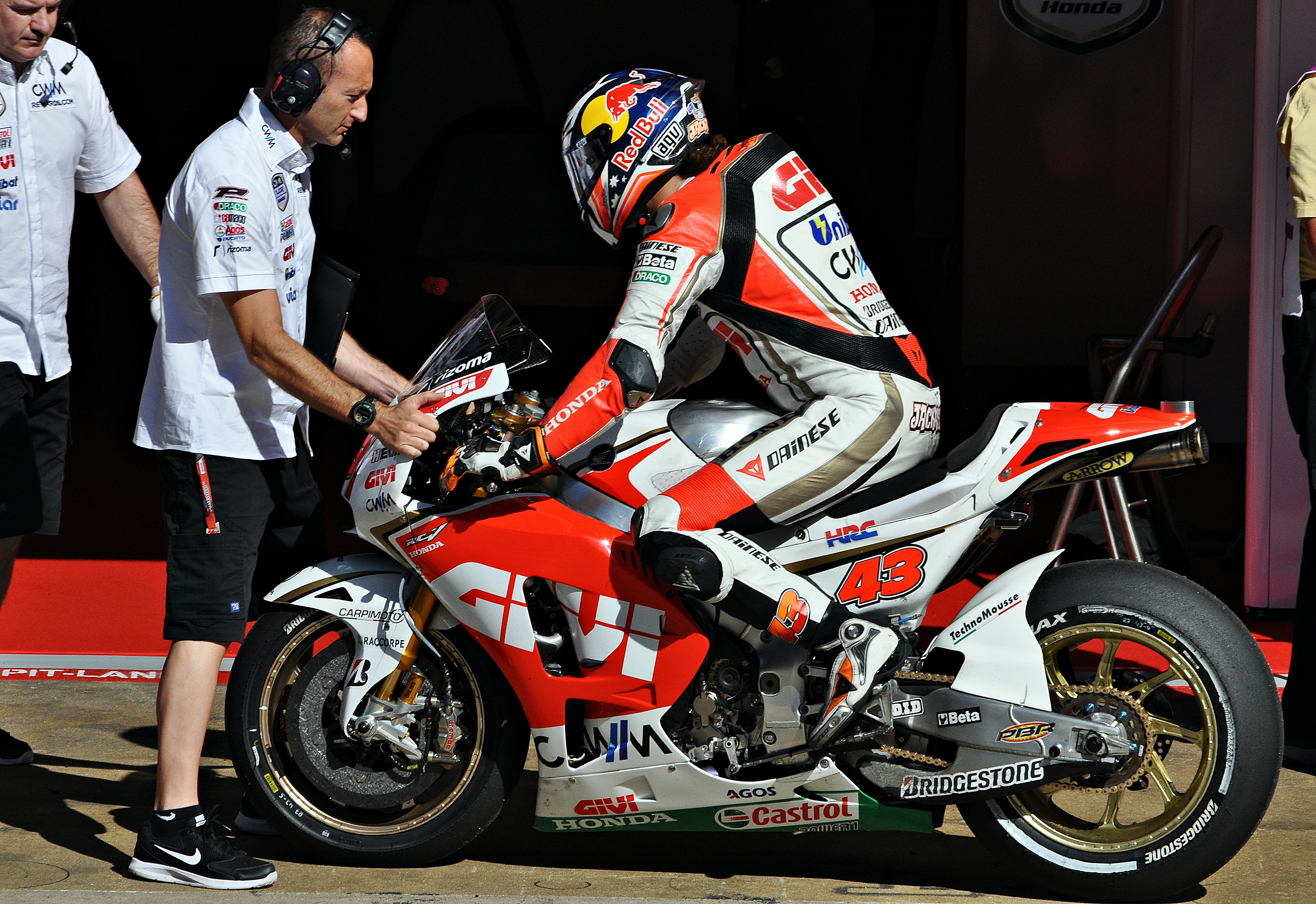
Jack Miller on his LCR Honda at the 2015 Catalan Grand Prix.

== Tech 3 ==
Tech 3 is a motorcycle racing team currently competing in the MotoGP World Championship under the name Monster Yamaha Tech 3 and in the Moto2 World Championship under the name Tech 3 Moto2.

Tech 3 functions as a junior team to the Movistar Yamaha MotoGP Team, with the aim of developing the skills of promising riders for the senior team. The team was founded by ex-racer Hervé Poncharal, engineer Guy Coulon and Bernard Martignac and started racing in 1990 in the 250 cc class, using Honda and Suzuki motorcycles. In 1999, the team partnered with Yamaha for the factory team and in 2000 their riders, Olivier Jacque and Shinya Nakano, placed first and second in the 250 world championship. In 2001 the team moved the whole operation to the premier class, again with Yamaha, Jacque and Nakano on the YZR500,"MotoGP – Tech 3 Yamaha". though their status changed to that of satellite team through to the present.

Towards the end of the 2002 season, the team was given use of the YZR-M1. In 2006 and 2007 the team used Dunlop tyres, but returned to Michelin in 2008. In the 2008 Grand Prix motorcycle racing season, the two-time and reigning Superbike World Champion James Toseland partnered with the two-time Superbike World Champion Colin Edwards. For 2010, Ben Spies replaced Toseland. Spies finished the season in sixth place while Edwards finished in eleventh place. In the new Moto2 category, Tech 3 rider Yuki Takahashi finished the season in twelfth place while Raffaele De Rosa finished 27th, aboard Honda-powered bikes using a Tech 3 chassis.

For 2011, Spies moved to the factory Yamaha team, and was being replaced by Cal Crutchlow; the team again retained Colin Edwards for a fourth season. For 2012, Crutchlow moves into the second year of his two-year deal, while Edwards announced that he was leaving for the Forward Racing team with Andrea Dovizioso having been confirmed as his replacement. Bradley Smith signed a deal to ride for the team in MotoGP in 2013 and 2014.

=== 500cc/MotoGP ===
Year	Main colour(s)	Additional colour(s)	Main sponsor(s)	Additional major sponsor(s)	Notes
2001	Dark blue	White	Gauloises	Michelin, Kavaba, NEC, Elf Aquitaine, PlayStation, D.I.D, AFAM, Brembo, NGK	Gauloises logo's replaced with "GO ! ! ! ! ! ! !" in countries where tobacco sponsorship is forbidden.
2002	Dark blue	White	Gauloises	Michelin, Kavaba, NEC, Elf Aquitaine, PlayStation 2, 2D, D.I.D, AFAM, Brembo, NGK	Gauloises logos replaced with "GO ! ! ! ! ! ! !" in countries where tobacco sponsorship is forbidden.
2003	Dark blue	White	Gauloises	Michelin, NEC, Motul, 2D, D.I.D, AFAM, Brembo, NGK	Gauloises logos replaced with "GO ! ! ! ! ! ! !" in countries where tobacco sponsorship is forbidden.
2004	Red, silver (Marco Melandri)/Dark blue (Norifumi Abe)	White	Fortuna (Marco Melandri)/Gauloises (Norifumi Abe)	Michelin, NEC, Motul, 2D, D.I.D, AFAM, Brembo, NGK	Fortuna names and logos replaced with "Spain's N°1" logos/Gauloises names replaced with "GO ! ! ! ! ! ! !" logos in countries where tobacco sponsorship is forbidden.
2005	Red, yellow	Grey	Fortuna	Michelin, NEC, Motul, 2D, D.I.D, Magneti Marelli, NGK, Brembo	Fortuna logos replaced with "Spain's N°1" in countries where tobacco sponsorship is forbidden.
2006	Yellow	Black	None	Dunlop, Motul, 2D, D.I.D, Magneti Marelli, NGK, Brembo	
2007	Yellow	Black	Dunlop	Wudy AIA, AMV, Motul, 2D, D.I.D, Magneti Marelli, NGK, Brembo	
2008	Blue, yellow	Black	None	Michelin, Polini, Wudy AIA, Motul, 2D, D.I.D, Magneti Marelli, NGK, Brembo	
2009	Black	Yellow, white	Monster Energy	Bridgestone, DeWalt, Polini, NEC, Shilton, Antonio Lupi, Moto 85, Motul, Beta Tools, D.I.D, 2D, NGK, Magneti Marelli, Brembo	
2010	Black	Yellow, white	Monster Energy	Bridgestone, DeWalt, LeoVince, Shilton, Antonio Lupi, Moto 85, Motul, Beta Tools, D.I.D, 2D, NGK, Magneti Marelli, Brembo	
2011	Black	Yellow	Monster Energy	Bridgestone, LeoVince, DeWalt, Antonio Lupi, Stanley, Motul, Shilton, FACOM, LighTech, D.I.D, 2D, NGK, Magneti Marelli, Brembo	
2012	Black	Yellow	Monster Energy	Bridgestone, LeoVince, Stanley, DeWalt, Motul, Shilton, FACOM, LighTech, D.I.D, 2D, NGK, Magneti Marelli, Brembo	
2013	Black	Yellow	Monster Energy	Bridgestone, Antonio Lupi, Stanley, DeWalt, Motul, Shilton, FACOM, LighTech, D.I.D, 2D, NGK, Magneti Marelli, Brembo	
2014	Black	Yellow, green	Monster Energy	Bridgestone, Antonio Lupi, Stanley, Motul, DeWalt, Bihr, Shilton, FACOM, LighTech, D.I.D, 2D, NGK, Magneti Marelli, Brembo	
2015	Black	Yellow, green	Monster Energy	Bridgestone, Reale, Stanley, Motul, DeWalt, Bihr, Shilton, FACOM, LighTech, Semakin Di Depan, D.I.D, 2D, NGK, Magneti Marelli, Brembo, Akrapovič	
2016	Black	Yellow, green	Monster Energy	Michelin, Reale, Stanley, Motul, DeWalt, Bihr, Shilton, Mac Tools, LighTech, Semakin Di Depan, D.I.D, 2D, NGK, Magneti Marelli, RK Takasago Chain, Brembo, Akrapovič	
2017	Black	Red, yellow, green	Monster Energy	Michelin, Barracuda Motors, Bihr, DeWalt, Stanley, Motul, Shilton, Sakura, FACOM, RK Takasago Chain, Semakin Di Depan, D.I.D, 2D, NGK, Magneti Marelli, Brembo	
2018	Black	Red, yellow, green	Monster Energy	Michelin, Barracuda Motors, DeWalt, Stanley, Motul, Shilton, Sakura, FACOM, RK Takasago Chain, Semakin Di Depan, D.I.D, 2D, NGK, Magneti Marelli, Brembo	

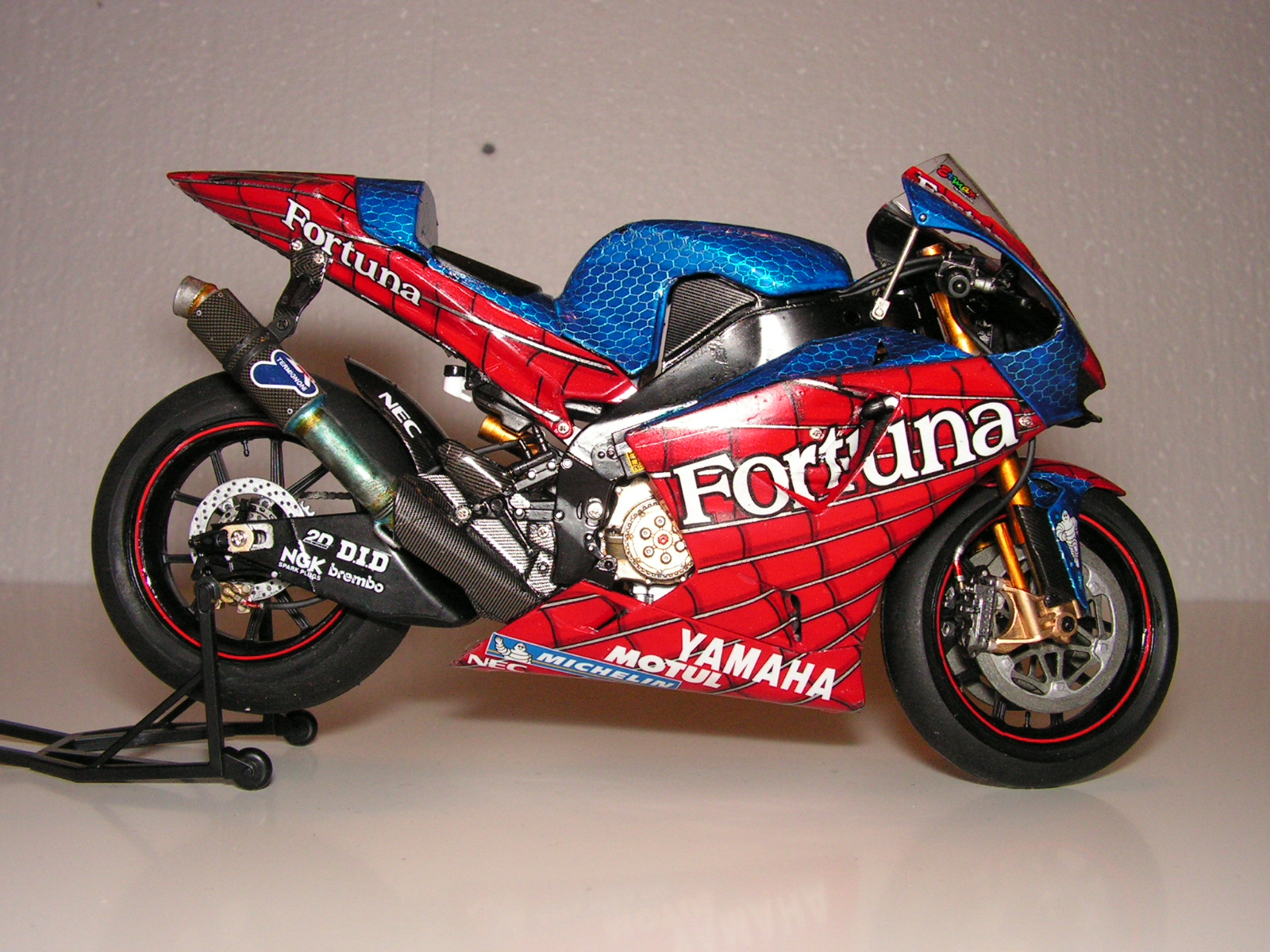
The Fortuna Yamaha Tech 3, ridden by Marco Melandri in the 2004 season on display.

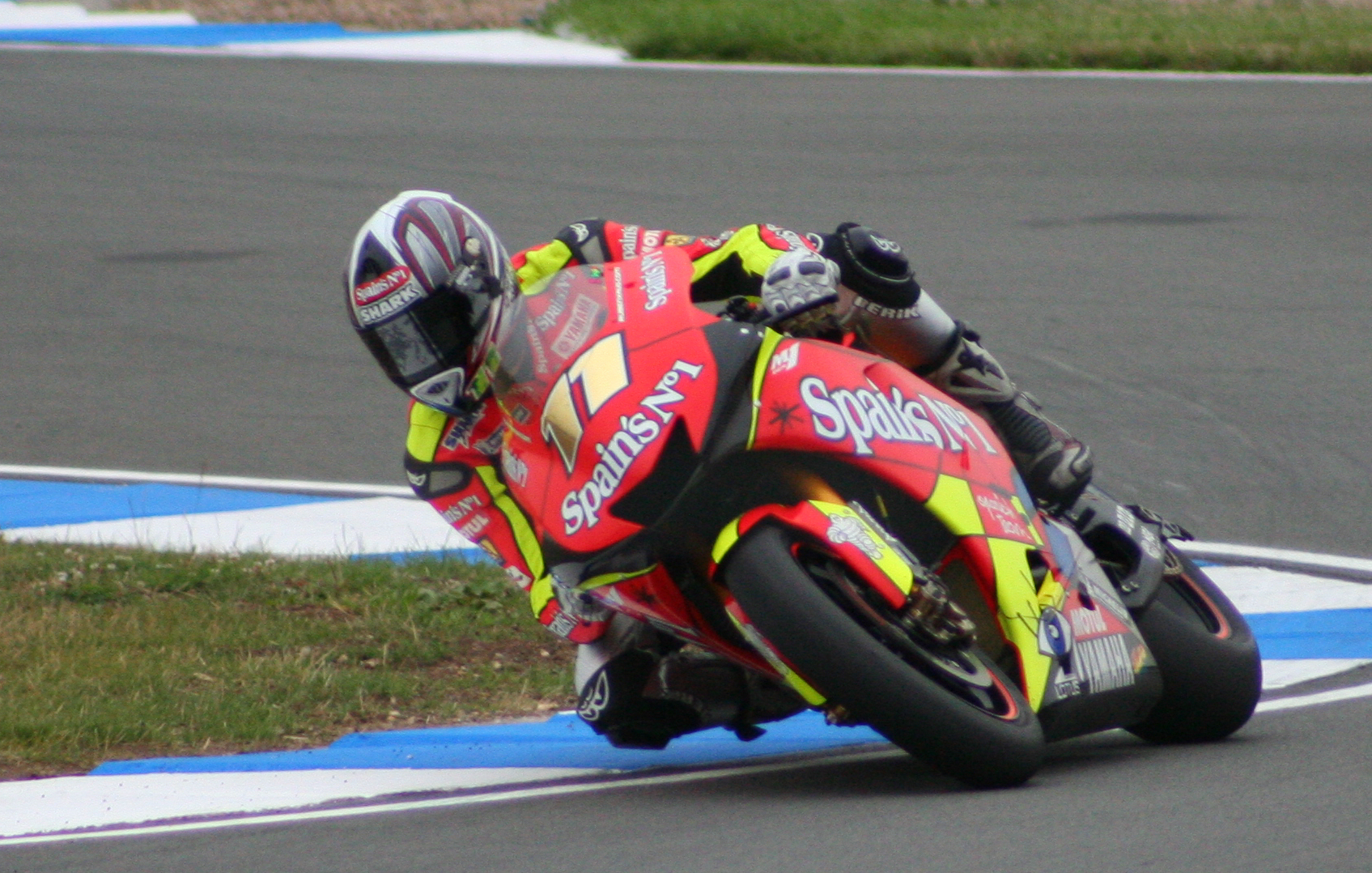
Rubén Xaus, riding the Fortuna Yamaha Tech 3 at the 2005 British Grand Prix. Notice the replacement of the "Fortuna" logo's.

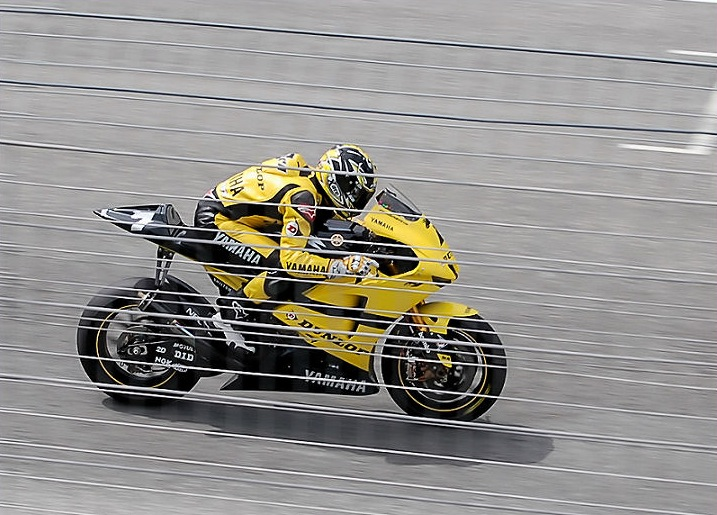
Carlos Checa, riding the 2006 Yamaha Tech 3.

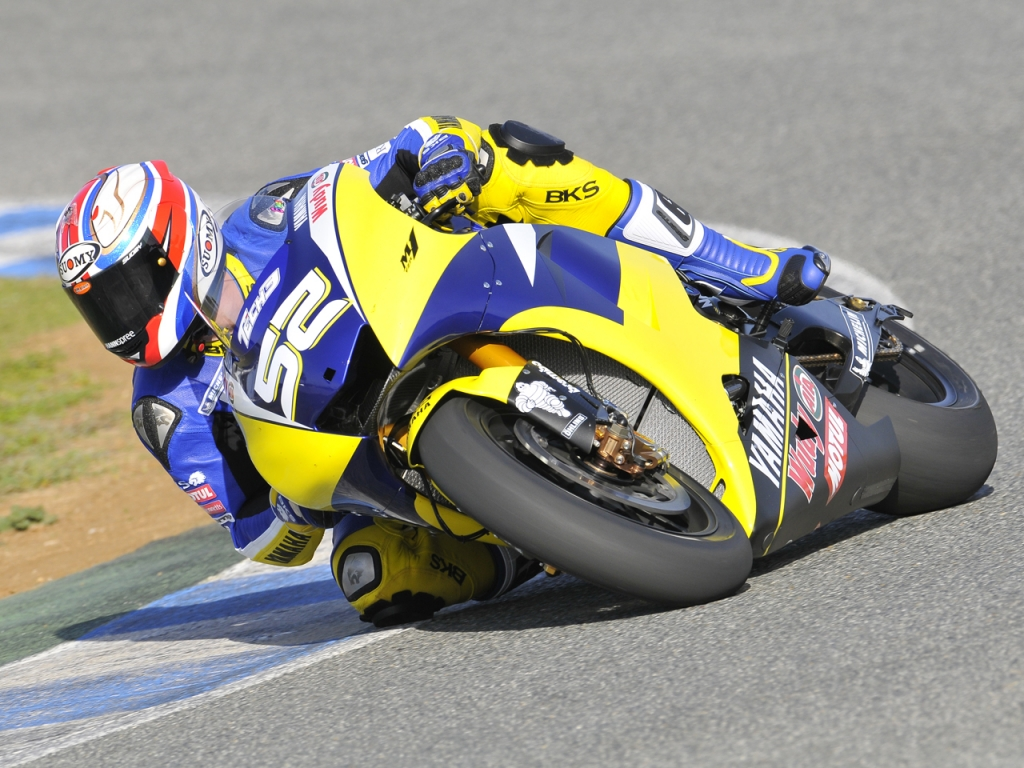
James Toseland, riding the Yamaha Tech 3 at the 2008 tests in Jerez, Spain.

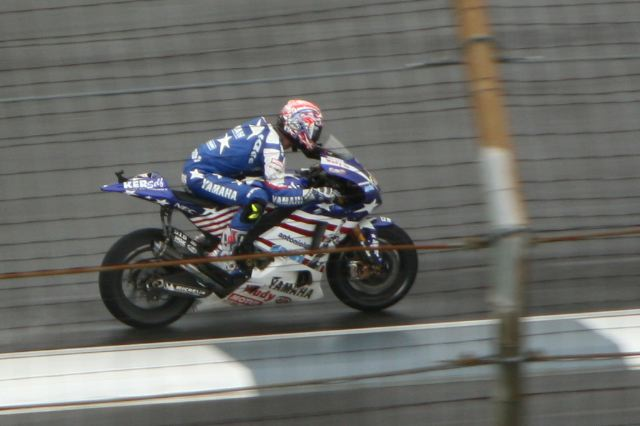
Colin Edwards, riding a "USA" liveried Yamaha Tech 3 at the 2008 Indianapolis Grand Prix.

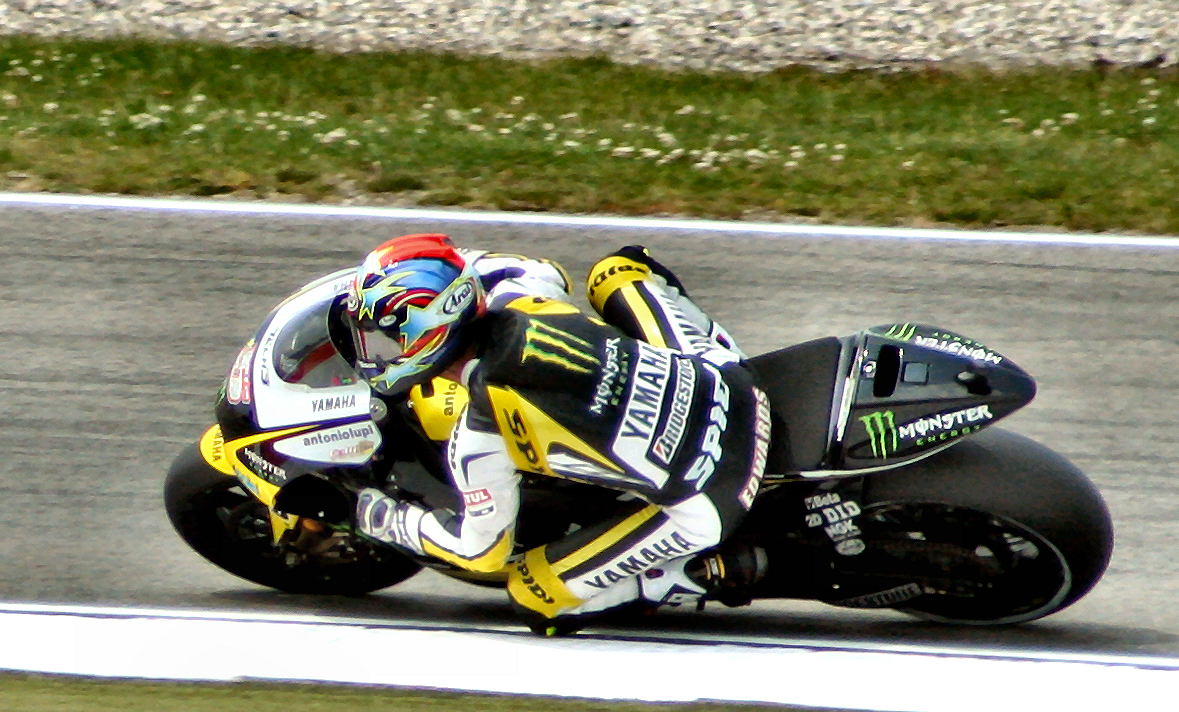
Colin Edwards, riding the Monster Yamaha Tech 3 at the 2009 Dutch TT in Assen.

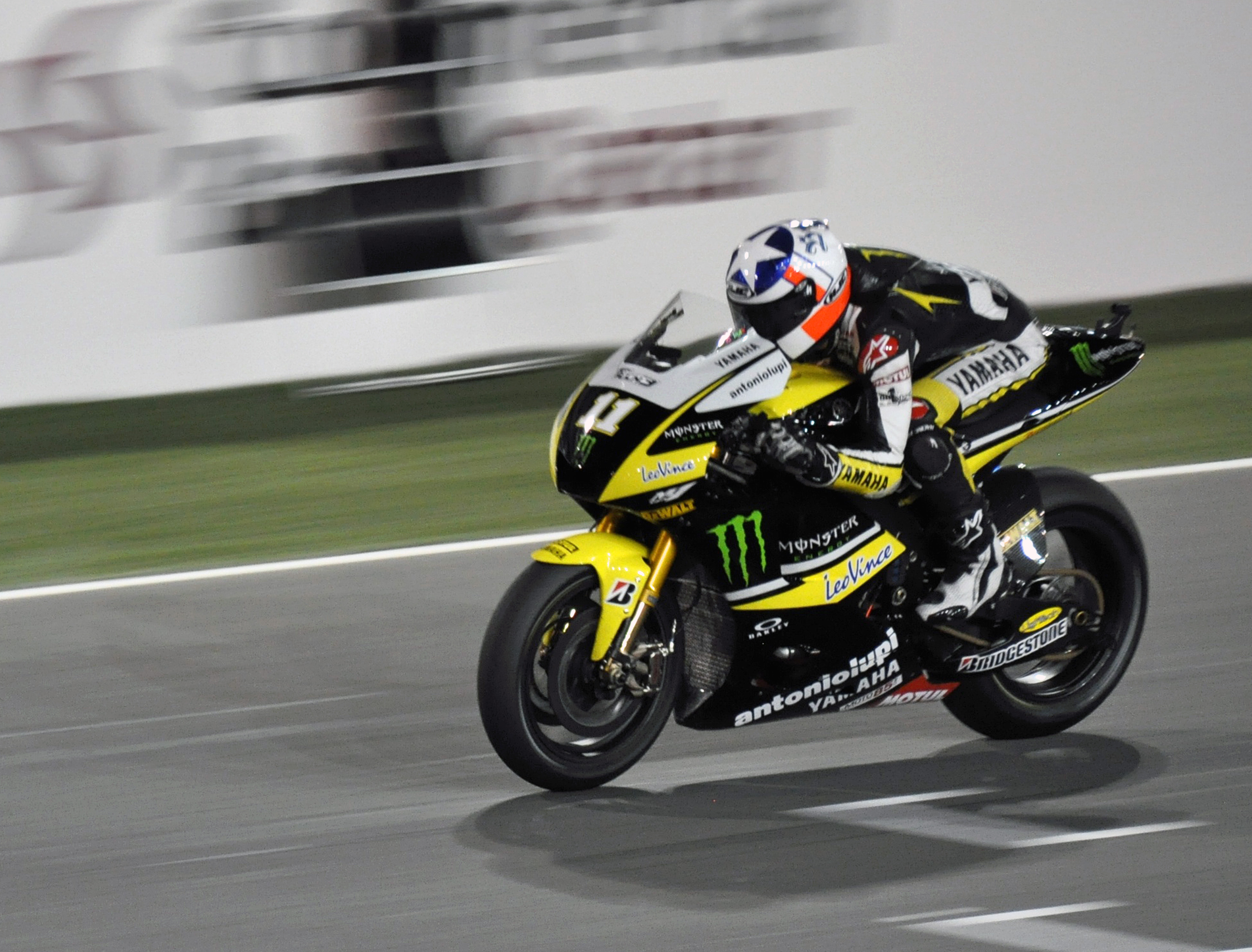
Ben Spies, riding the Monster Yamaha Tech 3 at the 2010 Qatar Grand Prix.

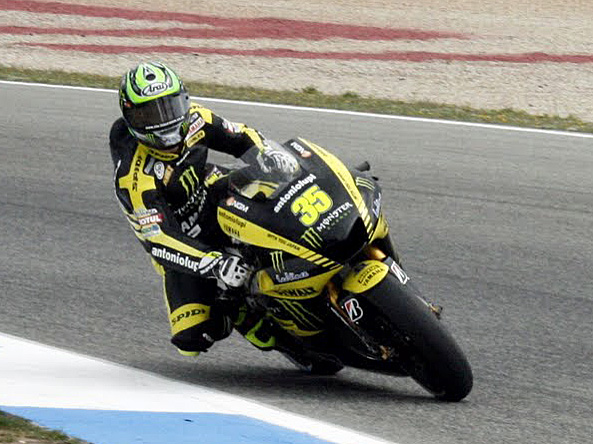
Cal Crutchlow, riding the Monster Yamaha Tech 3 at the 2011 Portuguese Grand Prix.

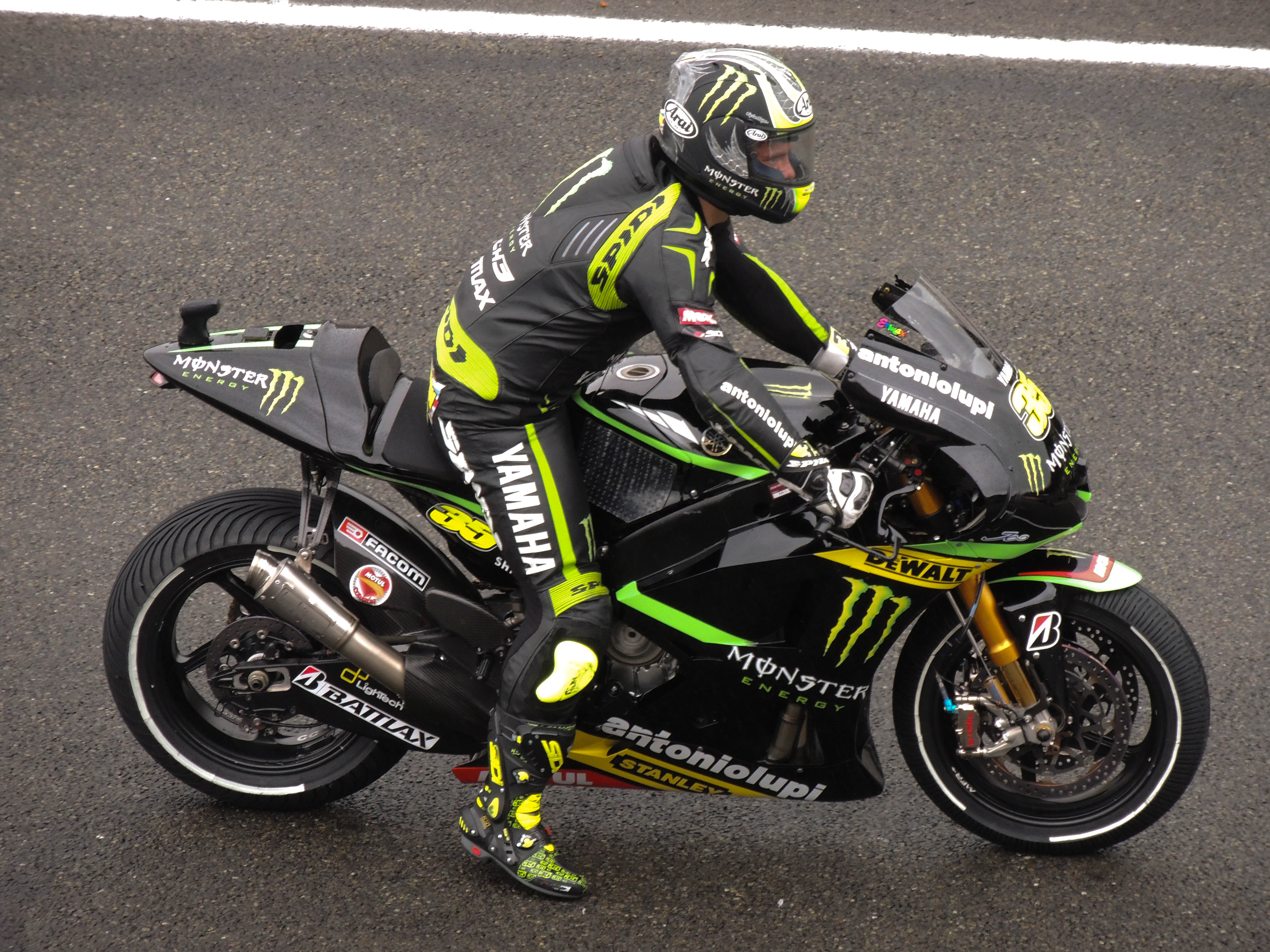
Cal Crutchlow on his Monster Yamaha Tech 3 at the 2013 French Grand Prix.

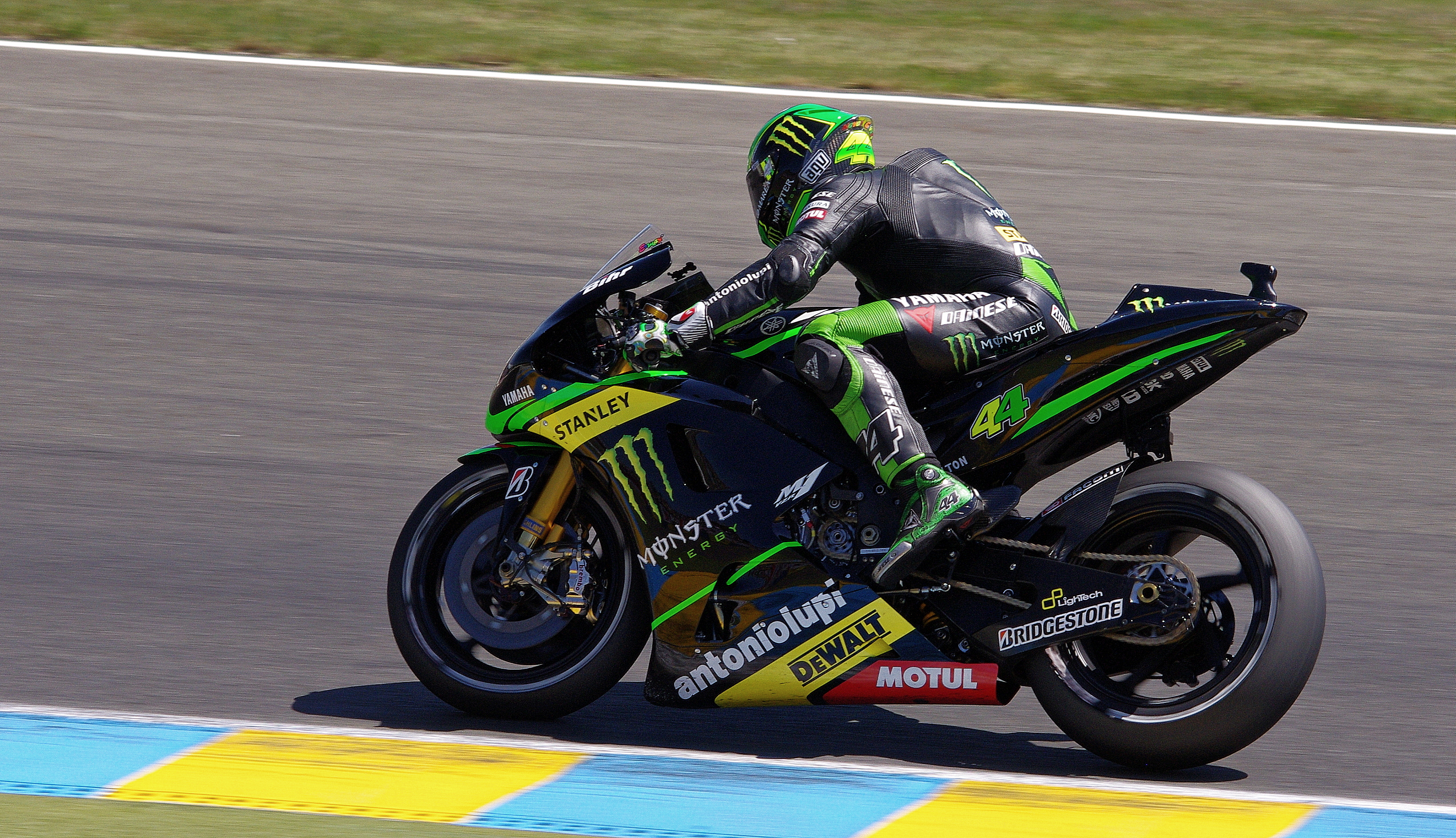
Pol Espargaró, riding the Monster Yamaha Tech 3 at the 2014 French Grand Prix.

== VR46 MotoGP ==
The SKY Racing Team VR46 is a motorcycle racing team owned by Valentino Rossi and based in Tavullia (Marche, Italy). The team enters Grand Prix motorcycle racing in the Moto2 category with Kalex chassis and previously in Moto3 category with KTM RC250GP motorcycles. The team manager is the former road racer Pablo Nieto. The team has collected 24 wins (9 in Moto3 and 15 in Moto2) and one riders' championship (with Bagnaia in 2018). Expanded to MotoGP in 2021 with Esponsorama Racing.

Year	Main colour(s)	Additional colour(s)	Main Sponsor	Additional major sponsor(s)	Notes
2021	Black	Blue, yellow	Sky Italia	Michelin, Motul, NGK, RK Takasago Chain, Avintia, With U, Monster Energy, Bardahl	

== Yamaha Motor Racing ==
Yamaha Motor Racing or Yamaha Factory Racing is the official Italian-Japanese factory team of Yamaha in MotoGP.

In motorcycle racing Yamaha has won 39 world championships, including 6 in MotoGP and 9 in the preceding 500 cc two-stroke class, and 1 in World Superbike. In addition Yamaha have recorded 208 victories at the Isle of Man TT and head the list of victories at the Sidecar TT with 40. Past Yamaha riders include: Giacomo Agostini, Bob Hannah, Heikki Mikkola, Kenny Roberts, Eddie Lawson, Wayne Rainey, Jeremy McGrath, Stefan Merriman, Dave Molyneux, Ian Hutchinson, Phil Read, Chad Reed, Ben Spies, and Jorge Lorenzo. Their current lineup consists of 9 time champion Valentino Rossi and Maverick Viñales.

=== 500cc/MotoGP ===
Year	Main colour(s)	Additional colour(s)	Main sponsor(s)	Additional major sponsor(s)	Notes
1974	White	Red, Black	None	Champion, Goodyear, Castrol	
1978	Yellow	White, Black	None	Champion, Bell Helmets, Lectron Carburettors, Goodyear	
1980	Yellow	White, Black	None	Bel-Ray, Champion, Goodyear	
1982 - 1983	Red, white	Yellow	Marlboro	Brembo, Regina Chain, Dunlop, Öhlins	Marlboro names (not the Marlboro logos) removed in countries where tobacco sponsorship is forbidden.
1984	Red, white	Yellow	Marlboro	Brembo, Regina Chain, Dunlop, Öhlins	Marlboro names (not the Marlboro logos) removed in countries where tobacco sponsorship is forbidden.
1992	Red, white	Black	Marlboro	Michelin, Castrol, Öhlins, Regina Chain	Marlboro names (not the Marlboro logos) removed in countries where tobacco sponsorship is forbidden.
1993	Red, white	Black	Marlboro	Dunlop, Castrol, Öhlins, Regina Chain, Brembo	Marlboro names (not the Marlboro logos) removed in countries where tobacco sponsorship is forbidden.
1994	Red, white	Black	Marlboro	Dunlop, Castrol, Öhlins, Regina Chain, Brembo	Marlboro names (not the Marlboro logos) replaced with a striped variant or removed in countries where tobacco sponsorship is forbidden.
1995	Red, white	Black	Marlboro	Dunlop, Castrol, NGK, Öhlins, Regina Chain, Brembo	Marlboro names (not the Marlboro logos) removed in countries where tobacco sponsorship is forbidden.
1996	Red, white	Black	Marlboro	Michelin, Castrol, NGK, Öhlins, Regina Chain, Brembo	Marlboro names (not the Marlboro logos) removed in countries where tobacco sponsorship is forbidden.
1997	Dark red, white	Black	None	Michelin, Castrol, NGK, Öhlins, Regina Chain, Brembo	
1998	Dark red, white	Black	None	Michelin, Castrol, NGK, Öhlins, Regina Chain, Brembo	
1999	Red, white	Black	Marlboro	Michelin, Q8 Oils, Pepe Jeans, D.I.D, Brembo, NGK, Öhlins, 2D	Marlboro names replaced with a striped variant or removed, logo replaced with a linear pattern in countries where tobacco sponsorship is forbidden.
2000	Red, white	Black	Marlboro	Michelin, Q8 Oils, D.I.D, Brembo, NGK, Öhlins, 2D	Marlboro names replaced with a striped variant or removed, logo replaced with a linear pattern in countries where tobacco sponsorship is forbidden.
2001	Red	White, black	Marlboro	Michelin, Motul, D.I.D, Brembo, NGK, Öhlins	Marlboro names and logos replaced with a white square in countries where tobacco sponsorship is forbidden.
2002	Red	White, black	Marlboro	Michelin, Motul, D.I.D, Brembo, NGK, Öhlins, Termignoni	Marlboro names and logos replaced with a white square or removed in countries where tobacco sponsorship is forbidden.
2003	Silver	Red, white, black	Fortuna	Michelin, Motul, AFAM, Brembo, NGK, Öhlins, 2D, Magneti Marelli, Termignoni	Fortuna names replaced with "Spain's N°1" logos in countries where tobacco sponsorship is forbidden.
2004	Dark blue (Valentino Rossi); Red (Carlos Checa)	White (Valentino Rossi); Silver, white (Carlos Checa)	Gauloises (Valentino Rossi); Fortuna (Carlos Checa)	Michelin, Motul, Magneti Marelli, D.I.D, NGK, 2D, Brembo, Öhlins, Termignoni	Gauloises and Fortuna replaced with "GO ! ! ! ! ! ! !" and "Spain's N°1" respectively in countries where tobacco sponsorship is forbidden.
2005	Dark blue	White	Gauloises	Michelin, Motul, D.I.D, NGK, 2D, Beta Tools, Termignoni, Brembo	Gauloises names replaced with "GO ! ! ! ! ! ! !" and Gauloises logos removed in countries where tobacco sponsorship is forbidden.
2006	Yellow, dark blue	White, black	Camel	Michelin, Motul, Magneti Marelli, D.I.D, NGK, 2D, Beta Tools, Termignoni, Brembo	Camel names replaced with "Team" and Camel logos replaced with a motorcycle in countries where tobacco sponsorship is forbidden.
2007	White	Blue	FIAT	Michelin, Wudy AIA, Motul, FastWeb, ACER, D.I.D, NGK, 2D, Beta Tools, Termignoni, Brembo	Normal livery replaced with a special "Fiat 500" variant (2007 Dutch TT). Normal livery replaced with a special "Abarth" variant (2007 Australian Grand Prix).
2008	White	Blue	FIAT	Bridgestone/Michelin, Wudy AIA, Yamalube, FastWeb, ACER, D.I.D, NGK, 2D, Beta Tools, Termignoni, Brembo	
2009	White	Blue	FIAT	Bridgestone, Petronas, Yamalube, FastWeb, Packard Bell, D.I.D, NGK, 2D, Beta Tools, Brembo, Termignoni	
2010	White	Blue	FIAT	Bridgestone, Petronas, Yamalube, FastWeb, Packard Bell, Semakin Di Depan, D.I.D, NGK, 2D, Beta Tools, Brembo, Termignoni	
2011	Dark blue, black	White	None	Bridgestone, Petronas, Yamalube, Semakin Di Depan, Iveco, D.I.D, NGK, 2D, Beta Tools, Brembo, Akrapovič	
2012	Blue, white	Black	None	Bridgestone, ENEOS, Semakin Di Depan, Yamalube, Pizzoli, D.I.D, NGK, 2D, Beta Tools, Brembo, Akrapovič	
2013	Blue, white	Black	None	Bridgestone, Monster Energy, ENEOS, Semakin Di Depan, Yamalube, Iveco, )BM(, D.I.D, NGK, 2D, Beta Tools, Brembo, Akrapovič	
2014	Blue, white	Black	Movistar	Bridgestone, Monster Energy, Yamalube, ENEOS, Semakin Di Depan, FIAT, Eurasian Bank, D.I.D, NGK, 2D, Beta Tools, Brembo, Akrapovič	
2015	Blue	White, black	Movistar	Bridgestone, Monster Energy, Eurasian Bank, Yamalube, ENEOS, Semakin Di Depan, Abarth, D.I.D, NGK, Magneti Marelli, 2D, Beta Tools, Brembo, Akrapovič	
2016	Blue	Black, white	Movistar	Michelin, Monster Energy, Eurasian Bank, ENEOS, Yamalube, Abarth, D.I.D, NGK, Magneti Marelli, 2D, Beta Tools, RCB, Brembo, Akrapovič	
2017	Blue	Black	Movistar	Michelin, Monster Energy, ENEOS, Yamalube, Abarth, D.I.D, NGK, Magneti Marelli, 2D, Beta Tools, RCB, Brembo, Akrapovič	
2018	Blue	Black	Movistar	Michelin, Monster Energy, ENEOS, Yamalube, Abarth, D.I.D, NGK, Magneti Marelli, 2D, Beta Tools, RCB, Brembo, Akrapovič	
2021	Black	Blue	Monster Energy	Michelin, Blue core, ENEOS, Yamalube, Abarth, D.I.D, NGK, Magneti Marelli, 2D, Beta Tools, RCB, Brembo, Akrapovič	

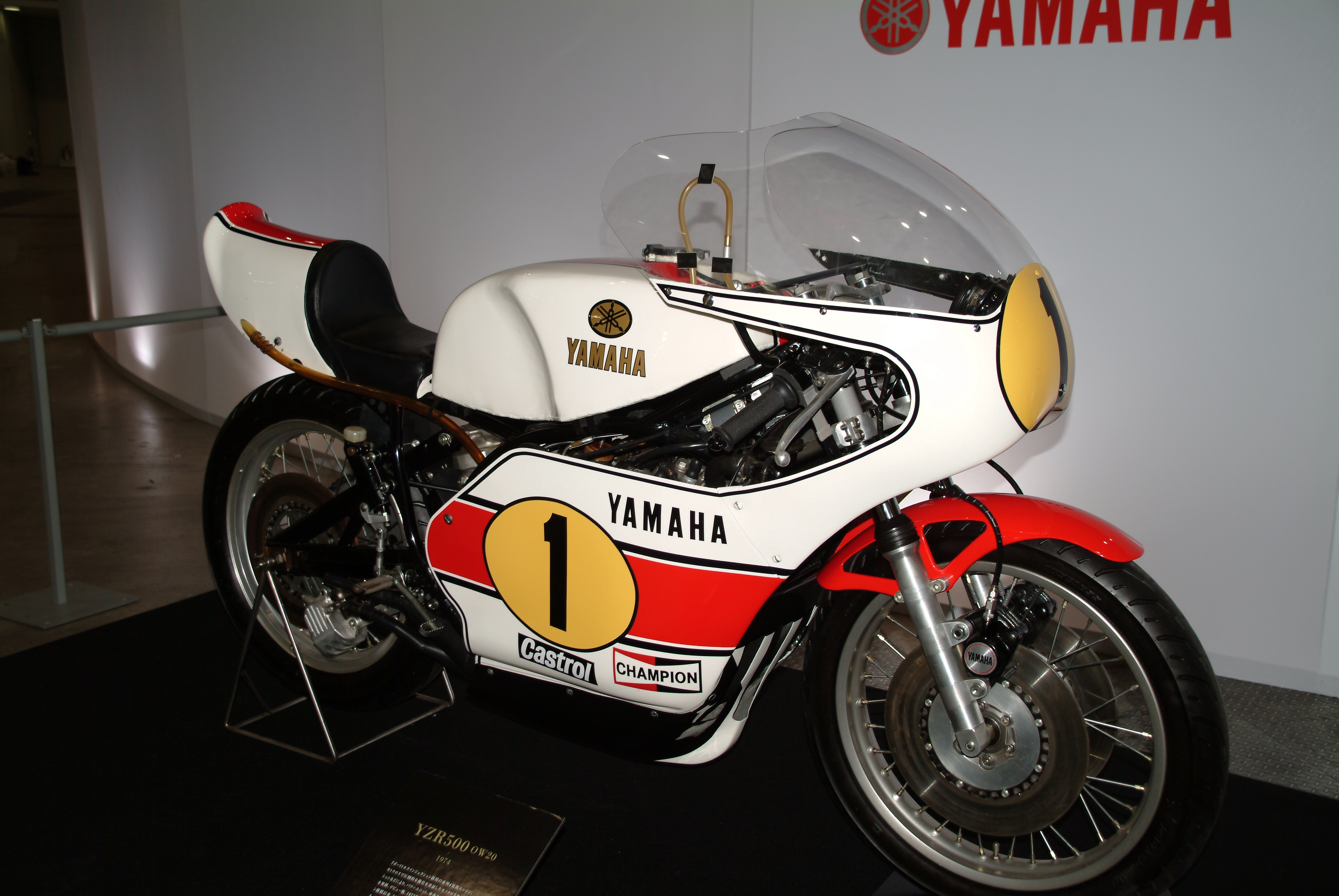
The Yamaha YZR500, ridden by Giacomo Agostini in the 1974 season, on display

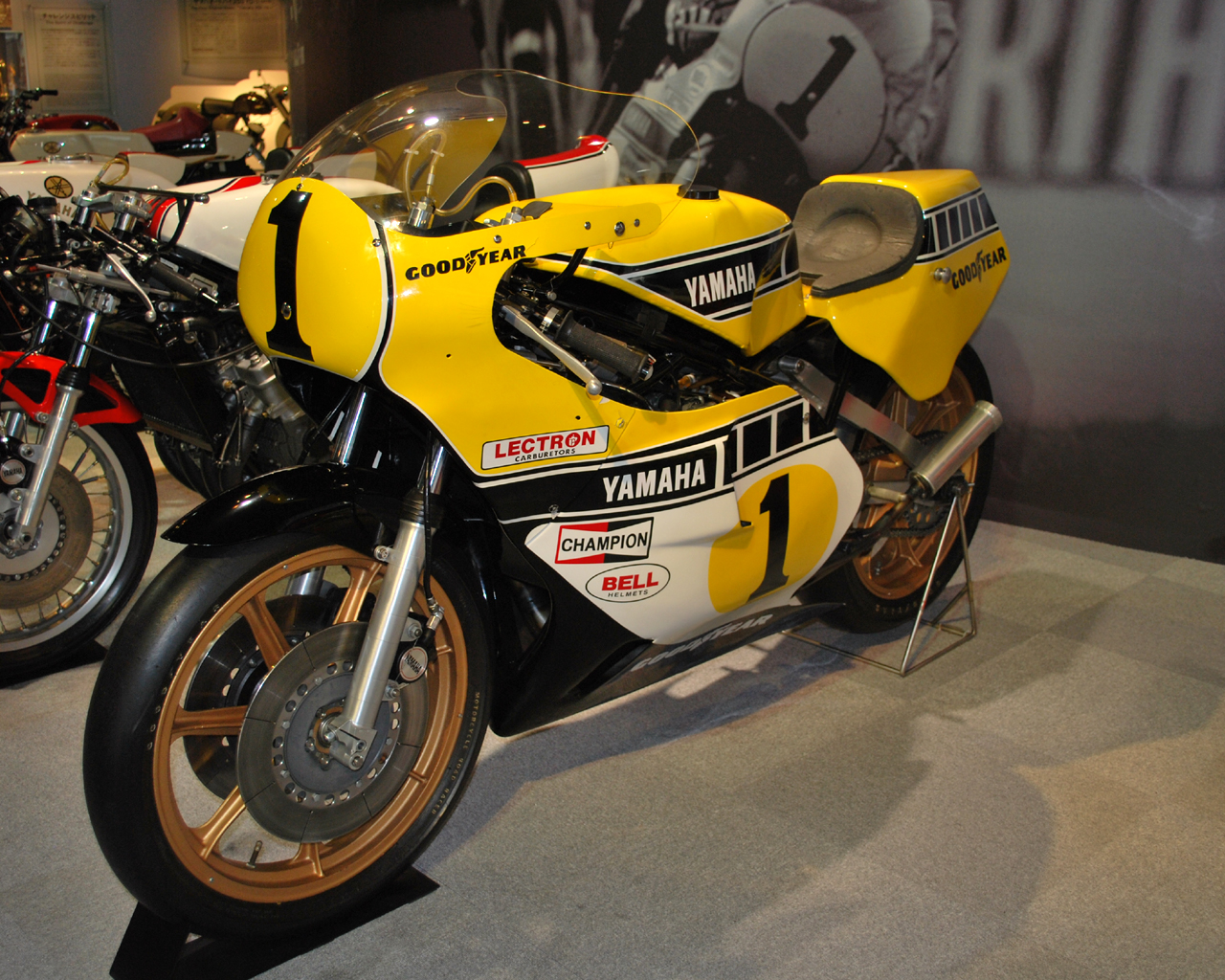
The Yamaha YZR500, ridden by Kenny Roberts in the 1978 season, on display

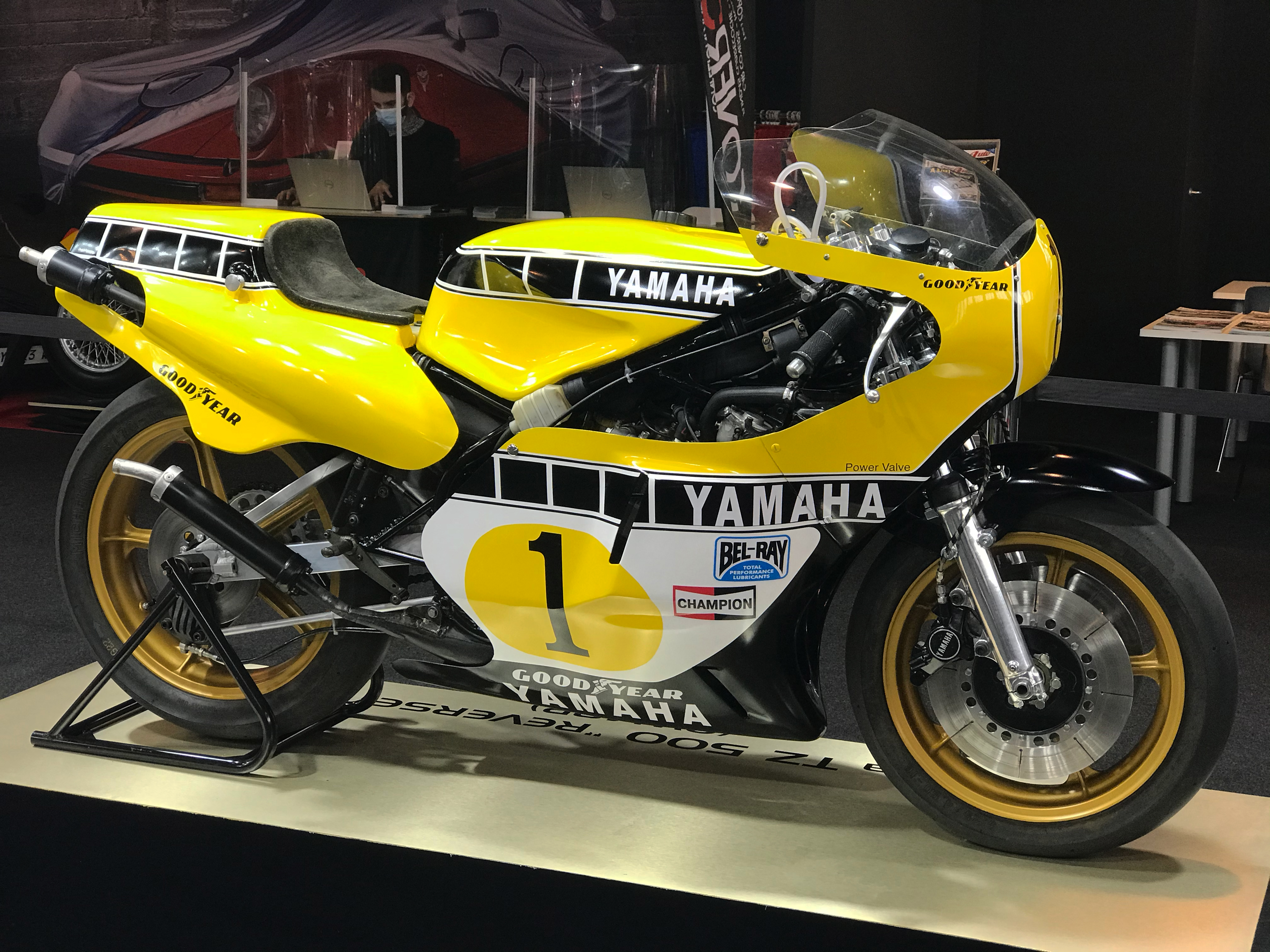
The Yamaha YZR500, ridden by Kenny Roberts in the 1980 season, on display

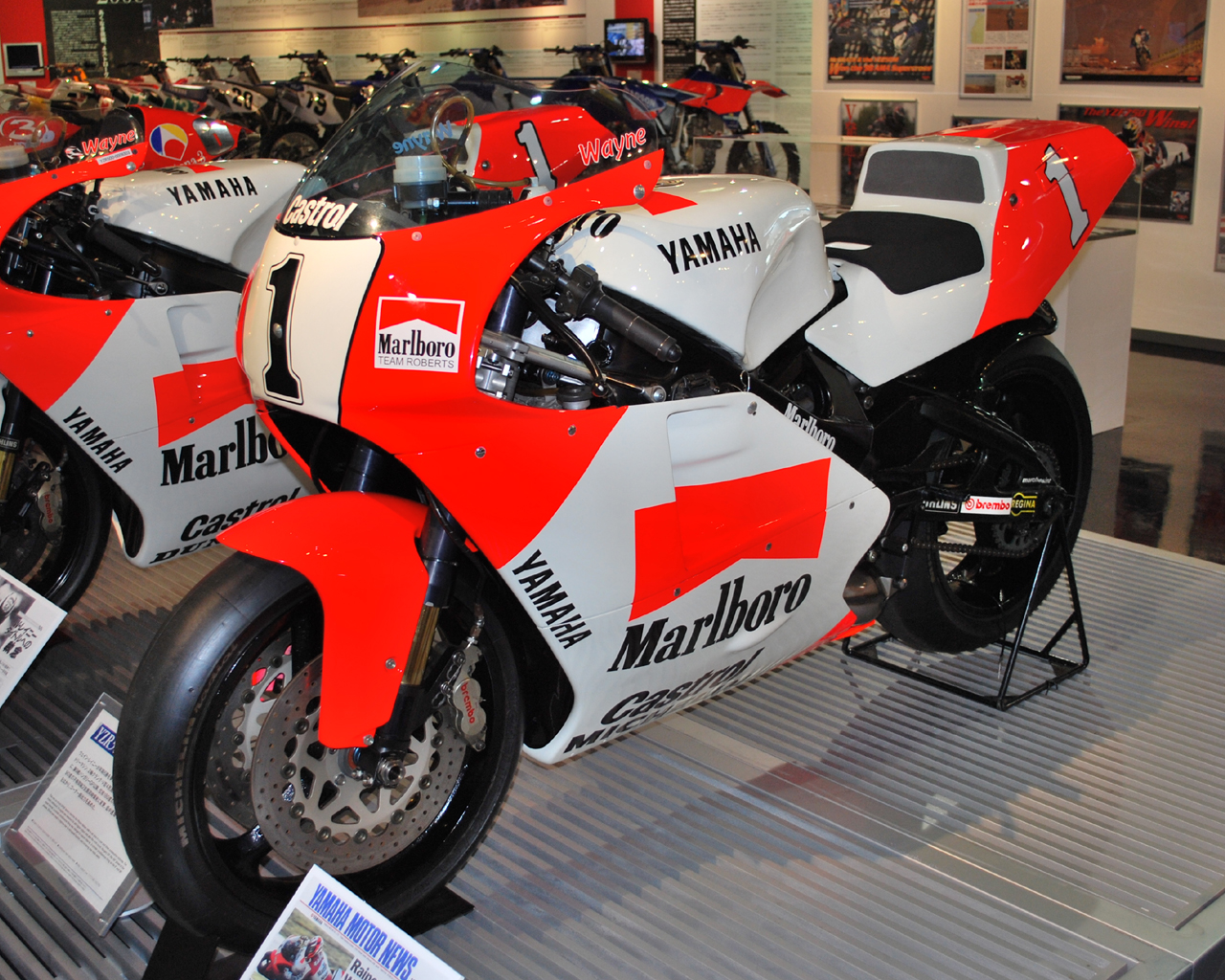
The Marlboro Yamaha YZR500, ridden by Wayne Rainey in the 1992 season on display.

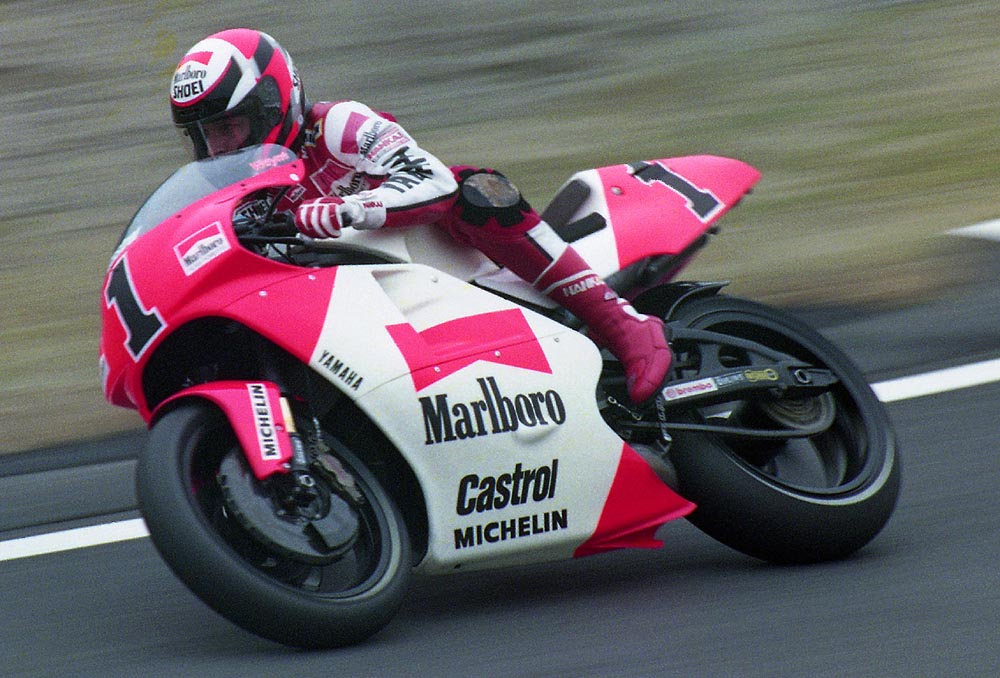
Wayne Rainey, riding his Marlboro Yamaha YZR500 at the 1992 Japanese Grand Prix.

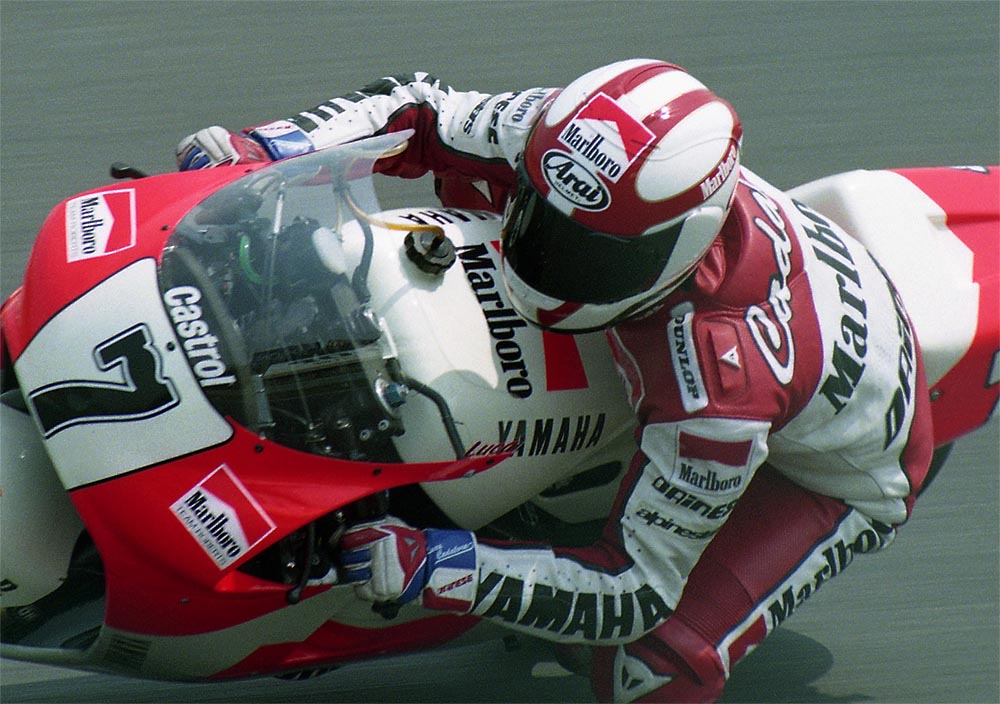
Luca Cadalora, riding his Marlboro Yamaha YZR500 at the 1993 Japanese Grand Prix.

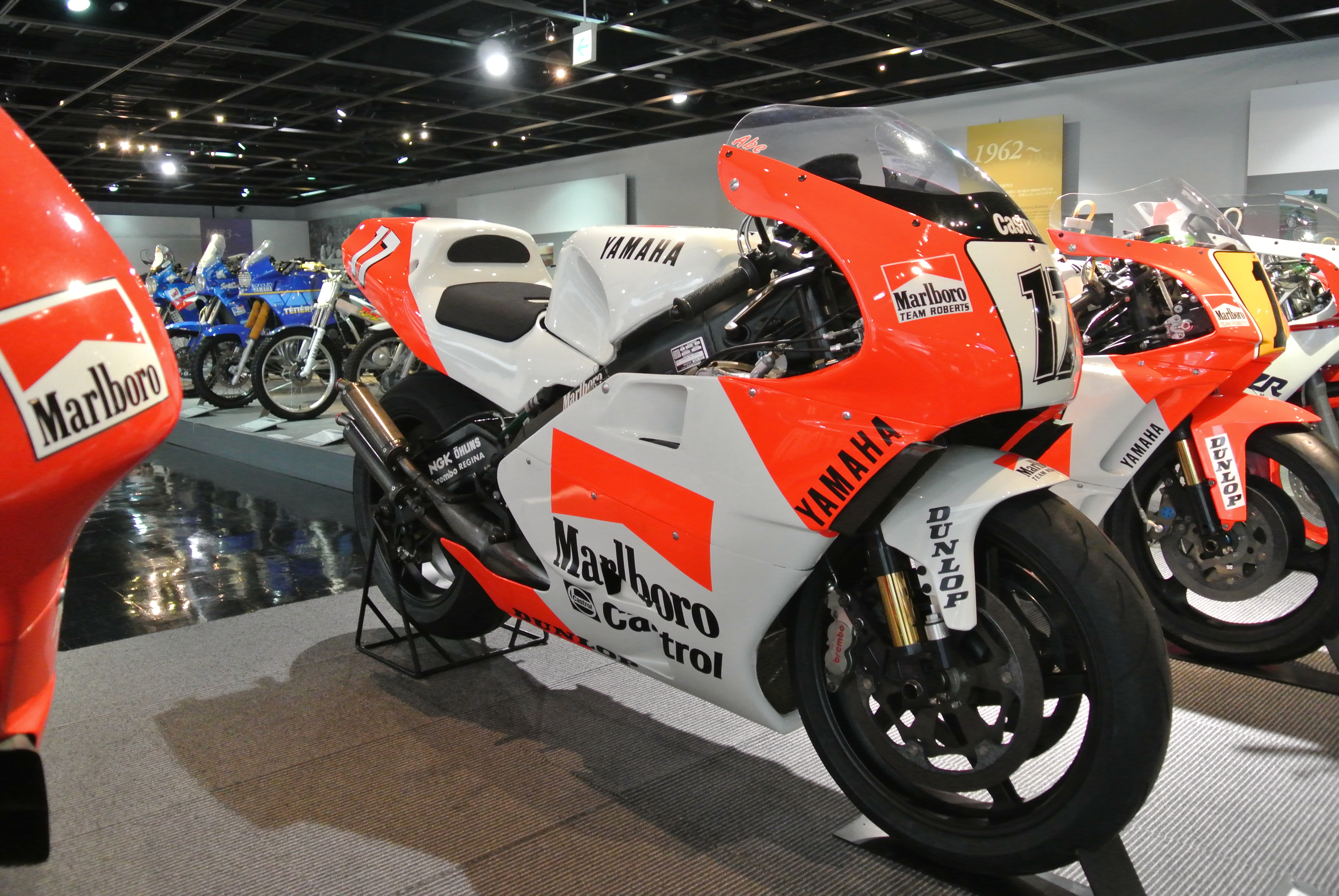
The Marlboro Yamaha YZR500, ridden by Norifumi Abe in the 1995 season on display.

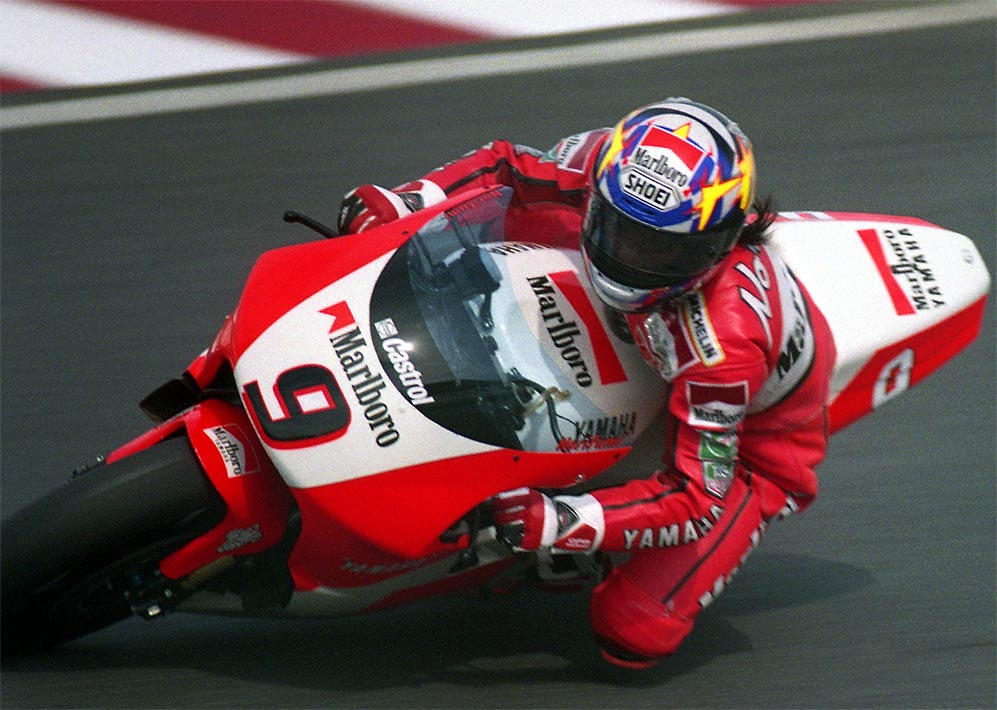
Norifumi Abe, riding his Marlboro Yamaha YZR500 at the 1996 Japanese Grand Prix.

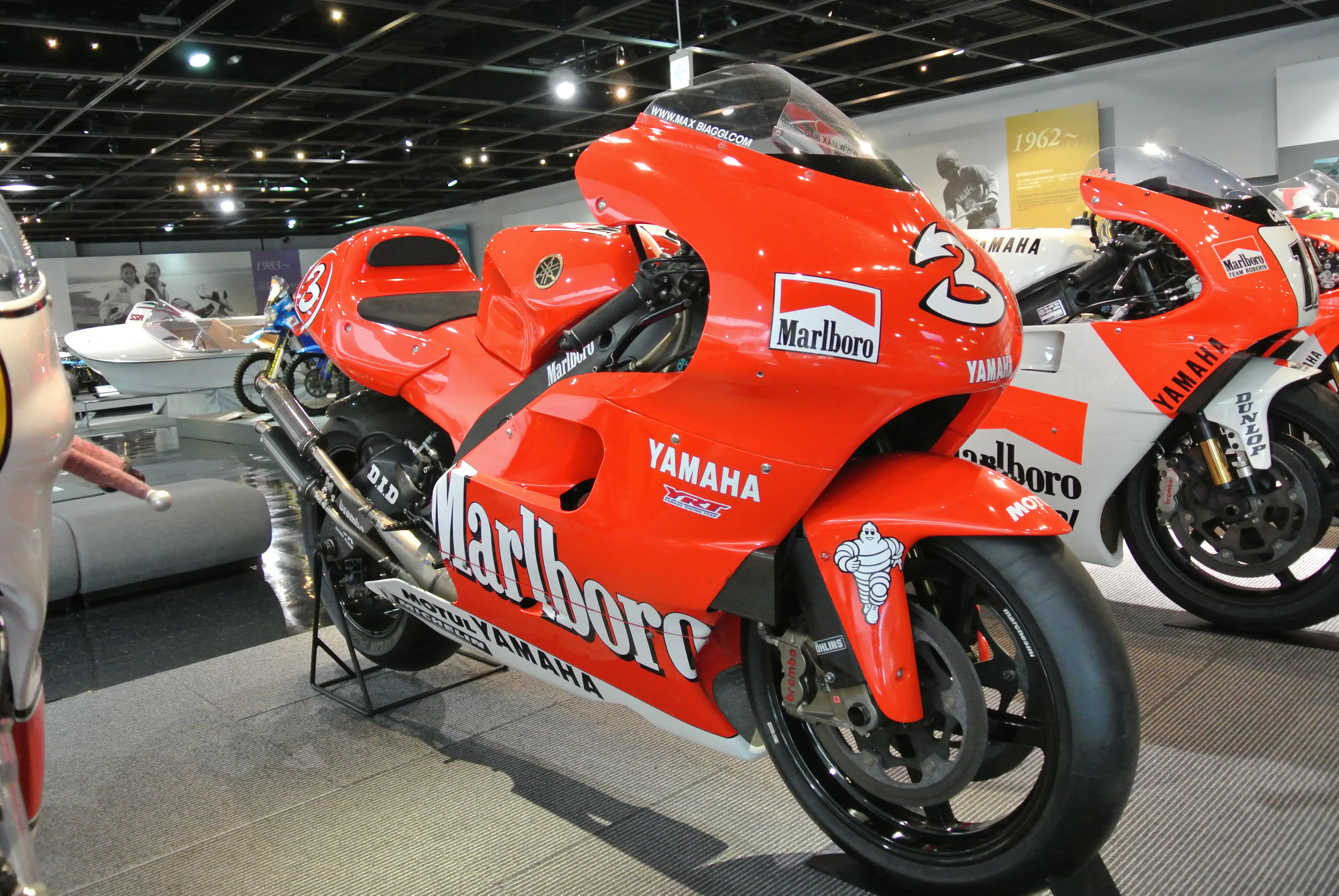
The Marlboro Yamaha YZR500, ridden by Max Biaggi in the 2001 season on display.

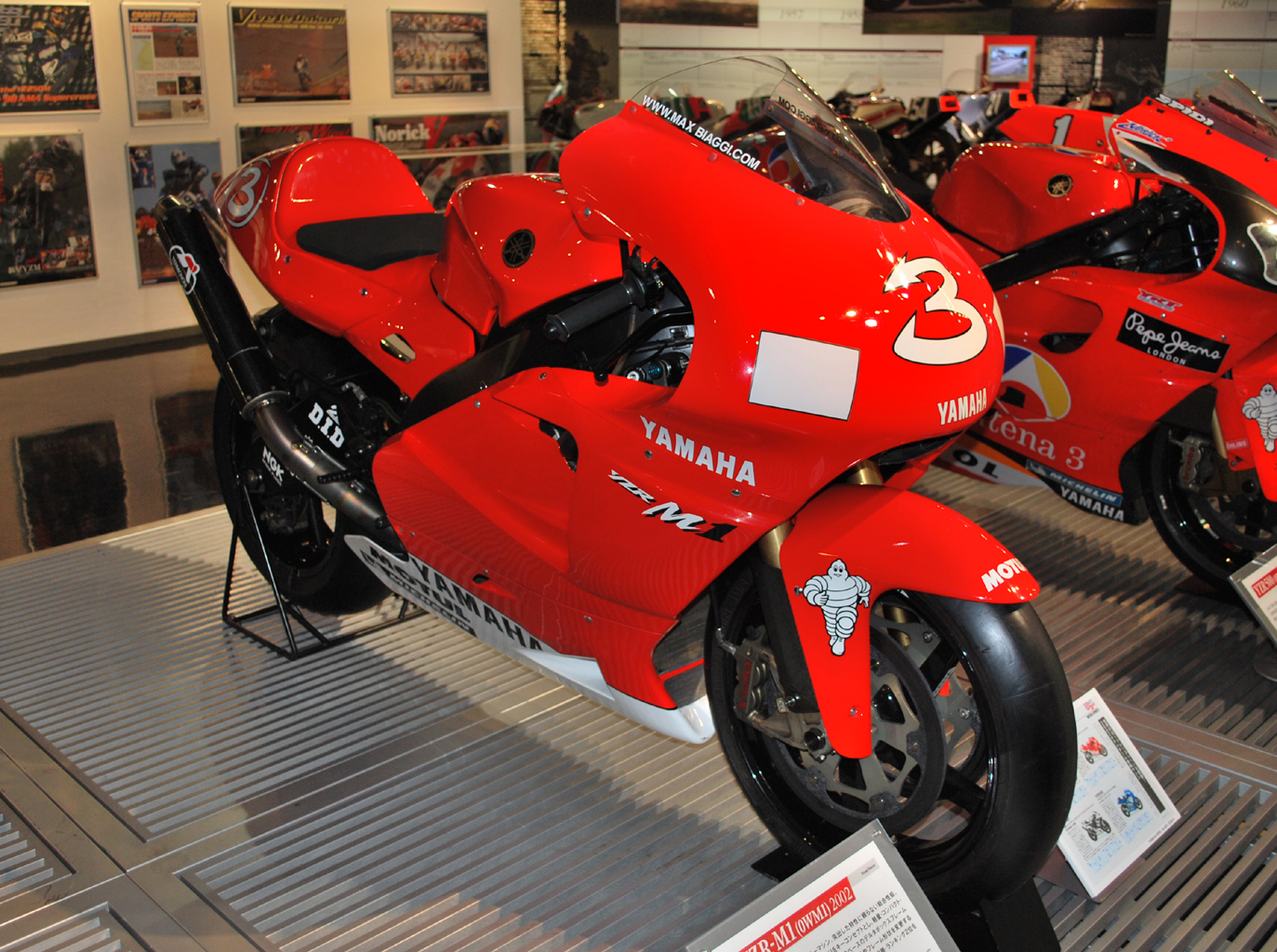
The Marlboro Yamaha YZR-M1, ridden by Max Biaggi in the 2002 season on display. The Marlboro logo's have been removed on this bike.

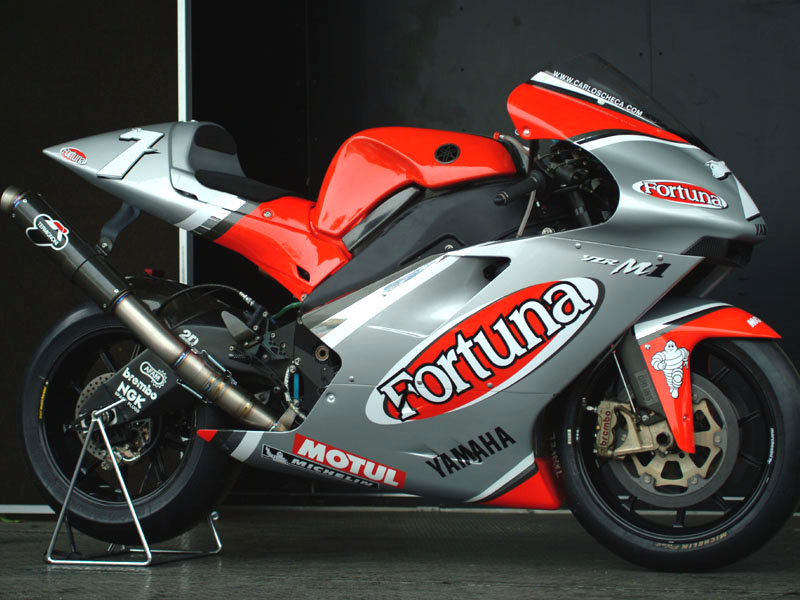
The Fortuna Yamaha YZR-M1, ridden by Carlos Checa in the 2003 season on display.

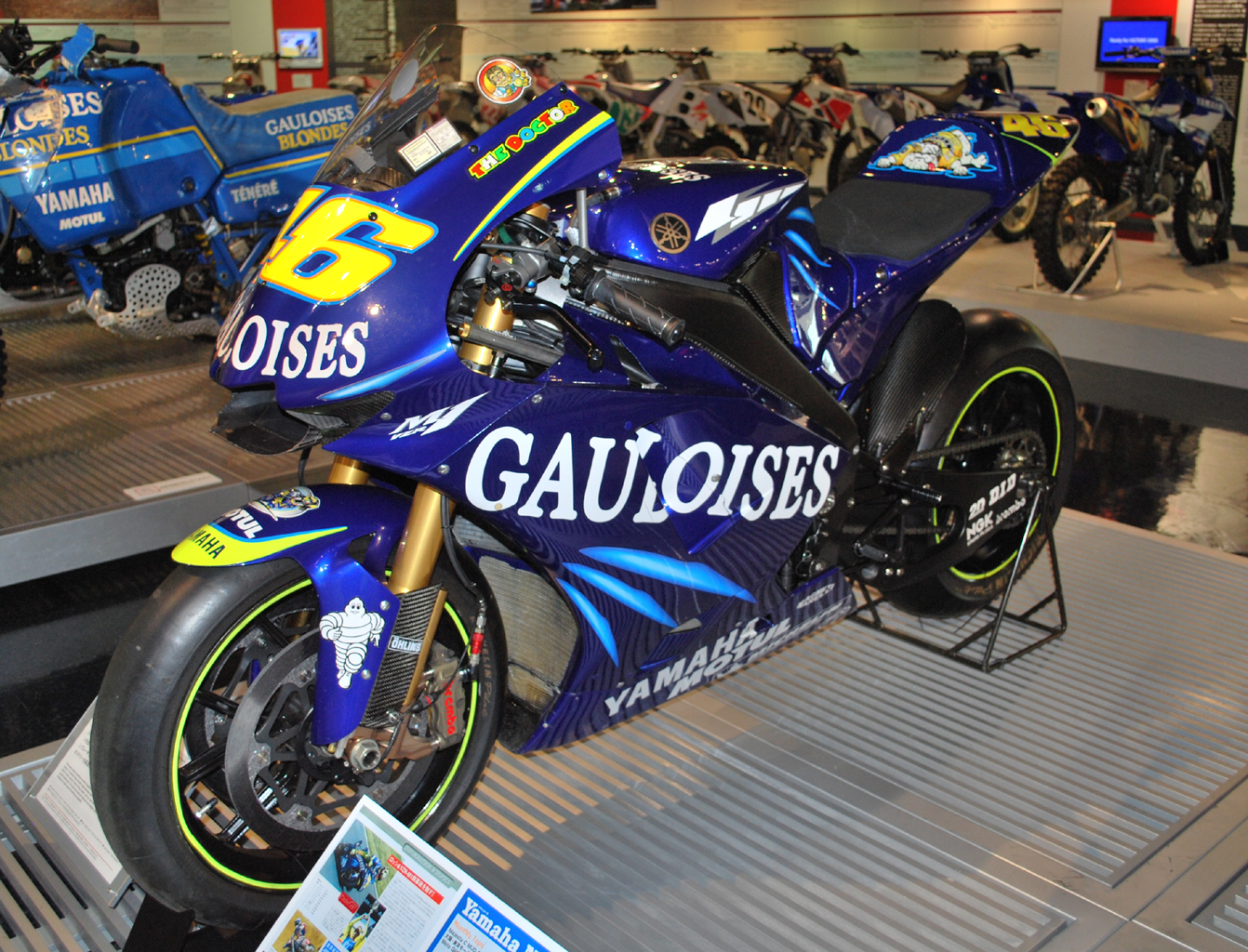
The Gauloises Yamaha YZR-M1, ridden by Valentino Rossi in the 2004 season on display.

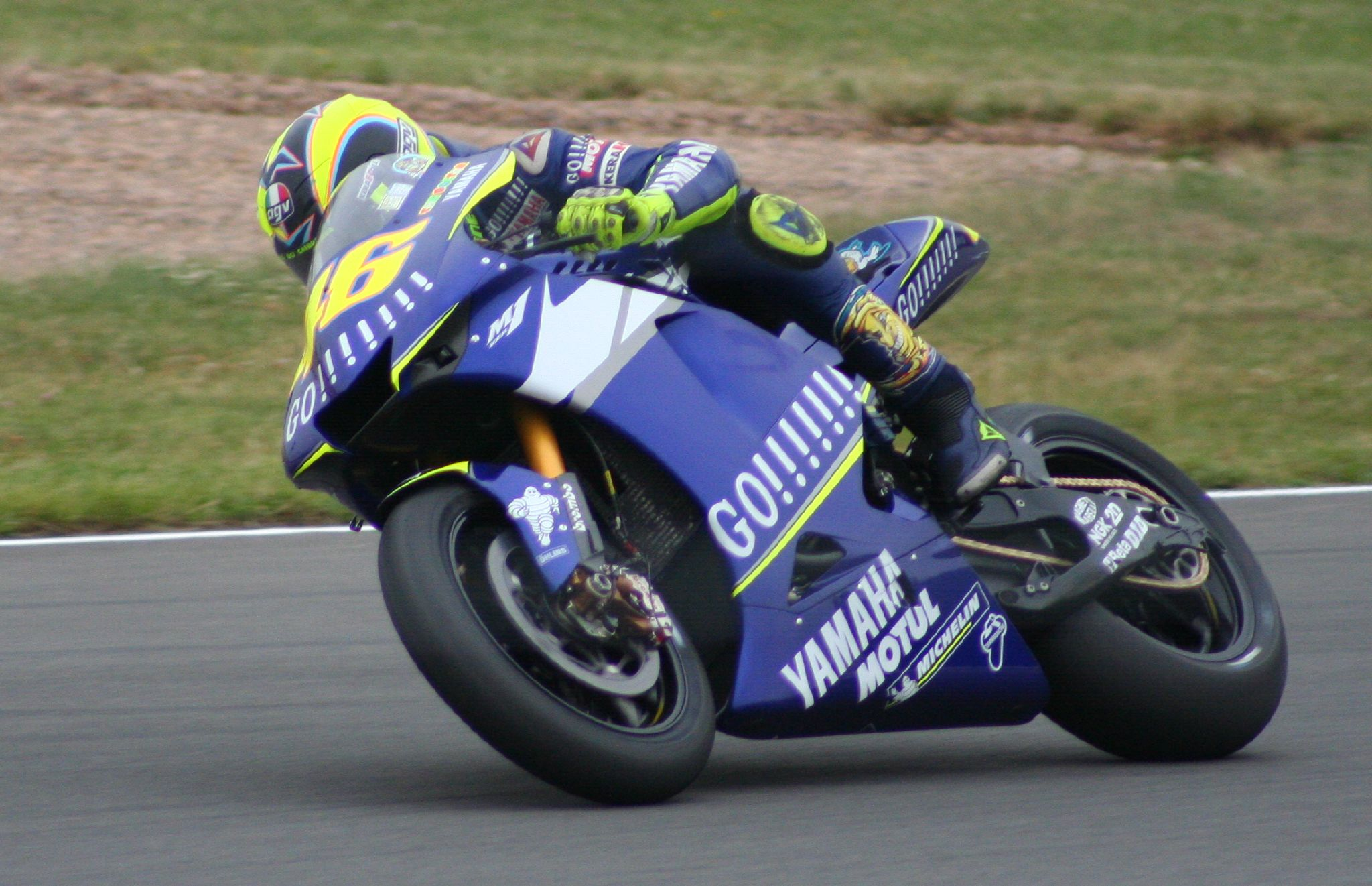
Valentino Rossi riding his 2005 Gauloises Yamaha YZR-M1.

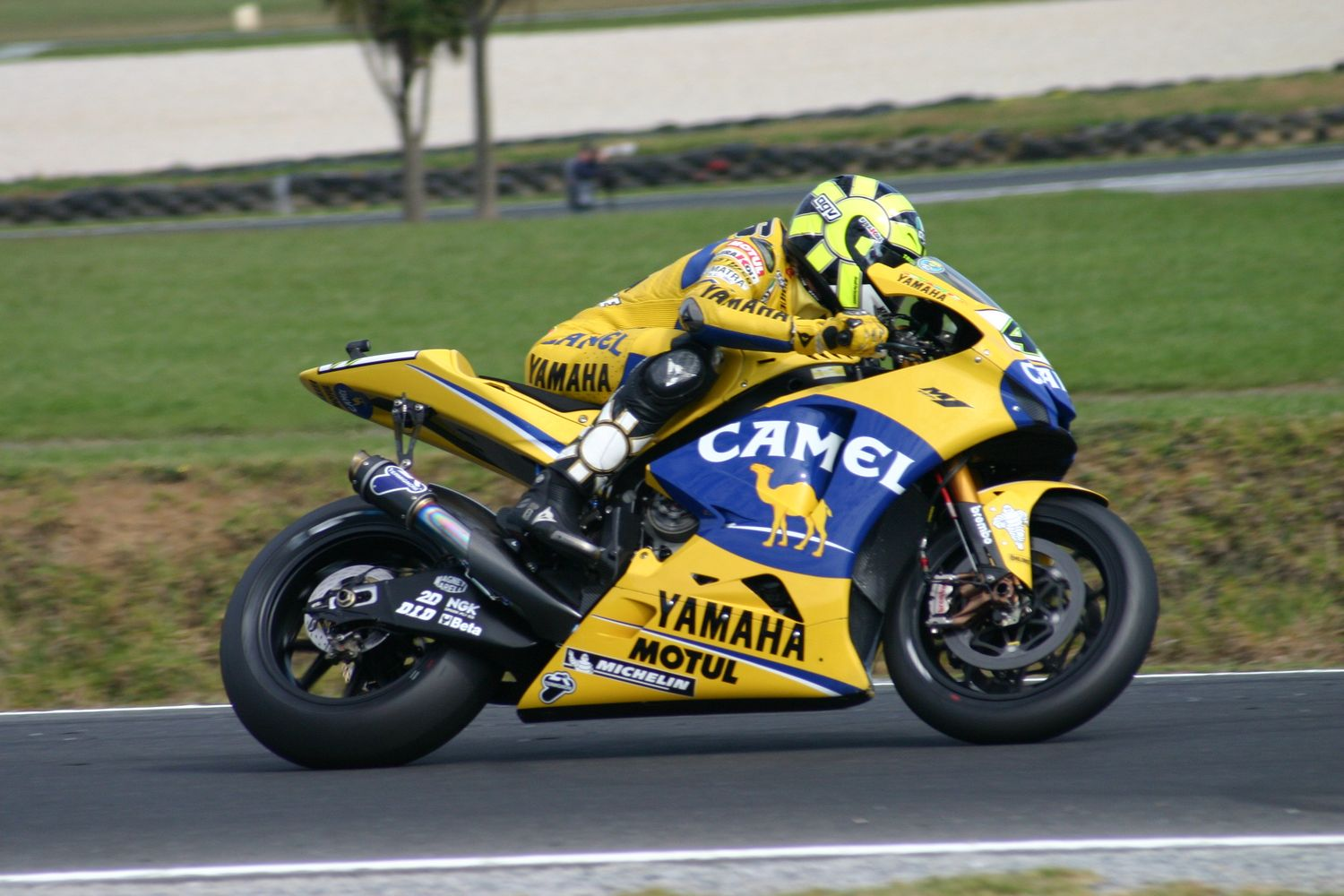
Valentino Rossi riding his 2006 Camel Yamaha YZR-M1.

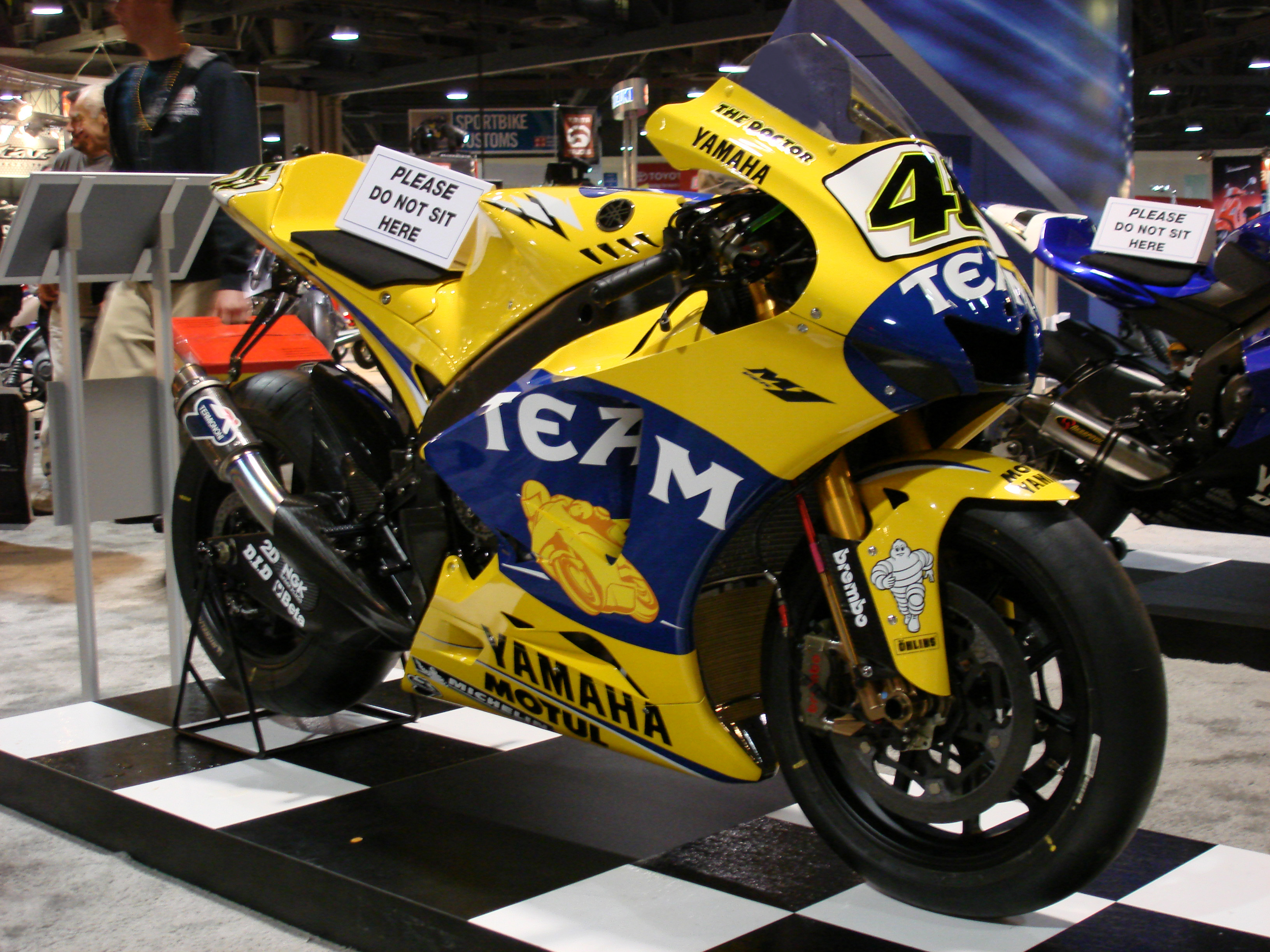
The Camel Yamaha YZR-M1, ridden by Valentino Rossi in the 2006 season on display. The Camel names and logo's have been changed with "Team" and a motorcycle.

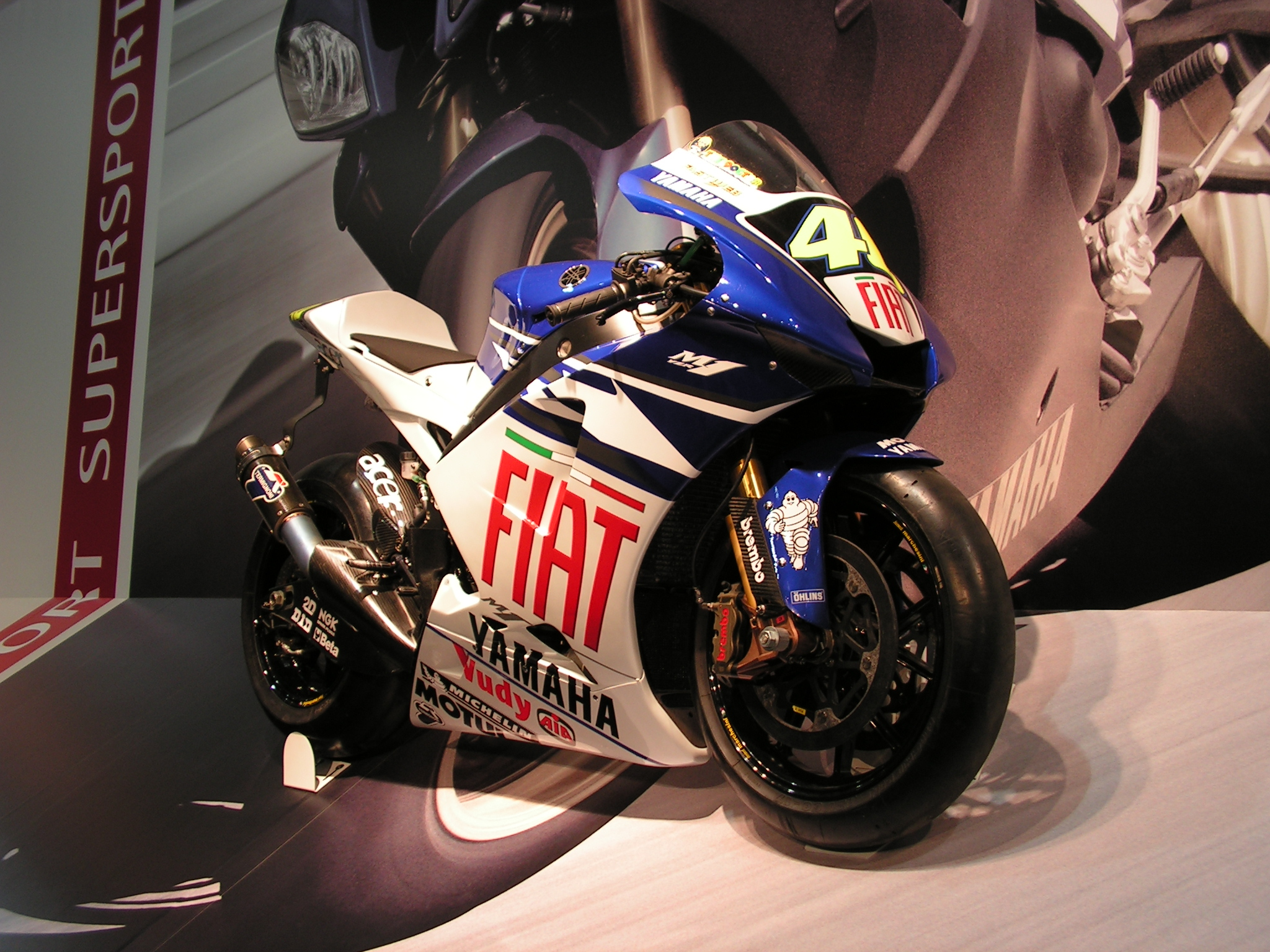
The FIAT Yamaha YZR-M1, ridden by Colin Edwards in the 2007 season on display.

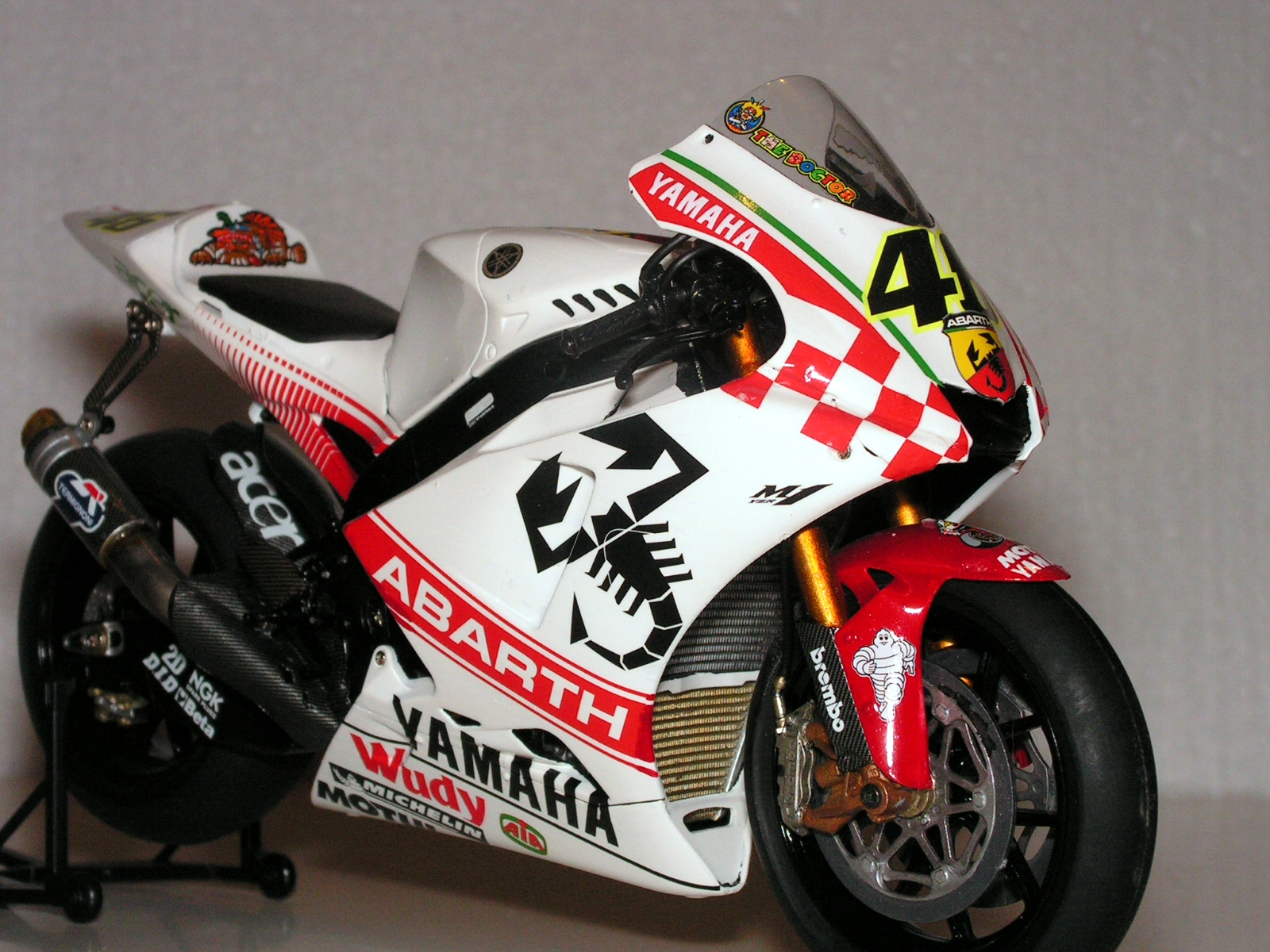
The "Abarth" version of the 2007 FIAT Yamaha YZR-M1, ridden at the 2007 Australian Grand Prix.

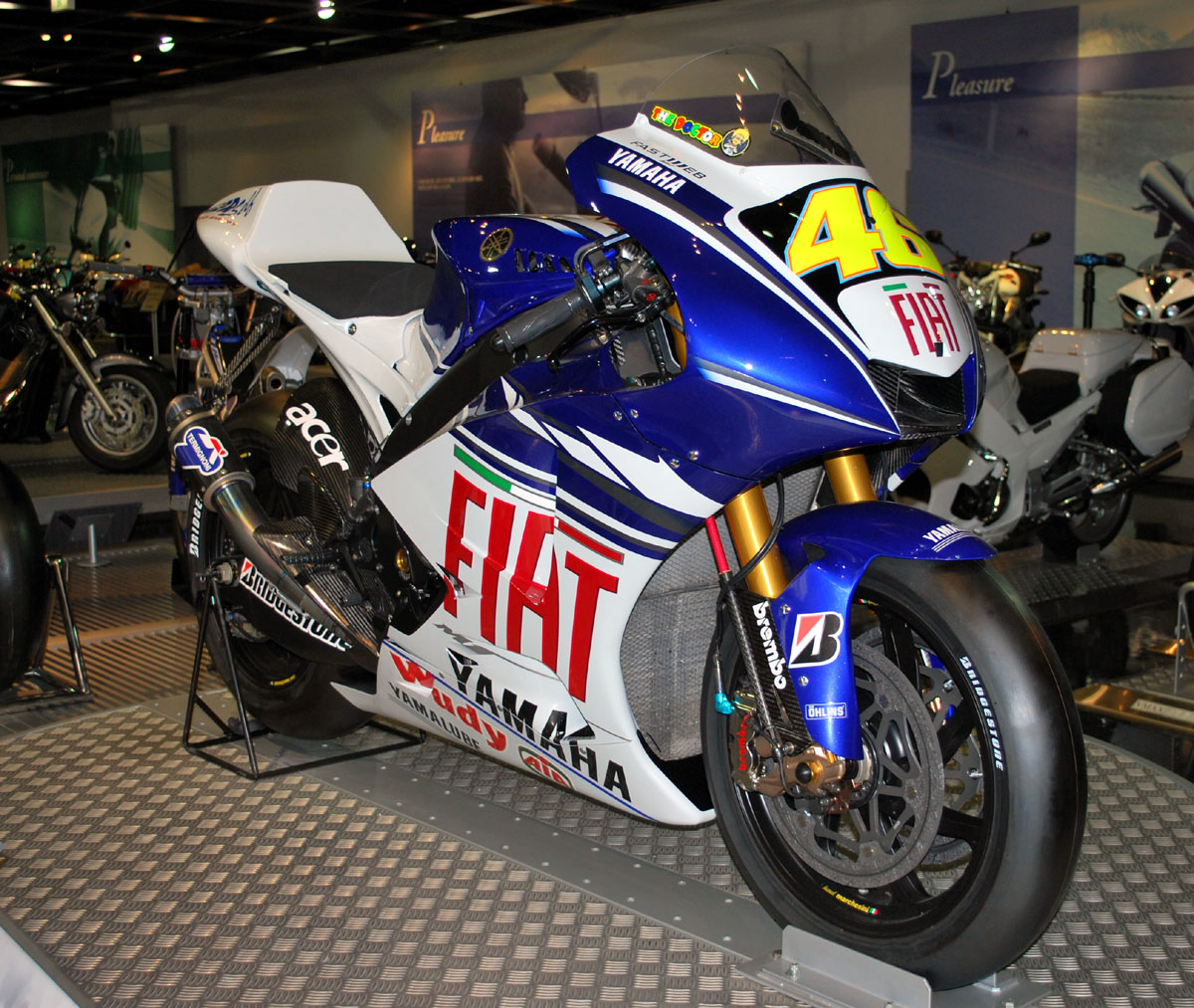
The FIAT Yamaha YZR-M1, ridden by Valentino Rossi in the 2008 season on display.

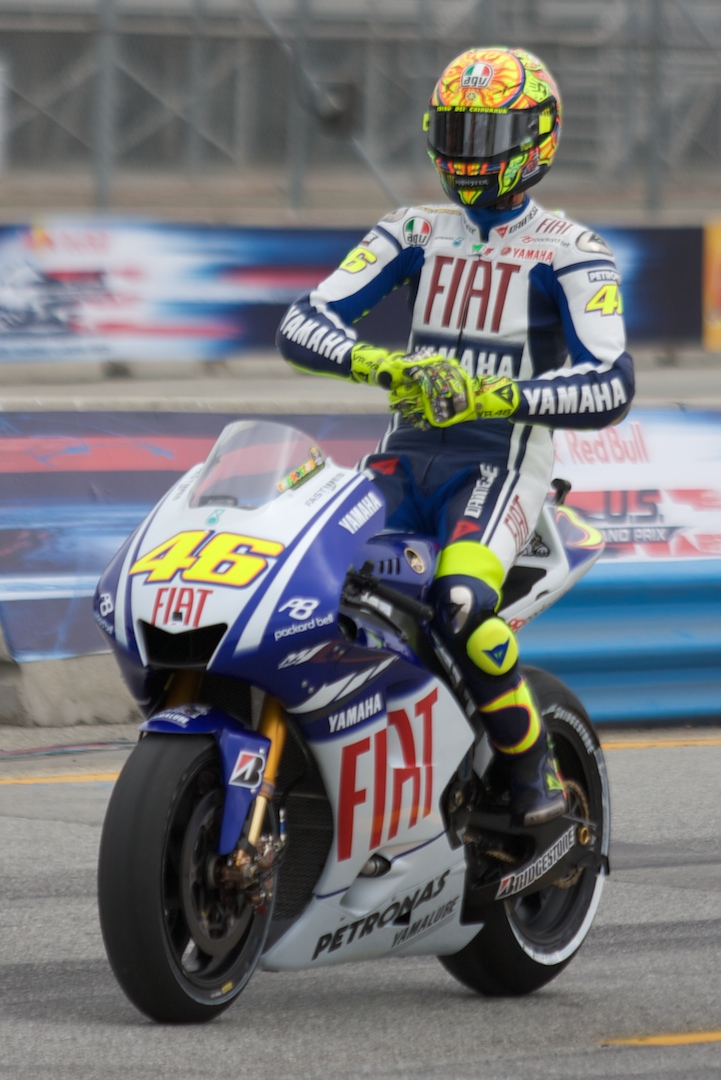
Valentino Rossi on his FIAT Yamaha YZR-M1 during the 2009 United States Grand Prix.

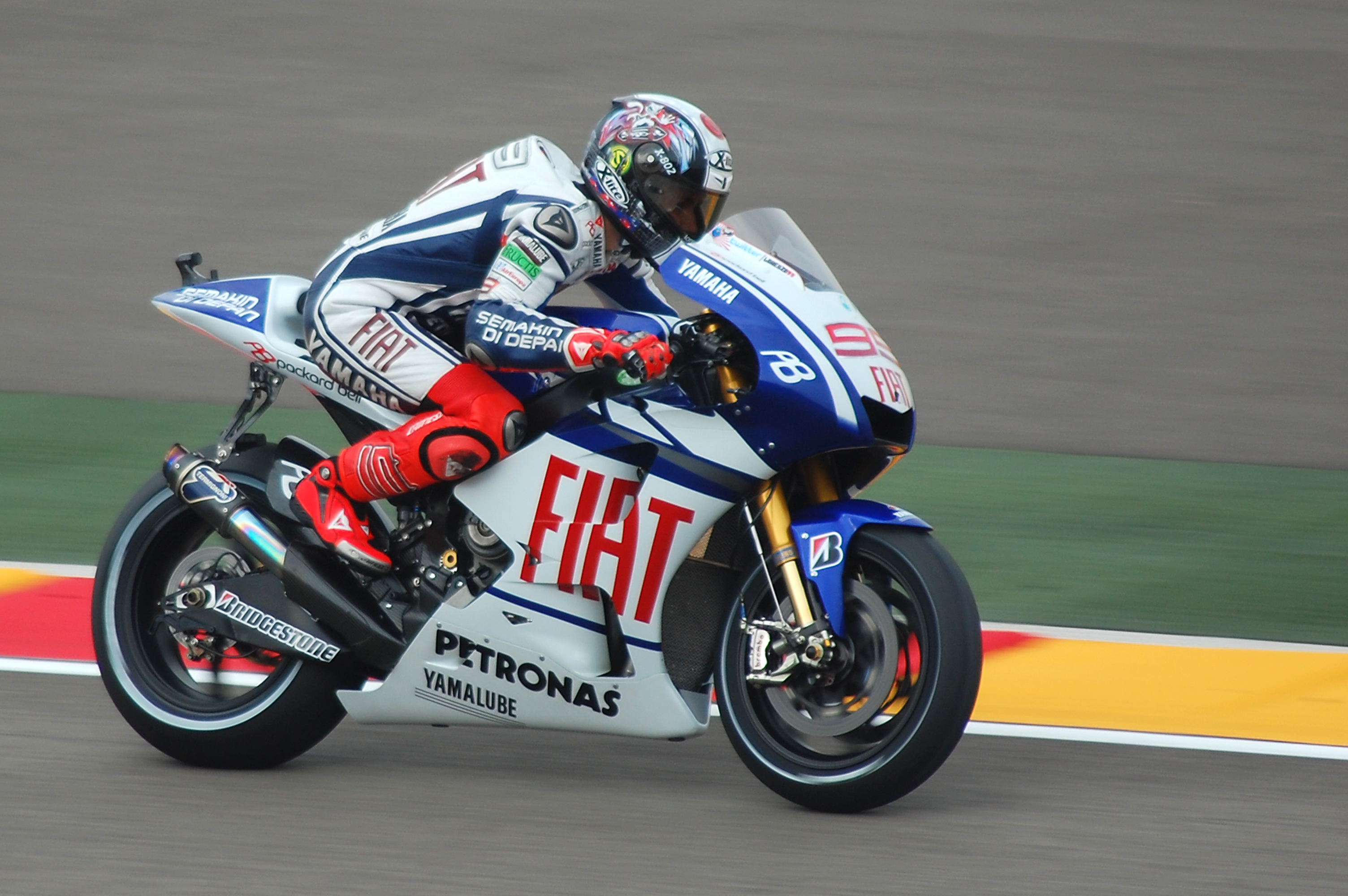
Jorge Lorenzo riding his FIAT Yamaha YZR-M1's at the 2010 Aragon Grand Prix.

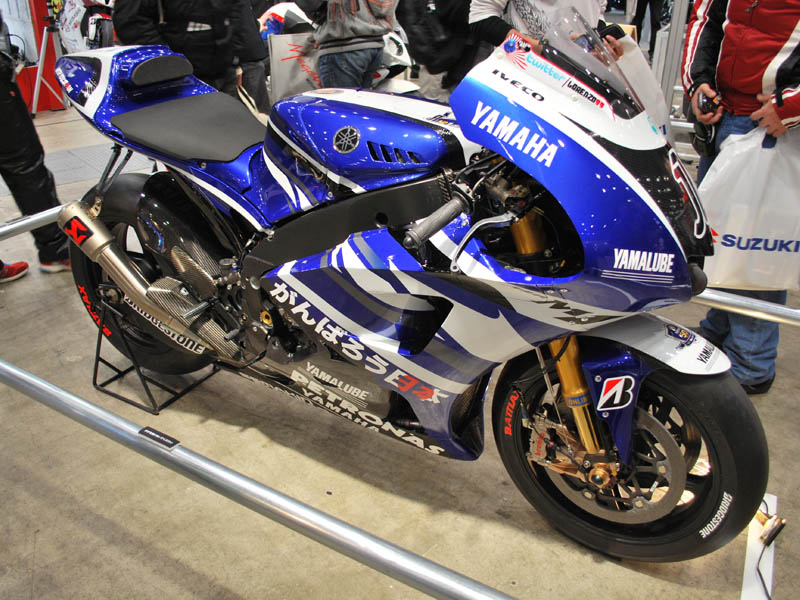
The Yamaha YZR-M1, ridden by Jorge Lorenzo in the 2011 season on display.

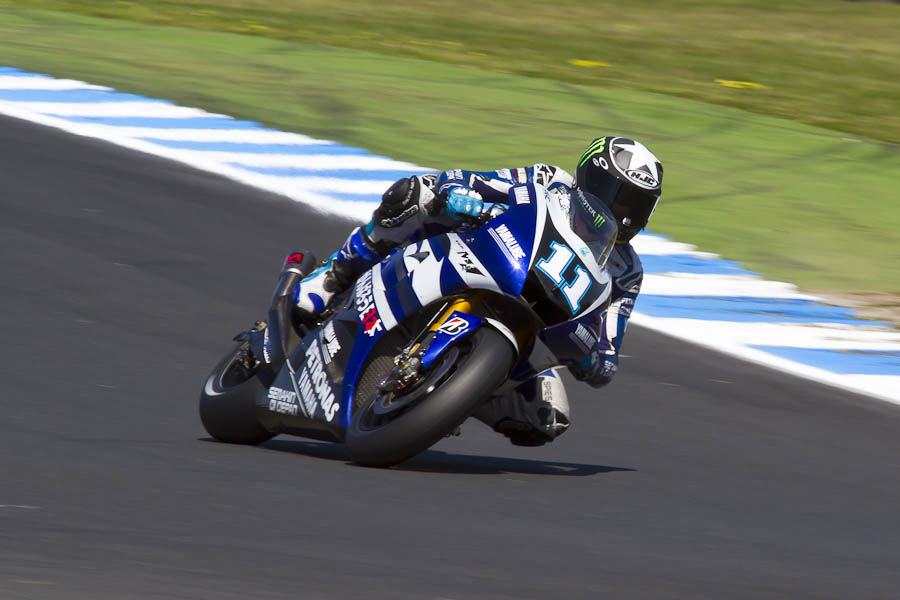
Ben Spies, riding his Yamaha YZR-M1 at the 2011 Australian Grand Prix.

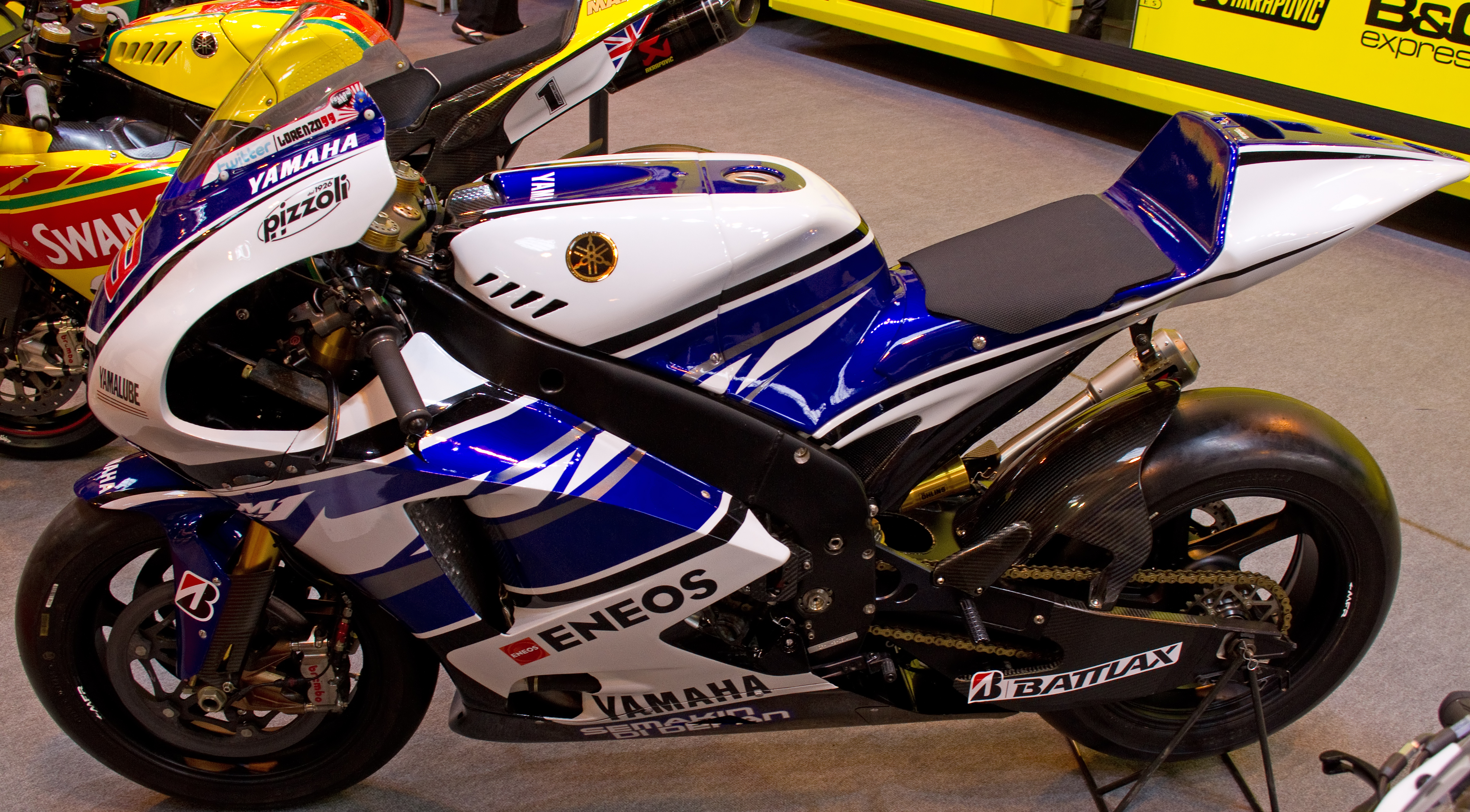
The Yamaha YZR-M1, ridden by Jorge Lorenzo in the 2012 season on display.

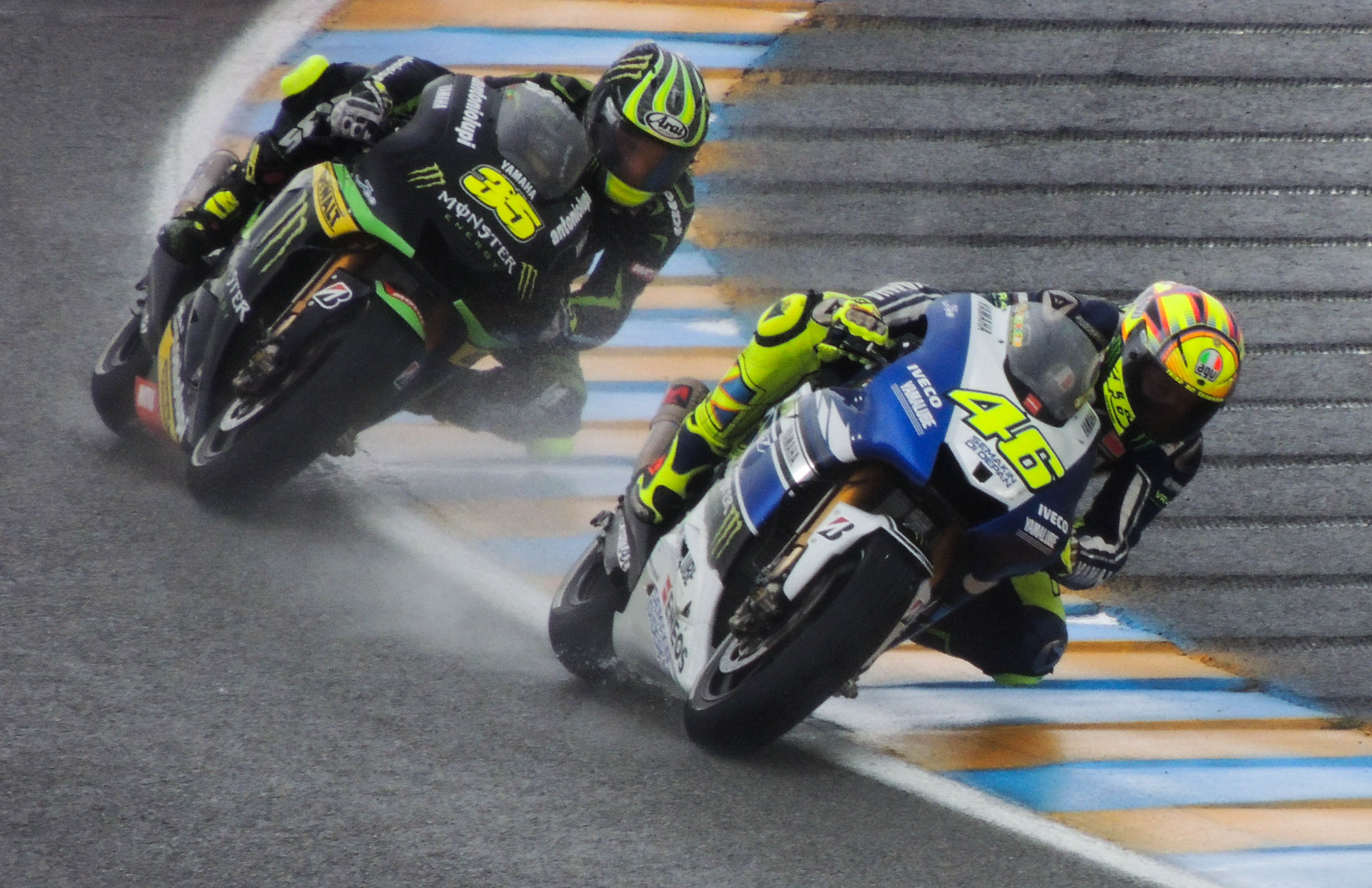
Valentino Rossi riding his Yamaha YZR-M1 at the 2013 French Grand Prix.

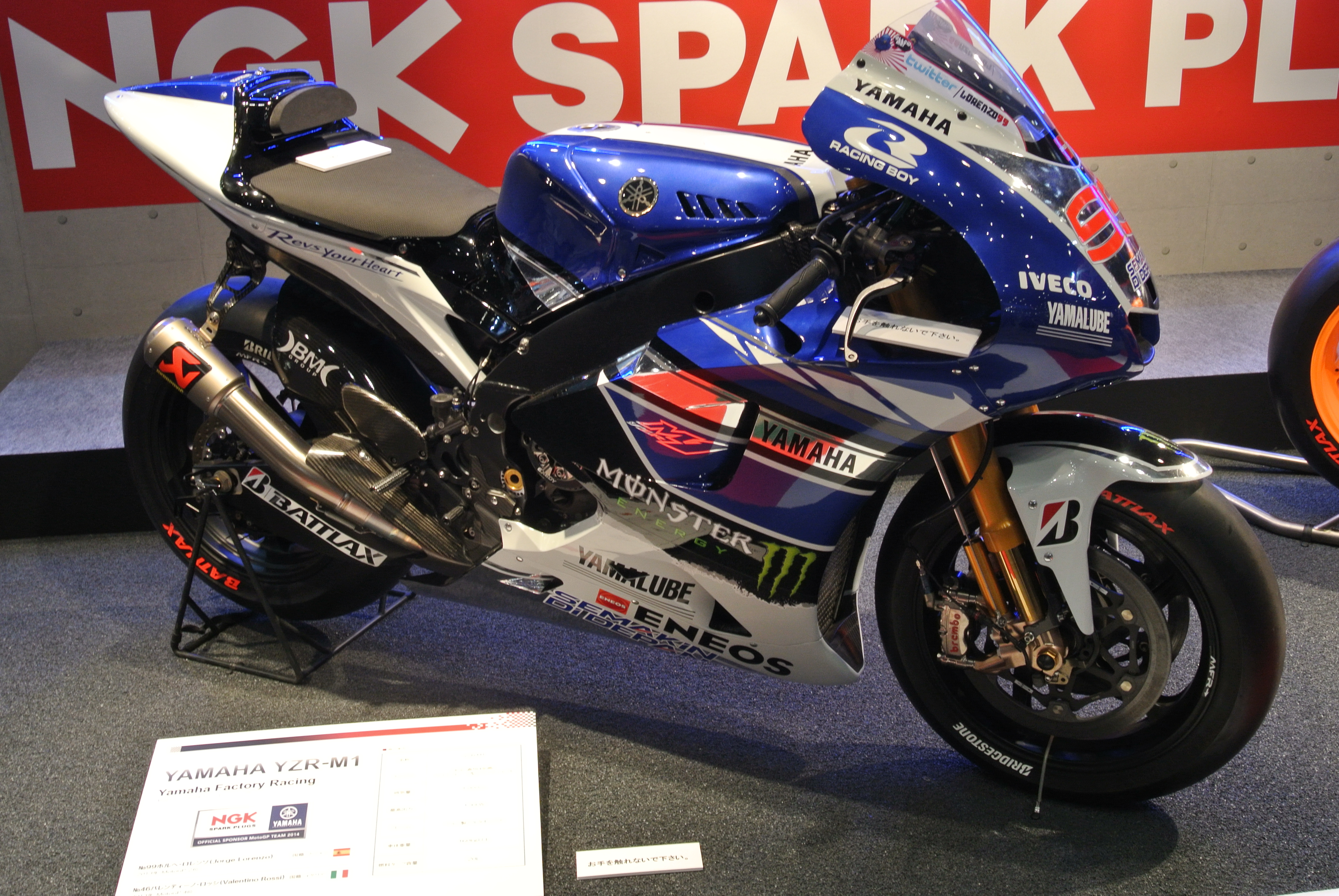
The Yamaha YZR-M1, ridden by Jorge Lorenzo in the 2014 season on display.

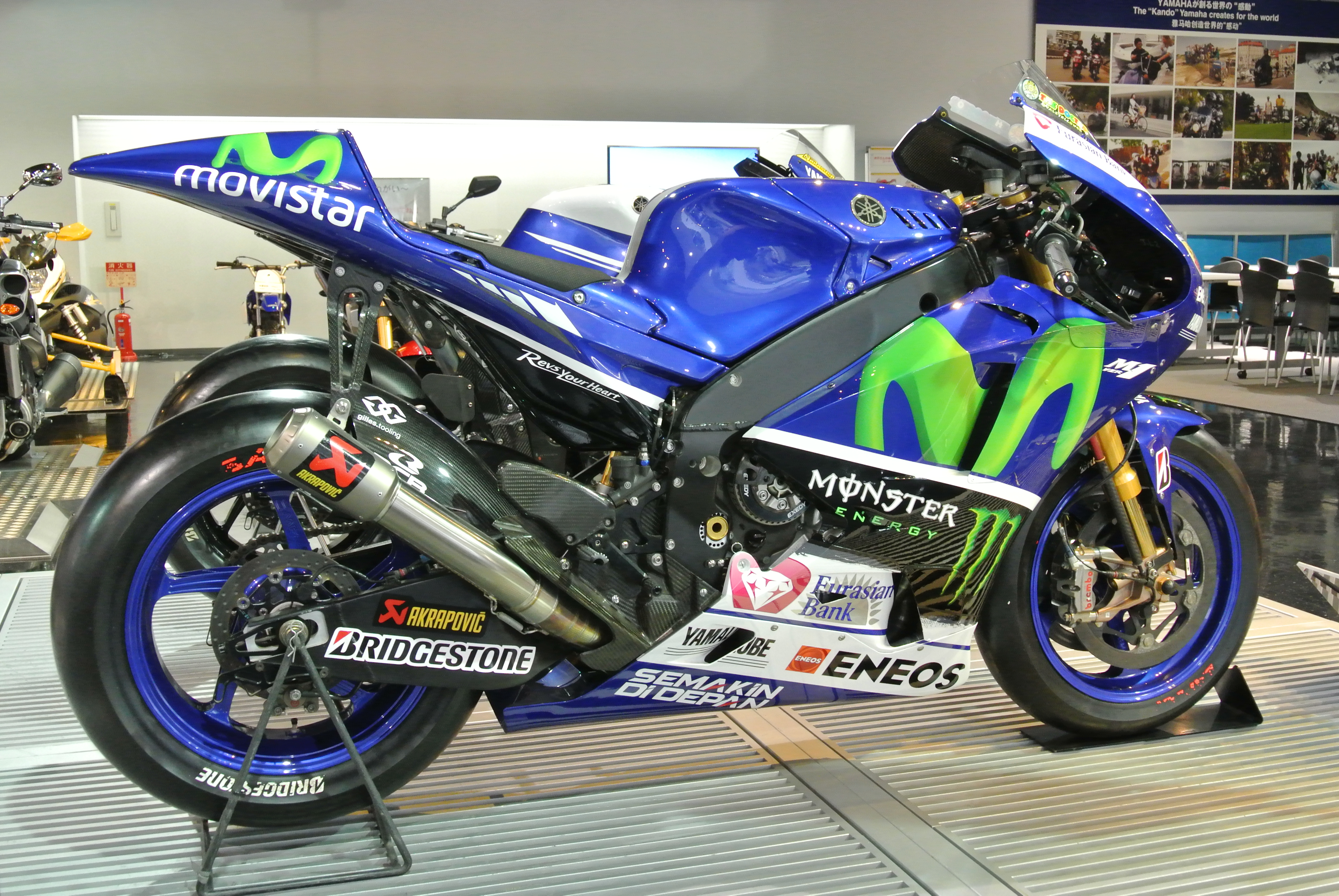
The Movistar Yamaha YZR-M1, ridden by Valentino Rossi in the 2015 season on display.

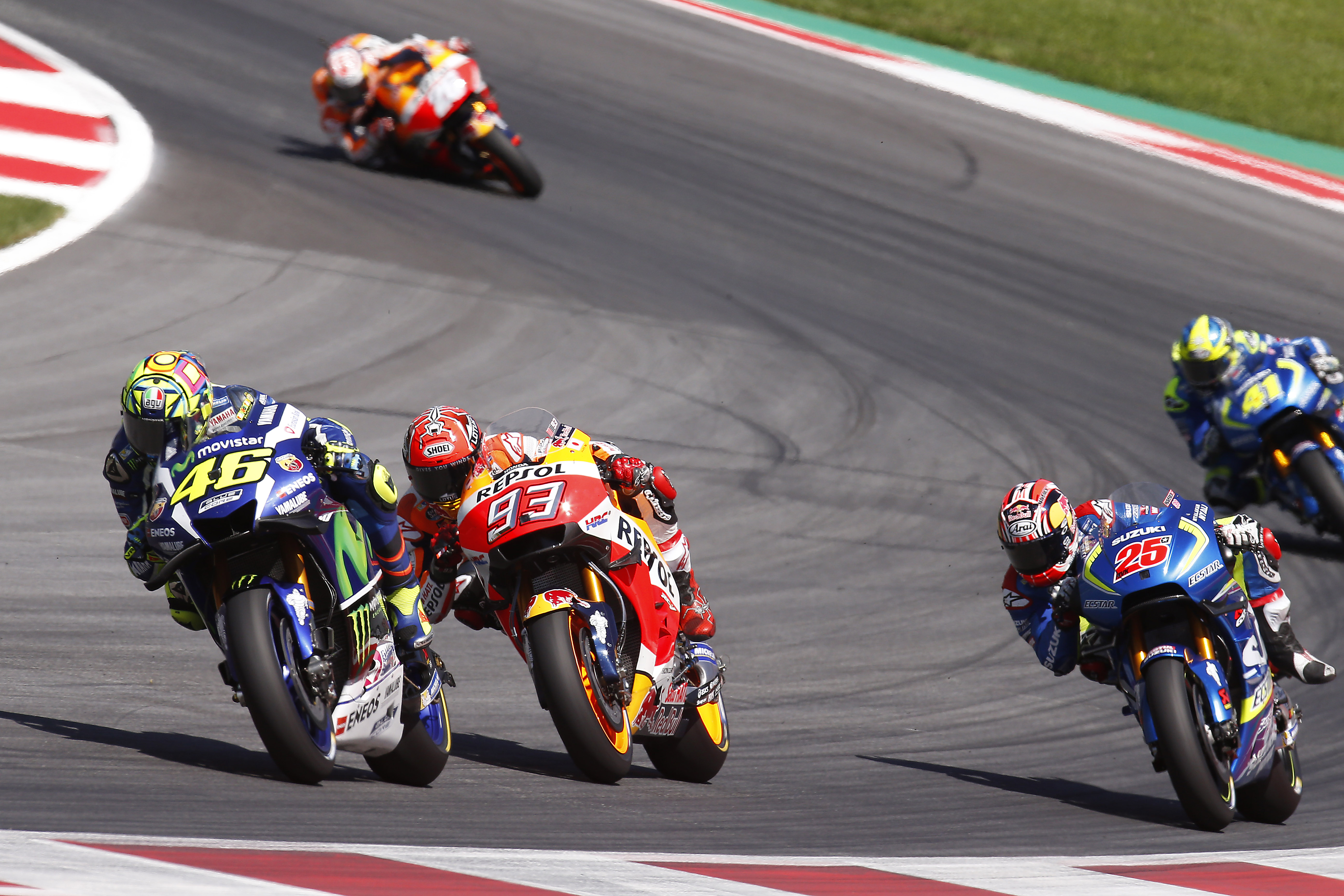
Valentino Rossi, riding his Movistar Yamaha YZR-M1 at the 2016 Austrian Grand Prix.

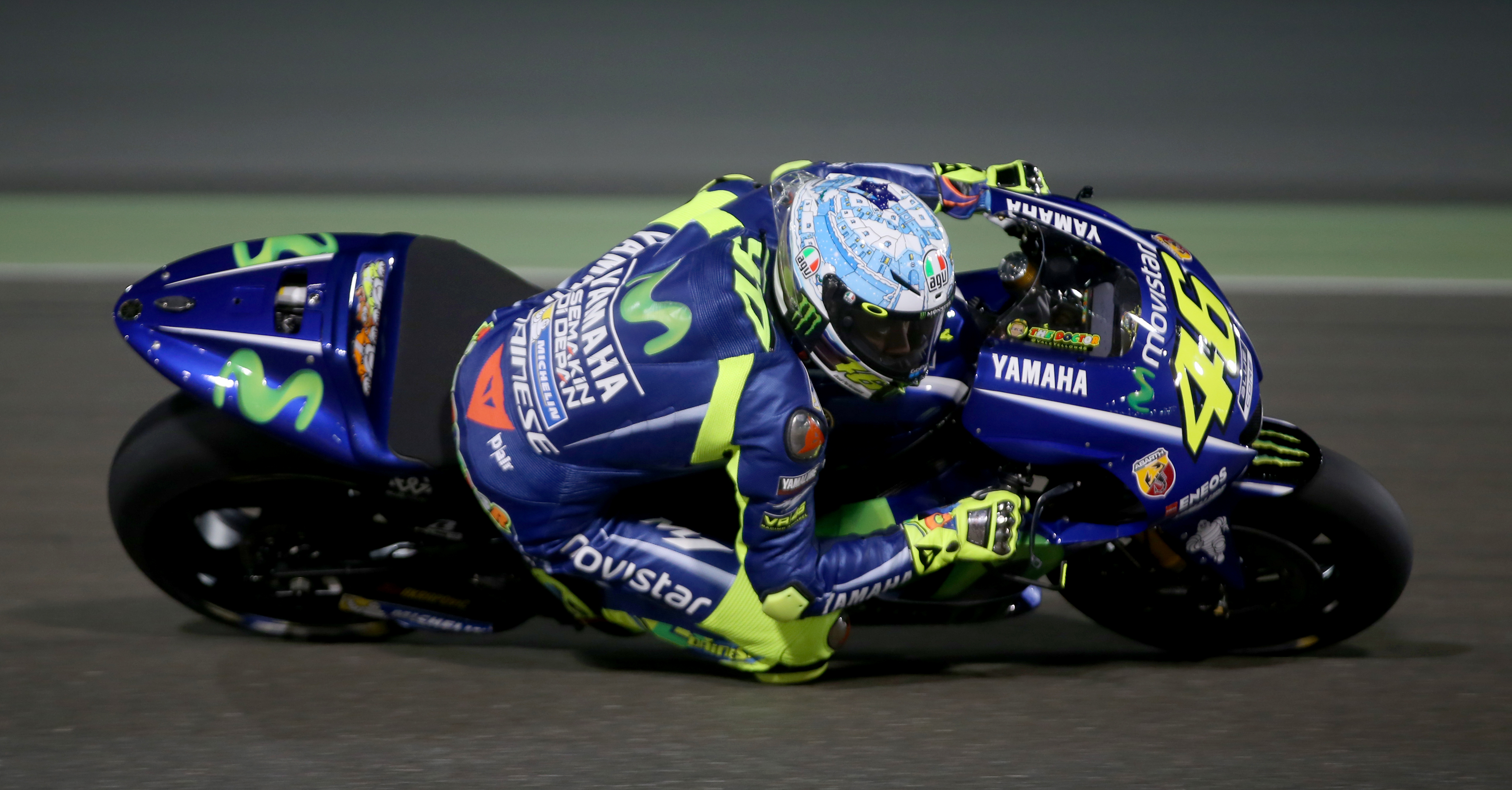
Valentino Rossi, riding his Movistar Yamaha YZR-M1 at the 2017 Qatar Grand Prix.
