= Slavic Union (Poland) =

Slavic Union Związek Słowiański
- Abbreviation: ZS
- Leader: Zbigniew Adamczyk
- Founded: 2004
- Registered: 3 August 2006
- Headquarters: ul. Jaworzyńska 8/10, 00-634 Warsaw
- Membership (2016): 100
- Ideology: Economic nationalism Anti-Americanism; Social patriotism Agrarianism; Russophilia
- Political position: Left-wing
- Colours: Green
- Sejm: 0 / 460
- Senate: 0 / 100
- European Parliament: 0 / 51
- Regional assemblies: 0 / 552
- City presidents: 0 / 117

Website
- zs.org.pl

Slavic Union (Polish: Związek Słowiański; ZS) is a political party in Poland founded on 3 August 2006 (derived from an association of the same name founded on 6 July 2004). Its chairman was Włodzimierz Rynkowski until 2018, becoming chairman again in 2022. From 2018 the party was led by Zbigniew Adamczyk, and from December 2019 to 2022 by Karol Weiher. The party first fielded candidates in the 2006 local elections and won two seats on the municipal councils in 2010. Between 2009 and 2019, Slavic Union put forward committees three times for the European Parliament elections, but has so far failed to push through any list due to a lack of the required number of signatures. The long-standing president of the Slavic Union was Włodzimierz Rynkowski, who was replaced by Zbigniew Adamczyk in 2018.

One of the key demands in the Slavic Union's programme is the strengthening of alliances between Poland and Central and Eastern European countries. The party also advocates for leaving the European Union, strengthening defence, introducing free health care and single-mandate electoral districts. It strongly opposes the construction of a US missile shield and Poland's participation in imperial military conflicts. The party also proposes that strategic industries, banks and natural resources be owned by the state, along with free and universal healthcare and education should be free. According to the Slavic Union, Poland should not be looking for allies in the West when it has countries such as Belarus and Russia at hand and it is with them that it should strengthen cooperation.

== History ==
The party originates from the All-Slavic Council (Polish: Sobór Wszechsłowiański), which was founded in 1996 and encompassed several Polish political circles, including the one of Bolesław Tejkowski from which the Slavic Union emerged. The founders of the party recalled: "Conceptually, we started in 1999, when NATO began bombing Yugoslavia. We opposed this intervention."

Slavic Union was founded in 2004 as a public organisation, and had about 20 members. In 2006, the organisation was officially registered as a political party and reported to have about 100 active members. Most of the party's members came from nationalist and right-wing organisations, such as the national conservative League of Polish Families and left-wing nationalist Self-Defence of the Republic of Poland. Slavic Union initially cooperated with Patriotic Self-Defence, an agrarian party that split from Self-Defence.

In 2004, Slavic Union became a member of the Slavic Forum, which brought together activists from left-wing patriotic groups such as National Left Alliance (Polish: Stowarzyszenie Lewica Narodowa), National Workers' Front (Polish: Front Narodowo-Robotniczy) and the Polish Slavic Committee (Polish: Polski Komitet Słowiański). Mieczysław Kisieliński became the chairman of the organisation.

On 17 August 2005, in front of the Foreign Ministry building, the association organised a picket in support of the Belarusian authorities. In February 2007, the party organised the First All-Polish Congress of the Slavic Union in Warsaw. It was attended by 70 people, including a representative of the Embassy of Ukraine in Poland. The party thentook part in numerous pickets in front of the Sejm against plans to deploy a US missile defence shield in Poland.

In the 2005 Polish presidential election, Slavic Union, together with the rest of the Slavic Forum, endorsed Andrzej Lepper of the far-left Self-Defence of the Republic of Poland. On 16 February 2006, together with the National Workers' Front (Polish: Front Narodowo-Robotniczy), Slavic Union organized a meeting of the "patriotic left" at the University of Wrocław, where the parties decried "the sources of globalisation and capitalist exploitation".

On 15 March 2006, the party held a protest in Warsaw against the occupation of Iraq and Afghanistan and plans to install American missile defence systems on Polish territory. The protesters marched from the Presidential Palace to the Polish Sejm and the US Embassy. The protest was also attended by Polish Labour Party - August 80, Young Socialists, Labour Union, Greens 2004, Reason Party, Workers' Democracy, Federacja Anarchistyczna, Workers' Initiative, Polish Communist Party and the Polish Socialist Party.

In 2008, a new party called Patriotic Poland was found, which closely cooperated with the Slavic Union and heavily influenced its program. The ideology of Patriotic Poland was based on national syndicalism, anti-Americanism and Euroscepticism; the party also advocated for social solidarity, an economic system based on social market economy and right-wing socialism. In 2010, the vice-president of Patriotic Poland, Zdzisław Jankowski, put forward his candidacy for the presidential elections, but his candidacy was rejected by the State Electoral Commission. While remaining a leading activist of Patriotic Poland, Jankowski ran in the 2015 presidential election behalf of the Slavic Union, although he failed to collect enough signatures to register his candidacy. In 2017, Jankowski became a vice-president of the Slavic Union.

From 23 February to 1 March 2008, the party protested with the Serbian Embassy in Poland against recognition of Kosovo. On 25 March 2008, at the United States Embassy in Warsaw, the party then celebrated the 9th anniversary of NATO air strikes on Yugoslavia. In April 2008, the party also organised pickets against the ratification of the Lisbon Treaty. In August 2008, after Russia's invasion of Georgia, at the Russian Embassy in Poland, the Slavic Union organised a demonstration and concert under the slogan Solidarity with Russia.

The party cooperates with the Polish-Sorbian Association "Pro Lusatia", the Russian magazine Atenei, the Socialist Party of Serbia, the Progressive Socialist Party of Ukraine, the embassies of Russia, Belarus, China, Cuba and the DPRK in Poland, as well as with borderland and nationalist circles (e.g. Podlasie XXI Wieku and National Television).

During the Orange Revolution in Ukraine during the 2004 Ukrainian presidential election, the party congratulated Viktor Yanukovych on his victory in the presidential election. Similar congratulations were offered by the Slavic Union in the 2006 Belarusian presidential election. Alyaksandr Lukashenka, while in 2012 an application was sent to Prime Minister Donald Tusk asking him to stop his sanctions policy towards Belarus.

== Elections ==
The party took part in the 2006 Polish local elections, putting up a list for the municipal council of Olszewo-Borki - 9.13% (68) of the vote - and to the municipal council of Wrocław - 0.08% (21) of the vote. The party then participated in the early elections to the Podlaskie Voivodeship Sejmik on 20 May 2007, and did not win any seats. The party intended to run in the 2007 Polish parliamentary election, but did not register any candidate. It was also the case for the 2009 European Parliament election in Poland, where despite the registration of the committee, it failed to put forward any electoral list (Krzysztof Kononowicz). In the 2010 Polish presidential election, Slavic Union fielded the candidacy of Krzysztof Mazurski, who failed to collect 100.000 signatures and was not registered.

In the 2010 Polish local elections, Slavic Union fielded candidates in all districts for the Masovian Voivodeship Sejmik. Its list received 0.31% (5707) of the votes. In addition, Slavic Union won two seats in municipal councils. In the 2011 Polish parliamentary election, the party registered its candidate Anita Walotek in the Sosnowiec-Jaworzno district, who received 2.35% (2,977) of the vote, coming in last, 6th place. In the 2014 European Parliament election in Poland, Slavic Union again failed to field any electoral list, despite registering a committee. In the local elections in the same year, ZS fielded lists in all districts for the Mazovian Voivodeship assembly, receiving 0.37% (6621) of the vote. In addition, the party won eight seats in municipal councils. In the 2015 Polish parliamentary election, Slavic Union fielded a candidate for the Senate, Zbigniew Adamczyk, in the Grudziądz district. He received 8.96% (9562) of the vote, coming in last, 4th place. In the 2018 Polish local elections, the party registered its own committee, fielding lists in half of the districts for the Kuyavian-Pomeranian Voivodeship Sejmik. It received 0.42% of the vote (3286) on a provincial scale.

In the 2019 Polish parliamentary election in district no. 12, the party again fielded Zbigniew Adamczyk for the Senate. Vice-chairman of the ZS Zdzisław Jankowski, meanwhile, opened the Konin list of Zjednoczeni Ponad Podziałami to the Sejm (received 679 votes). Zbigniew Adamczyk in the Senate district received 6.32% (8469) of the votes, coming in penultimate, 4th place. Also, Zbigniew Adamczyk entered as a candidate in the 2020 Polish presidential election, however, he did not collect the required number of signatures, and after the vote did not take place, he did not register the committee in the second round.

On 11 August 2023, the party registered an electoral committee for the 2023 Polish parliamentary election. The party shocked the pundits by fielding controversial businessman Stanisław Tymiński as one of its two candidates for the Senate. Tymiński is a populist businessman who lived in Canada before returning to Poland and partaking in the 1990 Polish presidential election, where he shocked the media by taking second place in the first round as an "out of nowhere" dark horse candidate. Tymiński had many political labels attached to him during the election, being described as, among others, a "progressive libertarian, civilised capitalist, and ended up as a reactionary endek, Darwinist, almost (or even) fascist". Amongst media-sparked controversies such as Tymiński allegedly abusing his wife and having links to Colombian drug mafia, Tymiński lost in a landslide to Lech Wałęsa. Explaining his decision to run again after 30 years, Tymiński wrote: "For many years I have been observing how much our country has changed, which is completely dependent on foreign capital. As long as Poland's budget is kept on a drip of loans, foreign capitalists have profit. In such a situation, the only thing left is the possibility of diplomatic negotiations, because we cannot afford to fight with an open visor. And to negotiate you need the power of the electorate in the form of a large number of votes. I will be asking for such in the elections in October. Sometimes I hear opinions that nobody can change Poland. But the truth is that evil comes when good people do nothing to oppose it. You cannot be a passive observer all your life!." Ultimately Tymiński won 12.71% (18,052) of the vote in his district, failing to gain a seat. The party's other candidate, Zbigniew Adamczyk, also failed to win a seat, winning 4.78% (7750) of the district's popular vote. Political commentators expressed astonishment at Tymiński candidacy on behalf of the party, remarking that he "has thus come a long way from being a globetrotting businessman to becoming a promoter of neo-slavism."

In the 2025 Polish presidential election, the party submitted its leader, Włodzimierz Rynkowski, as the presidential candidate. His notice was accepted by the National Electoral Commission on 18 February 2025. However, in order to be included on the election ballot, a presidential candidate must gather at least 100,000 signatures by 4 April, 6 weeks before the election. it did not obtain a sufficient number of signatures. the party then supported Marek Woch, the candidate of Non-Party Local Government Official.

== Ideology ==
According to the declaration, "The Slavic Union program refers to the Manifesto of the Slavic Congress in Prague in 1848, aims to defend the rights and interests of the Polish Nation and preserve its Slavic identity." It pursues its goals through "active participation in political, social, economic and cultural life". The party opposes the deployment of a US missile shield in Poland, and sees Poland's allies mainly in Central and Eastern Europe. The party wants to radically alter the political system of Poland, wishing to introduce reforms such as liquidation of political parties due to their anti-Polish activities and majority-only elections in single-member constituencies. Slavic Union is connected to the rodzimowiercy movement in Poland, which adheres to Slavic neopaganism syncretized with Celtic and Nordic elements, along with feminist-influenced witchcraft of Wicca tradition. It opposes Polish membership in NATO and the EU, and instead speaks for closer relationship with Russia and Serbia.

The party is described as a part of the Polish patriotic left. It is associated with the National Workers' Front (Polish: Front Narodowo-Robotniczy), a left-wing nationalist party founded in 1999. It also took part in protests together with the Polish Labour Party - August 80, Young Socialists, Labour Union, Greens 2004, Reason Party, Workers' Democracy, Federacja Anarchistyczna, Workers' Initiative, Polish Communist Party and the Polish Socialist Party. Slavic Union also endorsed Andrzej Lepper of the far-left party Self-Defence of the Republic of Poland in the 2005 Polish presidential election.

In an interview with the Russian REGNUM News Agency, a representative of the party explained the party's view on Ukraine and Russia. The party accused Ukrainian immigrants and refugees of possessing anti-Polish sympathies and setting up "post-Banderite" underground organisations in Poland. The party also called for Polexit, arguing that Poland had lost its budgetary independence as "decisions in the case of our country are made outside its borders, and puppet governments only implement these decisions". Slavic Union advocates for a "pro-Polish government" that would resist the structures of the EU and implement a nationalist economic policy. The party argues that Banderism is growing in Ukraine and believes that Russia is a "natural ally" of Poland, stating: "We and the Russians are Slavs, peoples of one root, one blood".

Slavic Union demands that the name of the Euroregion Nysa be changed to Euroregion Lusatia. The party calls the referendum in Montenegro "an act of Yugoslav drama" and also protests the "germanisation" of Silesia. The party also protested against the dismissal of Professor Roman Kuźniar as director of the Polish Institute of International Affairs. The Union party Ukrainian historical policy, especially the glorification of the UPA, and accuses the Lithuanian authorities of assimilating Poles in Lithuania.

The party also made appeals to the Kresy myth, a nostalgic feeling for the Eastern Borderlands of Poland that were ceded to the USSR in 1945. Slavic Union accused the Lithuanian government of implementing Lithuanization policies and disempowering the Polish minority in Lithuania. The party organised a protest in the Vilnius region in 2012, on the first anniversary of a Lithuanian education law that limited the role of Polish language in Lithuanian schools. Party activists compared the policies of Lithuania to Prussian deportations under the German Empire and stated: "At the beginning of the twentieth century, Poles in Greater Poland resisted strongly against the Germanisation of education. Today, Greater Poland speaks Polish. We will not give up our schools. The Vilnius region will speak Polish".

In 2010, the party established cooperation with Progressive Socialist Party of Ukraine (banned in 2022); and both parties established common goals which were listed as the creation of a joint state of Russia, Belarus and Ukraine, opposition to Ukraine's accession to NATO and the EU, as well as the recognition of Russian as the second official language in Ukraine. The Slavic Union and PSPU also condemned "the glorification of OUN-UPA and Stefan Bandera". In 2011, the party also called for "a common West Slavic structure encompassing Poland, Bohemia, Slovakia and Lusatia".

For the 2015 elections, the party prepared a short program with 9 following points:

- Abolition of political parties that "conduct an anti-Polish policy, divide the nation or serve foreign interests";
- Introduction of single-mandate majority electoral system, "so that the deputy is not dependent on party discipline";
- Reforming the ballot paper to consist of three pages - one for election commissions, one for observes and one for the voter;
- Leaving the European Union: "The basic condition for Poland's sovereignty is leaving the EU empire. The losses of belonging to the EU exceed the losses of World War II and therefore Poland should be built from scratch";
- "Strategic industries, natural resources and banks must be owned by the state and give people jobs";
- Banning foreign individuals from land ownership in Poland: "The land must feed the nation and cannot pass into foreign hands, because it is Polish territory. (foreigners can only rent)";
- Isolationism: "A Polish soldier cannot take part in imperial wars and by conquering ethnically Slavic countries that are friendly to us, participate in unjust wars";
- "Healthcare must be free and compulsory education must be free";
- Securing Polish legal order and obligations in accordance with the UN Charter.

For the 2019 European Parliament election in Poland, the party registered the Electoral Committee of the Slavic Union, which included following 10 points:

- Recognition that the interest of all Poles is the basis for any policy;
- Development of cooperation between Poland and other Slavic countries;
- Complete halt to privatisation and the sale of national assets;
- Restoration of the national health service, police and judiciary;
- Reduction of bureaucracy in all state institutions and offices;
- Reducing taxes and increasing tax control over large corporations, especially foreign ones;
- Punishing fraud and extortion by companies and institutions;
- Pursuing a family-friendly policy;
- Honest presentation of historical facts in school teaching, the press and the media;
- Recognition of the Volhynian Massacre as genocide.

== Election results ==
=== Senat ===
| Election | Votes | % | Seats | Change | Government |
|---|---|---|---|---|---|
| 2011 | 2,977 | 0.02 | 0 / 100 | New | Extra-parliamentary |
| 2015 | 9,562 | 0.06 | 0 / 100 | Steady | Extra-parliamentary |
| 2019 | 8,469 | 0.05 | 0 / 100 | Steady | Extra-parliamentary |
| 2023 | 25,802 | 0.12 | 0 / 100 | Steady | Extra-parliamentary |

=== Regional assemblies ===
| Election | Votes | % | Seats | Change |
|---|---|---|---|---|
| 2010 | 5,707 | 0.04 | 0 / 561 | New |
| 2014 | 6,621 | 0.06 | 0 / 555 | Steady |
| 2018 | 3,286 | 0.02 | 0 / 552 | Steady |
| 2024 | 11,565 | 0.08 | 0 / 552 | Steady |
