= Rafał Górski =

Polish historian, political thinker

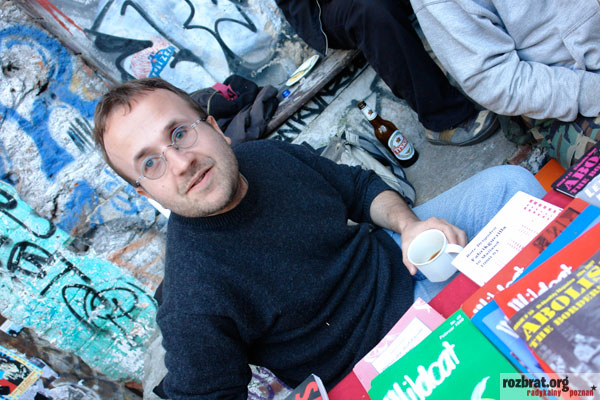
- Born: 22 September 1973; Kraków, Kraków Voivodeship, Polish People's Republic
- Died: 4 July 2010 (aged 36); Kraków, Lesser Poland Voivodeship, Third Polish Republic
- Occupations: Historian, social theorist and author
- Writing career
- Genres: World history, Western history
- Notable works: Bez państwa Polscy zamachowcy

Rafał Górski (22 September 1973 – 4 July 2010) was a Polish historian, writer, anarchist, trade union and housing activist.

Górski was the author of several books and pamphlets on self-governance and cooperation. He was considered one of the most important figures in the contemporary Polish anarchist movement.

== Personal life and activism ==
Górski was born on 22 September 1973 in Kraków. In 1988 to 1990, Górski was a member of Federation of Fighting Youth and the Youth Organization of the Confederation of Independent Poland (KPN). In mid-1989, Górski became head of the youth organization of KPN, where he remained until 1991. At the age of 16, Górski participated in the fights of the 1989 Kraków May, where youths from ZOMO fought against the election campaign of Leszek Moczulski, who ran for a mandate from the list of the Confederation of Independent Poland in the Contract elections. In 1989, Górski also took part in protests in Warsaw against the election of Wojciech Jaruzelski as President of Poland and in Kraków during protests at the Soviet consulate. He later participated in ZSMP's and PZPR's occupation of the consulate in September 1989, and December 1989, respectively, and was involved in a series of street fights in Nowa Huta at the Lenin monument. In 1990, he supported the election campaigns of KPN members to the Kraków City Council, and participated in protests at the Soviet consulate against their aggression towards Lithuania in January 1991. He also took part in the Trail of the First Cadre Company March from Kraków to Kielce.

In 1991, Górski joined the Kraków section of the Anarchist Federation, the Free Caucasus Committee, and the Committee for the Assistance and Defense of Repressed Workers. Within these organizations, he helped co-organize a number of protests, including a blockade against the construction of the Czorsztyn Dam, which resulted in a number of arrests.

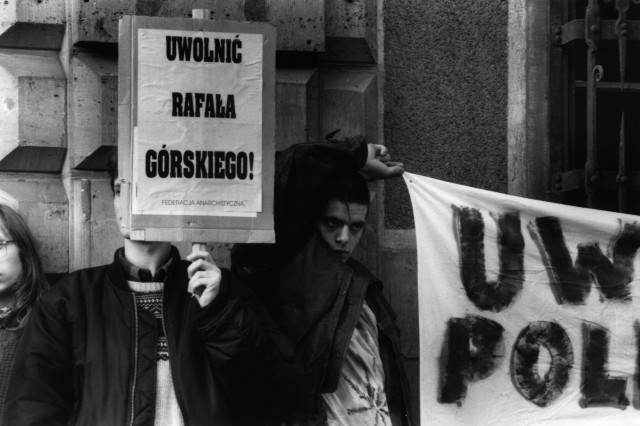
A photo from one of the many pickets to release Górski from prison

In 1995, Górski was arrested and jailed for his role in the occupation of the Delegation of the Ministry of Privatization building in Kraków and for previous charges of resisting police during the Dam Tamie in Czorsztyn, in July 1992. Anarchists and members of KPN rallied in his defence, including MP Leszek Moczulski, who issued a surety for Górski. Górski was sentenced to a fine and was released following three weeks of hunger strike while being held in custody.

On 8 February 2002, Górski was arrested on suspicion of attacking a police officer during an eviction blockade earlier that year. Anarchist organizations criticized the arrest, claiming that his detention was an attempt by police to "silence the citizens". Górski had originally planned a demonstration for the following day. Once news of his arrest reached anarchist circles, anarchists across Poland carried out "Liberate Górski" campaigns, in an effort to draw attention to his "unfounded arrest". Górski was sentenced to eight months in prison, which was later commuted to two years of probation.

Górski later served as a domestic and international delegate to the anarcho-syndicalist trade union, Workers' Initiative. He was a founder of the Multibranch Commission in Kraków, in 2008. That same year, he began working in activism for tenants living in Kraków. He founded the Sprawa Lokatorska newsletter and participated in eviction blockades.

In 2006, Górski was diagnosed with cancer. In September 2009, he was hospitalized following injuries he received in a police raid. While in the hospital his health deteriorated and he underwent two operations due to a relapse in cancer. Górski died on 4 July 2010 in Kraków, at the age of 37.

== Journalism ==
Górski published in a number of anarchist and workers rights newsletters, including Inny Świat, Mać Pariadka, Przegląd Anarchistyczny, Recykling Idei, and Trybuna Śląska. From 2000 to 2004, he co-edited the anarchist periodical A-tak. In his writings, Górski wrote predominately on the theory and practicality of Representative Democracies, the history of anarchism and syndicalism in Poland, and on the popularity of cooperatives. In 2007, he published Bez państwa. Demokracja uczestnicząca w działaniu (transl. Without the State: Democracy that participates in action), which was described by the publisher as "the answer to the crisis of liberal democracy". The book, divided into three parts, discussed the impact of representative democracy on local governments, workplaces and the judiciary. In Bez państwa, Górski discussed the difference between the theory and practice of democracy, specifically stating in the preface "many myths that have arisen around participatory democracy: that it is a beautiful system, but impossible to implement" In 2008, he published Polscy zamachowcy (transl. Polish assassins), and in 2009 he published the article A gdyby transport był bezpłatny? (transl. What if transport was free?)

== Works ==
- ABC anarchosyndykalizmu. Mielec: Wydawnictwo "Inny Świat", 1999.[wspólnie z Michałem Przyborowskim]
- Demokracja uczestnicząca w samorządzie lokalnym. Poznań: Wydawnictwo Poznańskiej Biblioteki Anarchistycznej, 2003. ISBN 83-919519-0-1.
- Przewodnik po demokracji uczestniczącej (partycypacyjnej). Poznań: Kraków : Oficyna Wydawnicza Bractwa "Trojka", 2005. ISBN 83-922180-0-0.
- Bez państwa: demokracja uczestnicząca w działaniu. Kraków: Korporacja Ha!art, 2007. ISBN 978-83-89911-76-6.
- Historia i teraźniejszość samorządności pracowniczej w Polsce. Poznań: Oficyna Bractwa "Trojka", [2007]. ISBN 978-83-7396-764-9.
- Polscy zamachowcy. Droga do wolności. Kraków: Egis Libron, 2008. ISBN 978-83-7396-764-9.

== See also ==
- Federacja Anarchistyczna
- Anarchism in Poland
