= Køpi =

Housing project in Berlin, Germany

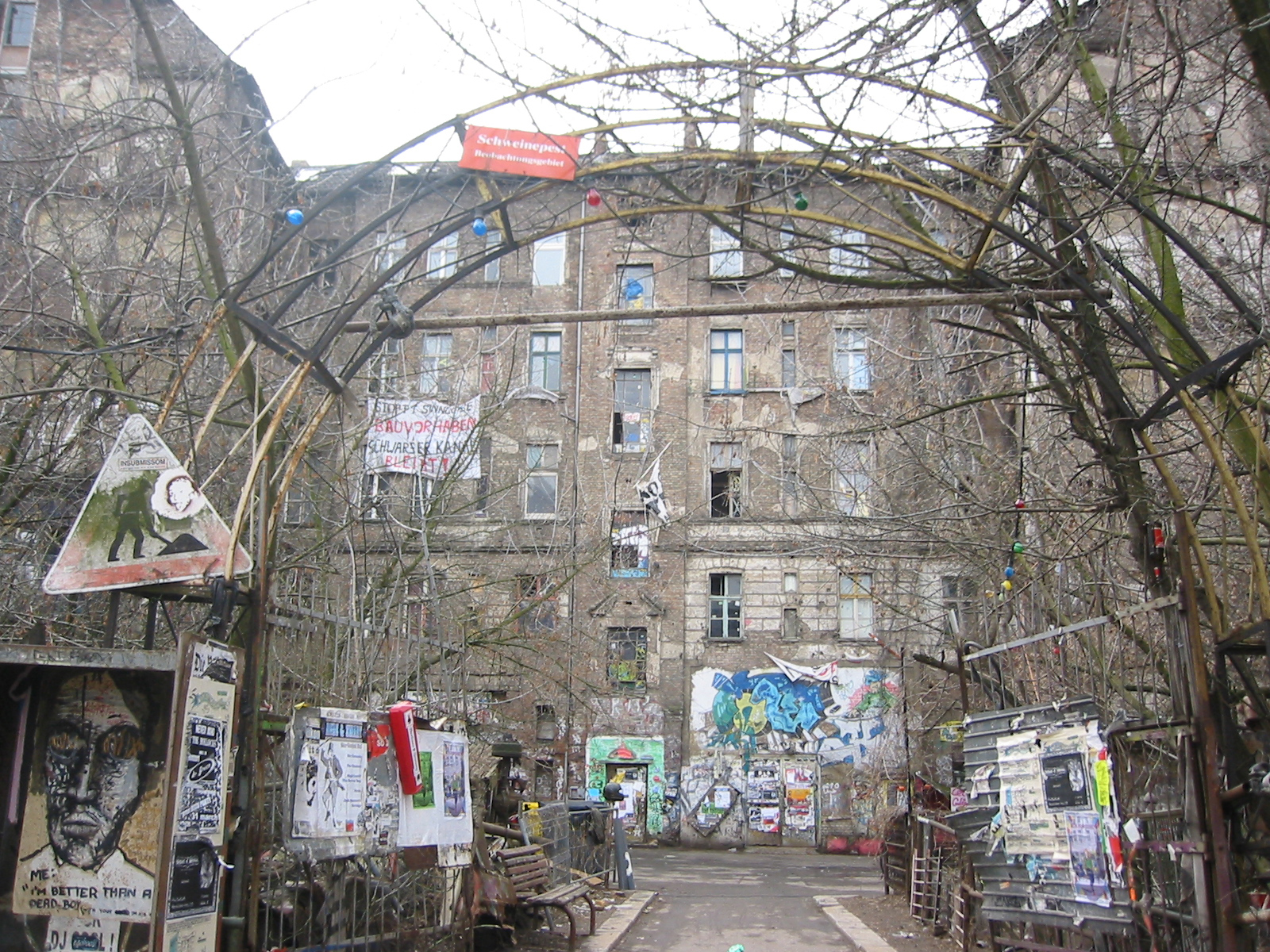
- Entrance to Køpi in 2006
- Alternative names: Köpi; Koepi

General information
- Architectural style: Gründerzeit
- Classification: Housing project Self-managed social centre
- Location: Köpenicker Straße 133, 134, 135, 136, 137, 138., Berlin, Germany
- Coordinates: 52°30′28″N 13°25′34″E
- Opened: Squatted in 1990
- Destroyed: Partially bombed in 1945

Technical details
- Floor count: 5

Køpi (also known as Köpi or Koepi) is a housing project (German: Hausprojekt) located at 137 Köpenicker Straße in Mitte, Berlin. It was squatted in 1990 and legalised in 1991 as an autonomous housing project and self-managed social centre. The yard was used as a wagenplatz for people living in vehicles, until evicted in 2021. It is a left-wing project, connected to punks, anarchists and Autonomen. The building has become a symbol for the radical left in Berlin in the same manner as Rozbrat in Poznań or Ungdomshuset in Copenhagen. It has survived several eviction attempts both through political pressure and because the developers have always run out of money.

== History of building ==
The building was constructed in 1905 by a Jewish businessman. A symmetrical Gründerzeit facade stands flanked by two short wings. What can be seen from the street used to be the back of the building, since the front half was destroyed by bombing at the end of World War II and was never rebuilt. The surfaces of the building are damaged from the bombs and subsequent neglect, with most of the stucco gone.

During World War II, the building was used by the Allgemeine Elektricitäts-Gesellschaft (the general electricity company) to house French forced labourers. After the war, the building lay in East Berlin. Under the German Democratic Republic (GDR), the building was used for sports activities and there was a bowling alley in the basement. By 1990, it had become vacant and was scheduled to be demolished.

== Occupation ==
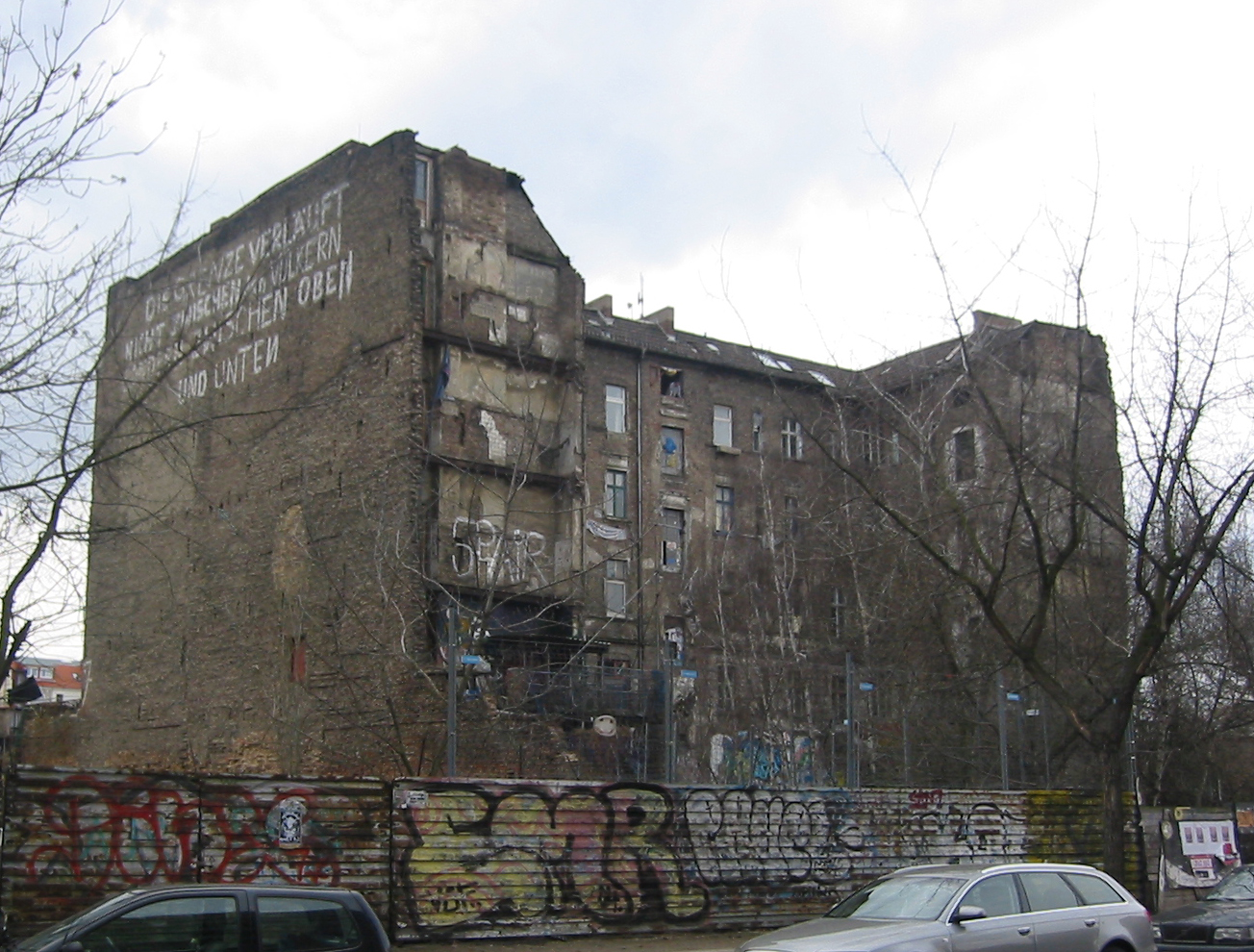
Køpi in 2006. In translation the writing on the building reads There are no borders between people, only between the top and the bottom.

Køpi was squatted on 23 February 1990 by Autonomen from West Berlin. Despite the terrible state of the building, the squatters were attracted by the large rooms. The police did not attempt to evict the occupation, which marked the first time people from West Berlin had squatted in East Berlin. The squatters legalised their occupation with the district council of Mitte in 1991.

From the very beginning, Køpi was a radical left space where anarchists, socialists, queers and musicians were welcome. The building itself is covered in banners and graffiti. It became known as Køpi because the squatters chose to use the Danish ø despite the name coming from the name of the street (Köpenicker Straße). Køpi is also spelt Koepi, Köpi and even occasionally Kopi in English or Spanish texts. Køpi has become an important symbol for the radical left in Berlin, linked to projects elsewhere such as the Ungdomshuset in Copenhagen and Rozbrat in Poznań.

== Ownership ==
The building was owned by the GDR and then by the state which succeeded it. In 1995, the government sold the building to Volquard Petersen, who wished to develop the site into the Sun Courtyards (German: Sonnenhöf). He then ran out of money and the project was shelved. Petersen fell into debt with the Commerzbank and the building was foreclosed. In 1999, the district of Mitte carried out a forced auction. The auction was unsuccessful with none of almost 30 participants offering to buy the property, which had an estimated value of 5.4 million marks. The offer of Køpi residents to buy the building for one mark was rejected, alongside their request for the terrain to be declared a 'special use site for experimental living' (German: Sondernutzungsfläche für experimentelles Wohnen).

In the meantime, the residents carried out essential repairs such as plumbing and preferred not to repair the facade, since they wanted to remember the chequered history of the building. They also carried out many political actions designed to ensure their survival in the house and this made the building unattractive to investors. For example, when another auction of the building was held in 2007, outside the courtroom there were 300 supporters of Køpi and also 300 police officers. Beforehand, the police had voiced concerns about violence, warning that the political situation was already tense after a solidarity demonstration for Ungdomshuset. The auction was this time successful, the building being sold for €835,000 (half the estimated market value) to an agent of the new owner called Besnik Fichtner, an Albanian managing director of the company Plutonium 114. He also bought two neighbouring properties for €900,000. The actual new owner was the company Novum Köpenicker Straße 133-138 GmbH. Other sources reported the new owner as the previously unknown company VKB GmbH & Co. KG. The Versicherungskammer Bayern in Münich and the Volkskreditbank in Linz were forced to deny they had anything to do with the company, despite having the same initials as it.

Køpi was immediately threatened with eviction. After one week, the Køpi residents had uncovered a paper trail leading to Berlin-based real estate developer Siegfried Nehls. They visited Nehls' parents unannounced and his father invited them to drink tea before Nehls' brother called the police. After one month, the police raided Nehls' headquarters (named as Vitalis Beteiligungsgesellschaft für Altbauten mbH) and twenty other properties, investigating financial irregularities. By 2008, Fichtner had fallen out with Nehls and signed a 30 year rental contract with the inhabitants of Køpi. There had been no actual signed agreement between Plutonium 114 and Nehls, so Fichtner was entitled to make a contract. However, Fichtner then fell into debt and Commerzbank again called for a forced auction of Køpi in 2013.

There were also several auctions related to the wagenplatz, which was not covered by the new rental agreement. An eviction order was issued for the wagenplatz alone in September 2021, informing the remaining residents that they must vacate the property by 15 October. In response, 1,000 supporters of Køpi demonstrated on 3 October and 600 emergency personnel monitored the demonstration. It was then evicted.

== Activities ==
There were 50 people living in the house in 2016 and 50 in the wagenplatz, a yard next to the house where people lived in vehicles and wagons. In addition to being a housing project, the building hosted a variety of activities, including a bar, vegan café, concert venue, cinema, infoshop, gym, printing workshop, rehearsal space and a climbing wall. The project is run by a weekly plenary which takes place on Sundays. Only inhabitants of Köpi and members of projects using the space are allowed to attend. No mobile phones are permitted.

A report by the Senate Department of Internal Affairs and the police in 2017 stated that "in general, it can be determined that the object Köpi 137 serves both as a retreat for left-motivated criminals and as a starting point for crimes." In response, a Køpi spokesperson stated that "the presence of police on our site is often met with hostility, the parking of tourist buses and structural changes in the area are perceived as an expression of gentrification processes. Displeasure about these things occasionally results in criminally relevant actions."

== See also ==
- Hafenstraße
- Kunsthaus Tacheles
- Rote Flora

== Bibliography ==
- Berg, Stefan; Rosenbach, Marcel (21 December 2007a). "Last Stand for the Far-Left: Berlin Commune Fights the Property Developers". Spiegel Online. Archived from the original on 24 December 2019.
- Berg, Stefan; Rosenbach, Marcel (21 December 2007b). "Last Stand for the Far-Left: Berlin Commune Fights the Property Developers 2". Spiegel Online. Archived from the original on 24 December 2019.
- Berg, Stefan; Rosenbach, Marcel (10 March 2008). "Häuserkampf: Die Autonomen und ihr "Plutonium"-Deal". Spiegel Online (in German). Archived from the original on 24 December 2019.
- DPA/NIC (8 May 2007). "Immobilie: "Köpi" für 834.000 Euro zwangsversteigert". Welt. Archived from the original on 24 December 2019.
- Guglielmino, Sara (16 October 2021). "Räumung des Köpi-Wagenplatzes in Berlin: Massiver Protest". Die Tageszeitung: taz (in German).
- Karlík, Tomáš (31 October 2011). "Jak se bydlí ve squatu: jedna noc v legendárním Köpi". National Geographic Česko. Archived from the original on 24 December 2019.
- Lier, Axel (24 April 2007). "Autonomentreff vor Verkauf - Gewalt erwartet". Berliner Morgenpost. Archived from the original on 30 September 2007.
- Morgenpost, Berliner (2 September 2017). "Senat: Linksextreme "Köpi 137" Ausgangspunkt von Straftaten". www.morgenpost.de (in German). Archived from the original on 24 December 2019.
- Piotrowski, Grzegorz (2011). "Squatted Social Centers in Central and Eastern Europe". ICRA Working Paper Series. 1.
- Sandler, Daniela (2016). Counterpreservation: Architectural decay in Berlin since 1989. Cornell University Press. ISBN 9781501703164.
- Zeitung, Berliner (17 February 1999). "Initiative "Köpi" kann Haus vorerst behalten". BZ. Archived from the original on 24 September 2015.
