= History of trade unions in Poland =

- National organization(s): FZZ, NSZZ, OPZZ, OZZIP
- Regulatory authority: Ministry of Family, Labour and Social Policy

International Labour Organization
- Poland is a member of the ILO

Convention ratification
- Freedom of Association: 25 February 1957
- Right to Organise: 25 February 1957

The history of trade unions in Poland began with the formation of the Trade Union of Mechanical Engineers and Metal Workers in 1869. By 1906, there were over 2,000 trade unions nationally, and many divisions among them.

All trade unions were suspended starting in 1939 with the German invasion of Poland and remained prohibited for the duration of Nazi control. Many labor activists were killed by the Nazi party, either in violent clashes with soldiers or after deportation to concentration camps.

After the end of the war, unions were reformed and incorporated into the newly-established communist leadership. Many union members opposed state control and wanted to remain autonomous, leading to violent clashes between union members and the government. The All-Poland Alliance of Trade Unions (OPZZ) was established by the state as an umbrella organization for all workers.

The OPZZ continued to operate after the fall of the communist government and remains the largest trade union in Poland, though its membership numbers have dropped significantly from their peak in the late 1980s.

== The first 120 years 1869–1989 ==
As in all countries of Central Europe also in Poland trade unions were active since the end of the 19th century, particularly in the Prussian and Austrian partition regions. 1869 the first Trade Union (of a branch) of Mechanical Engineers and Metal Workers in Bromberg. In 1889 the first general 'Union of Mutual Help' (ZWP) was founded in the town of Bytom (Beuthen) in Silesia. Some of the historical trade unions maneuvered their way through all system changes, for example today's biggest affiliated union of the country, namely the Polish Teachers' Union (ZNP) which was established in 1905. Around 1906 there were already over 2000 trade unions gathered in about 30 central associations. Much of the trade union movement was ideologically divided.

After the German invasion of Poland on 1 September 1939 all socio-political organisations, including trade unions, were prohibited by the German occupying forces. Many activists were deported to concentration camps and murdered, others died in the resistance movement. After 1945 the communist system forced all refounded trade unions into line. Regime trade unions became the fundamental element of workers' organisations, which was also aimed at preventing solidarity in state combines and regions. The aim was to make unions an instrument of the Polish United Workers' Party (PZPR). However, this repeatedly met with violent resistance of the workers in the industrial centres, like in Poznań in 1956, in the northern coastal cities in 1970, in Radom and Ursus in 1976 as well as at the Lenin Shipyard in Gdańsk in 1980. The most significant result was the foundation of the Independent Self- governing Trade Union ‘Solidarity’(NSZZ Solidarnosc) in August 1980, a mass organisation with almost 10 million members. This led in autumn 1980 to the self-dissolution of the Association of Trade Unions (ZZZ) which was subordinated to the PZPR. During Martial Law, which was introduced on 13 December 1981 and lasted until June 1983, Solidarnosc was banned and the controlled refoundation of trade unions dependent on state orders began. In establishments and state combines affiliated unions were founded. Only in 1984 the 'All-Poland Alliance of Trade Unions' (OPZZ) was set up as an umbrella organisation to coordinate them. The OPZZ received not only all properties of the CRZZ, but also of the banned Solidarnosc.

== Development of trade unions and membership after 1989 ==
After the regime changes of the year 1989 OPZZ remained the strongest trade union federation, but like all other trade unions it recorded a dramatical decrease in membership. While in the middle of the nineties about 4.5 million people were members of OPZZ, this number fell to under 2 million by the year 2001 and it is estimated that in 2007 there were less than 750.000 members. At the beginning of 2002 a new trade union federation split away from OPZZ, namely the Trade Unions Forum (FZZ) with 515.000 members mainly from civil service, local governments, railways, energy, mines and other state-owned enterprises. In autumn 1981 ten million people belonged to NSZZ Solidarnosc, but after its second legalization in April 1989 it did not manage to regain its previous significance and number of members. While in 2001 there still were about 1.1 million members, in December 2005 there were only 721.8561. At the same time there are drastic differences between state enterprises and civil service, where about 28 per cent of employees belong to trade unions, and the private sector, where only 3 per cent are organised in trade unions2. From 1982 until 2005 the overall degree of unionization fell from 80 per cent to below 14 per cent. This dramatic decline lead to Poland being one of the EU-countries with the lowest degree of unionization. Most of the trade unions' members (51.7 per cent) are women, especially in the educational sector, health and civil services, but also 35 per cent of members of mining trade unions are female. Only 2.4 per cent of employees under the age of 25 belong to a trade union.

1 Report of the 20th national congress of NSZZ Solidarnosc, 28–20 September 2006, p. 33

2 Public Opinion Research Center CBOS, Polish Public Opinion, 11/2006, p. 4

3 Juliusz Gardawski, Declining trade union density examined, 'Foundation Institute of Public Affairs', Warsaw 2002, published in 'Eiro-Portal' (European Industrial Relations Observatory on-line).

4 Juliusz Gardawski, Declining trade union density examined, 'Foundation Institute of Public Affairs', Warsaw 2002, published in 'Eiro-Portal' (European Industrial Relations Observatory on-line).

The reasons for this rapid deterioration are essentially as follows4:

- massive shrinkage of traditional industries and sectors, such as mining and steel,

- in privatised establishments ("brownfield investment") with over 250 employees trade unions mostly remained, in mid-sized establishments about one third remained. In small establishments there are almost no trade unions,

- new private enterprises ("greenfield investments"): among big enterprises only 5 per cent of Polish establishments and 33 per cent of foreign establishments have trade unions, in mid-sized and small establishments there are practically no trade unions,

- technology-orientated undertakings like those in the IT-branch with their young staff, who often have academic degrees, have almost no unionization,

- due to high unemployment, which in some regions reaches 30 per cent and in the whole country 12 per cent (November 2007), many employees are afraid of founding or joining a trade union.

== The role of trade unions in Polish politics after the transformation 1989 ==
From its beginning in August 1980 Solidarność was not only a trade union but also a political movement. Many later political groupings and parties stem from this environment. All in all 23 political parties had their roots and leaders linked to Solidarność, amongst them today's biggest governing party ‘Civic Platform’ (PO) and the biggest opposition party ‘Law and Justice’ (PiS). Although the relations between political parties and trade unions used to be close, this decreased after 2000, but is still visible. Solidarność sympathises with the conservative parties of the national catholic right-wing, whereas OPZZ tends towards alliances with the post-communist Left.

During the transformation period national trade unions were highly politicised. Lech Wałęsa, the first chairman of Solidarność became president of Poland in 1990 and many trade union members held government offices and seats in Parliament and on management boards of big state-owned companies. As a result, Solidarność gained enormous influence, but as a trade union simultaneously lost most of its leaders to politics. This led to a loss of authority of Solidarność as an institution representing workers' interests and separated it away from its grass roots members.

In the parliamentary elections in 1997 one of the parties running for parliament was the Solidarity Electoral Action (AWS), a political party coalition gathered around Solidarność. It consisted of 20 small parties and 16 further groupings. AWS became by far the biggest party with almost 34 per cent of valid votes and gained 201 seats in the Sejm (out of 460), as well as 51 out of 100 seats in the Senate and thus had the absolute majority in the second chamber of the Polish parliament. Prime Minister Jerzy Buzek as well as most of the AWS ministers came from the trade union. The trade union's chairman Marian Krzaklewski (from February 1991 until September 2002) was simultaneously chairman of the AWS and its parliamentary grouping in the Sejm. His most important collaborators came from the trade union's National Commission and took part in negotiations even when they were not members of parliament. Consequently, Krzaklewski – as chairman of the trade union, of the party and of the parliamentary grouping – and the members of the trade union's National Commission became an extra-parliamentary centre of influence.

The 'rule of trade unions' ended in the year 2001. Due to conflicts within the party and accusations of corruption AWS became unattractive and weak in the eyes of the electorate. In the parliamentary elections of 2001 it did not manage to get over the legal hurdle of 8 per cent of votes for electoral coalitions and since then has not had a single parliamentarian in the Sejm. Now came the time of the coalition of the Left led by the 'Democratic Left Alliance' (SLD), where many parliamentarians came from OPZZ. In 2005 'Law and Justice', a party very near to Solidarność, and its partners removed the Left Alliance which was related to OPZZ. After the September 2005 and October 2007 elections seven parliamentarians from the OPZZ still belonged to left alliances.

The structural reforms of the nineties lead to the impoverishment of certain parts of the society, to dismissals and growing unemployment, for which not only the government but also the trade unions were blamed. Their direct engagement in Polish politics had produced negative effects. Due to their participation in less than pristine governments trade unions almost forfeited their reputation and support. Nevertheless, a large part of the leaders and members believe until today that in order to achieve something in politics one has to use one's own people. The trade union Solidarność openly favours the 'Law and Justice' party PiS. During the presidential elections in 2005 it intensively called on the electorate to vote for PiS candidate Lech Kaczyński. The weekly newspaper 'Tygodnik Solidarność' constantly supported the policy of PiS which governed from 2005 to 2007 with the rural interest party Self-Defence of the Republic of Poland (Samoobrona) and the extreme right-wing League of Polish Families (LPR).

Even the hitherto neutral FZZ was close to getting involved with political parties. In June 2005 its board decided to sign an agreement with the populist Samoobrona. However, already in August 2005 FZZ annulled this agreement, because Samoobrona did not grant FZZ the promised places on the electoral lists for the parliamentary elections in 2005.

== Current situation of Polish trade unions ==
The landscape of Polish trade unions is shaped by three national umbrella organisations, many autonomous organisations on the local level (i.e. 'Sierpien 80', Solidarnosc 80, etc.) as well as independent trade unions in individual plants and firms. All Polish trade unions accept the social market economy, parliamentary democracy and European unification.

All trade unions, including NSZZ Solidarnosc, used their old structures to deal with new tasks and challenges during the transformation period after 1989. Despite numerous attempts at reforms all umbrella organisations, as well as most sector unions, suffer because of these dysfunctional structures. Reform of structures has become a magic formula present at all congresses and in programmatic documents in many variations, but that does not result in any significant changes. Although they support political reforms, trade unions are conservative and resistant to reform when it comes to their own organisational structures and finances. The structure of the sector organisations reflects the Polish state-owned economic structures from the beginning of the eighties and not the realities of today's globalised market economy and precarious labour markets. The borders of local structures often do not follow the local government reorganisations which have taken place in the meantime.

NSZZ Solidarnosc, founded in 1980 and again in 1989, consists of 37 regions and 16 affiliated sectoral unions. Since September 2002 its leader is Janusz Sniadek. OPZZ was established in 1984 and consists of 90 craft unions grouped in 9 sector committees and of 16 regional boards in voivodeships. Since May 2004 its leader is Jan Guz. FZZ Forum was established in 2002, consists of 77 craft unions grouped in 8 branches and is led by Wieslaw Siewierski.

The Catholic Church and particularly the admiration of the Polish pope John Paul II. have profoundly shaped NSZZ Solidarnosc. During the 20th National Congress of Solidarnosc in summer 2006 typically there was an appeal in memory of pope John Paul II. During the first visit of pope Benedict XVI strikes in health care and in other sectors in the whole country were stopped in order not to disturb the distinguished guest and to enable members of the Solidarnosc to participate in the services with the pope.

NSZZ Solidarnosc, OPZZ and FZZ Forum together have about 1.9 million members. It is supposed that a further 200.000 members belong to small independent trade unions. Statistics are rarely published and are extremely difficult to prepare anyway, due to the huge fragmentation and insufficient links between organisational levels. The overwhelming part of the basic trade unions are 'plant social clubs' or even 'functional groups' for administration, sales, logistics, foremen, technicians, etc. Some of those 'plant social clubs' function only in their own departments or sites and know only little about trade union work in other locations of the enterprise. Cooperation in trade union networks for entire enterprises and groups of companies is only an exception and takes place with foreign, often German help. The EU- inspired Law on Information and Consultation, passed on 7 April 2006, slowly contributes to changing this situation by means of the creation of "Employees Councils".

The degree of unionization is still exceptionally high in the mining industry, in the metallurgical industry, the railways and in education. Trade unions are present in all state owned mines. Apart from two large trade mining unions affiliated to Solidarnosc and OPZZ, there are independent unions of occupational groups. The degree of unionisation depends on the mine and lies between 70 and 90 per cent.

However, in 97 per cent of all establishments in the country there are no trade unions, especially not in small and mid-sized enterprises (SMEs). On the other hand, in the business segment where there are employees' organisations there are over 23.000 trade unions as legal entities and over 300 industry-wide organisations which aspire to be national confederations of trade unions. All of them are properly registered with the courts. Individual membership in sector unions or nationwide confederations do not exist. The reason for this multitude and variety is a law which imposes only a few numerical limits to the establishment of employee organisations. It takes only 10 employees to register a trade union foundation committee. Enterprises with over five or even over a dozen trade unions are not rare. The record belongs to an establishment with 210 employees and 17 trade unions. Within many firms trade unions cooperate between themselves. Yet it also happens that unions negotiate and sign collective agreements with the employer behind each other's backs. Even many of the enterprise unions of Solidarnosc do not at the same time belong to sector or craft unions but only to the nationwide association.

Trade unions, if they exist, are generally strongest on the plant or site level where the collection of membership dues takes place. The majority of union funds is also spent on this level. The most transparent finances are those of Solidarnosc. Membership subscriptions are distributed as follows: 60 per cent go to the Plant/Site Commission, 25 per cent to the Regional Board, 8 per cent to the National Commission (umbrella organisation), 5 per cent to the strike fund and 2 per cent to the sector union. OPZZ and FZZ Forum also have great problems with financing their activities. In both cases a part of subscriptions of 7-cent per month and member goes to central offices. This is by far not enough to keep the work of the umbrella organisations on a sufficiently high level. During the last few years especially Solidarnosc and OPZZ were forced to cut down on costs by closing offices and reducing staff. OPZZ seems to be in a better material situation than Solidarnosc, as it took over the larger part of the properties of trade unions dating from before 1989 (urban office properties, sanatoriums and holiday homes) and thus for years functioned on the basis of earnings from renting and leasing them. Some affiliated unions of OPZZ and Forum have similar financial sources as they have their own properties.

Until now the cooperation between trade unions and organisations of civil society was somewhat limited. The generally conservative trade unions are often wary or even mistrustful towards consumer or environmental organisations which follow other aims and sometimes represent contradictory interests. Polish trade unions are also often unable to react to new challenges in good time. Other non-governmental organisations usually react quicker. Some important phenomena of today's labour market like gender questions, mobbing, interest protection of employees mistreated in big chain stores, temporary work or subcontracted labour became topics of the public debate thanks to civil society, the media and ad hoc socio- political associations. Trade unions initially often showed reserve towards new challenges, and they don't represent the precariously employed and the unemployed anyway.

Employee councils were established for the first time by the act of 7 April 2006. This act is the implementation of the EU directive establishing a general framework for informing and consulting employees of 11 March 2002. The new employee councils have no rights of co- determination of decisions of management. Where there are no trade unions employee councils may become a preliminary stage to the establishment of trade union organisations in the firms.

== International connections of the Polish trade unions ==
Since 1986 the NSZZ Solidarnosc belonged to the International Confederation of Free Trade Unions (ICFTU, since November 2006 ITUC) and to the World Confederation of Labour (WCL, which in November 2006 became a part of the ITUC), since 1995 to the European Trade Union Confederation (ETUC), and since 1997 to the Trade Union Advisory Committee of the 'Organisation for Economic Cooperation and Development' (TUAC/OECD). The affiliated unions of the NSZZ Solidarnosc usually belong to the branch offices of the ETUC.

OPZZ belonged from 1984 till 1991 to the communist-dominated World Federation of Trade Unions (WFTU) in Prague. From 1991 till 1997 OPZZ reduced its status to observer. In March 2006 it joined the European Trade Union Confederation after the long-standing quarrel with Solidarnosc concerning real estate was settled. The biggest trade union in the country, the OPZZ member ZNP, belonged to the teachers' federations of the ICFTU as well as of the WCL. Many other affiliated unions of the OPZZ also belong to the sector branch structures of the ETUC and the ITUC for a long time. Among these are printers, the building branch, forestry, agriculture, mining, chemistry, energy and some public services.

Since September 2003 the FZZ Forum is a member of the Confederation of Free Trade Unions (Federation of Civil Servants CESI).
