= Polish anarchy =

Polish anarchy can refer to:

- Anarchism in Poland
- the inefficient government of the late 17th / early 18th century Polish–Lithuanian Commonwealth (see Golden Liberty, liberum veto)
