= FMW (disambiguation) =

FMW may refer to:

- Frontier Martial-Arts Wrestling, a Japanese professional wrestling promotion
- Fusion Middleware, a software package from Oracle Corporation
- Federation of Fighting Youth (Polish: Federacja Młodzieży Walczącej), a radical anticommunist organization of Polish youth
