= People's Liberation Front (Poland) =

Polish anarchist group

- Ludowy Front Wyzwolenia
- Leader: Piotr Ratyński
- Dates active: 1989–1991
- Country: Poland
- Ideology: Anarchism

The People's Liberation Front (Polish: Ludowy Front Wyzwolenia, LFW) was a Polish anarchist group founded in 1989. The name of the organization refers to the Popular Front for the Liberation of Palestine. Its participants were recruited from various anti-communist and anarchist organizations, such as the Anarchist Federation (formerly the Alternative Society Movement) and Fighting Solidarity. The Gdańsk branch of the LFW (there was also a group operating in Grudziądz) operated until 1991 and carried out several actions aimed at various spheres of state activity and attacks on the embassies of the USSR and Israel. After the arrest and sentencing of the leader of the group, Piotr Ratyński, to two and a half years in prison, the LFW ceased its activity.

== See also ==
- Anarchism in Poland
