= Anarchism in Poland =

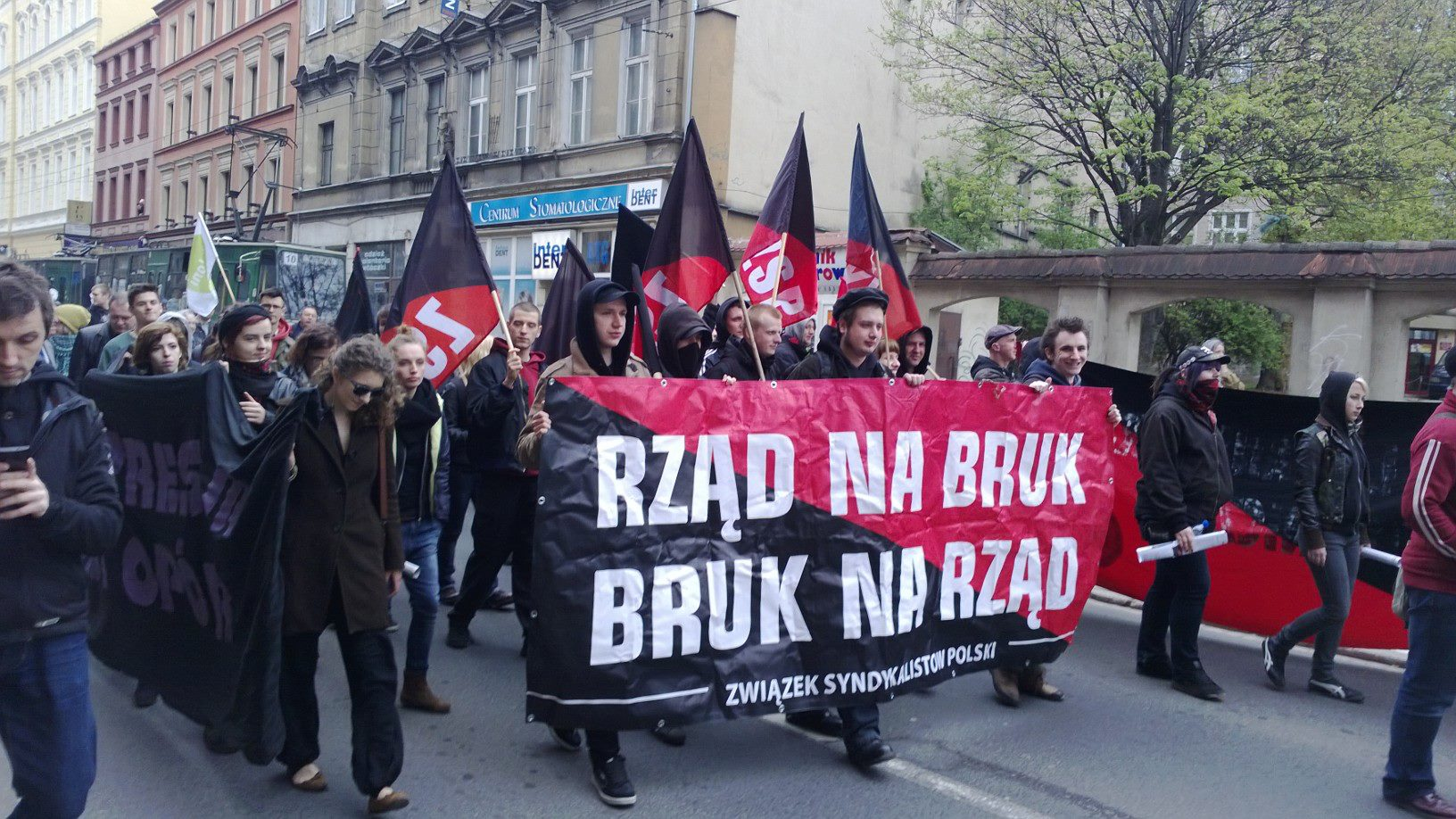
Anarchist block during Workers Day demonstration in Wrocław, 2013

Anarchism in Poland first developed at the turn of the 20th century under the influence of anarchist ideas from Western Europe and from Russia.

Prior to Polish independence from the Russian Empire, several anarchist organizations emerged within the area that would become the Second Polish Republic. The first of these, known as "The Struggle", formed in Białystok in 1903. In the following years similar organizations established themselves in Gniezno, Warsaw, Łódź, Siedlce, Częstochowa, Kielce, and other towns. One of the most active, a group known as "International", had its base in Warsaw. This group, composed of Jewish workers, organized strikes throughout the city during the Polish insurrection of 1905.

The tsarist régime (which controlled much of Poland before 1914) acted with a high level of despotism. The authorities commonly fired on demonstrating workers. In January 1906 the authorities arrested sixteen members of the International group and shot them without trial.

Significant Polish theorists of anarchism and anarcho-syndicalism included Edward Abramowski (1868–1918), Jan Wacław Machajski (1866–1926), Augustyn Wróblewski (1866–1923) and Rafał Górski (1973–2010).

== History ==
=== Anarchist movement during the partitions ===
The pioneers of the Polish anarchist movement were the movement of Polish Brethren, active in the 16th century. It was one of the Protestant currents with a clearly anti-state, anti-war and communist attitude. Among the Brethren, there were representatives of commoners, bourgeoisie and nobility. They professed the principle of brotherhood of all people. They refused military and state service, condemned the death penalty, and rejected the possibility of having landed estates benefiting from the serfdom of peasants.

The beginnings of the Polish anarchist movement can also be traced to the circles of the nineteenth century radical democracy. It leaned towards the idea of communal administration, and thus the self-government of communes, combining democratic freedom and equality with a strong moral bond. Joachim Lelewel, for example, referred to the rules of communal administration. The Polish Democratic Society also referred to this idea. The development of the theory of communal rule was influenced by contacts with European anarchism. Although Polish democrats were not too interested in Proudhon's works, the views of the Pan-Slavist Mikhail Bakunin were warmly received. Many Polish emigrants ended up in the Bakuninian Society of International Brothers. Polish supporters of anarchism tried to combine the traditions of the commune with new forms of action, like strikes.

In 1864 the Polish Republican Center was established. It was founded by Józef Hauke-Bosak, Ludwik Bulewski and Leon Zienkowicz. It was the Polish section of the Universal Republican Alliance, created by Giuseppe Mazzini.

In each of the partitions, anarchism took a slightly different shape. In the fairly liberal Austrian Partition, where reformist tendencies prevailed, anarcho-syndicalism was the most popular among anarchists. The situation was different in the Russian Partition, where only a revolutionary struggle was possible. In the Prussian Partition, the socialist movement, and thus anarchism, could count on little support.

Daniel Grinberg points out that the first Polish group known by name to refer to anarchism was the Polish Social-Revolutionary Society, operating in 1872 among Polish emigrants in Zürich. Influenced by Bakunin, it adopted an anarchist agenda. However, when Józef Tokarzewicz joined the organization, he created a new program, the idea of the stateless nature of the future Polish society, present in the Bakuninist version, was abandoned.

Another anarchist organization was Free Brethren. This group functioned in 1897 in Galicia, among teachers and junior high school students from Kraków. Its program, apart from anarchist ideas, also contained folk and national-democratic themes. The Free Brethren approved of individual terror.

In 1903, an anarchist group called Walka was established in Białystok on the initiative of Jewish weavers. Combat activists established contact with the circles of the Russian organization Land and Liberty and Western anarchist groups organizing the transfer of instructional materials, money and weapons. The fight practiced economic terror and agitated among the unemployed in the Białystok region. The biggest actions of the conflict were: the successful attack on the district office in Krynki, where the anarchists managed to obtain large amounts of passport forms; shooting the chief of the Białystok police; an attempt to assassinate the scab-employing factory owner Kogan in 1904.

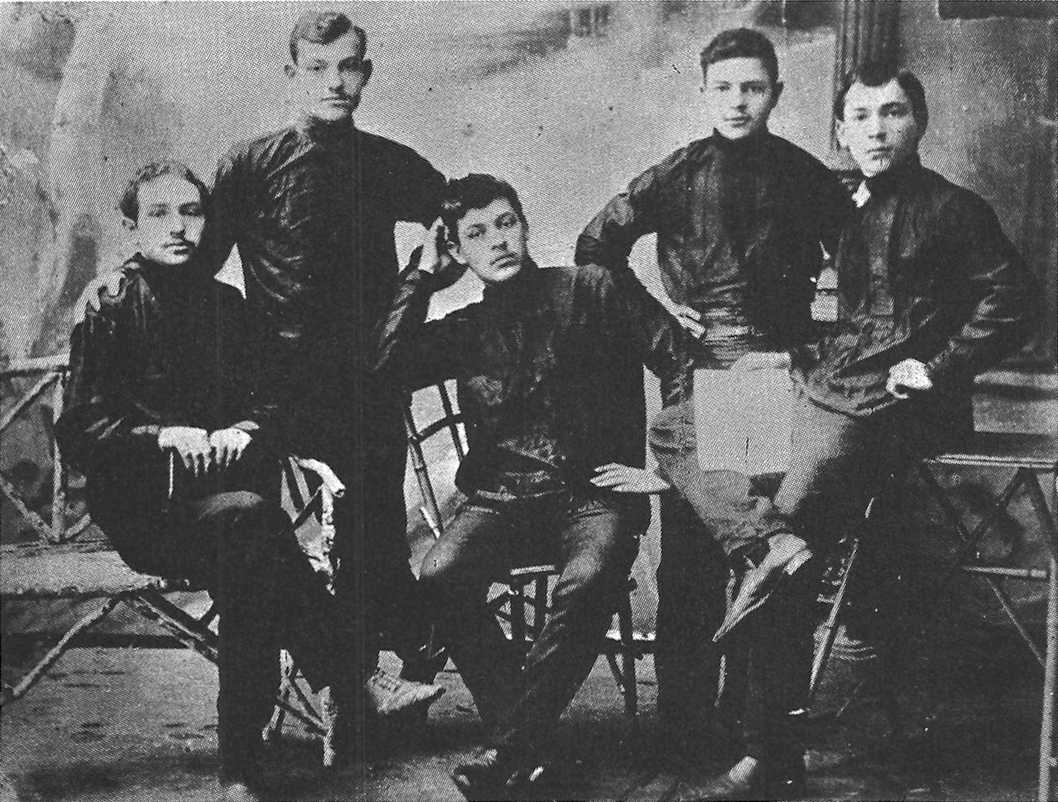
Meeting of the Black Banner (1906)

With the outbreak of the 1905 Russian Revolution, new anarchist groups began to appear in Poland. That same year, an anarcho-communist organization called the Black Banner was founded in Białystok by Juda Grossman-Roszczin. According to some estimates, the Black Banner groups in Białystok alone numbered around 500 people. In 1906, they created a strong federation that included Polish and Jewish weavers, tanners, furriers, tailors and carpenters. The Black Knights – as they were also called – advocated economic terror, and above all a so-called unmotivated terror directed at all representatives of the bourgeoisie. The Black Banner was also active, for example, in Vilnius.

In 1905, a group of about 120 people called the International was active in Warsaw. This organization announced a manifesto calling for a general strike, conducted agitation among Warsaw workers, organized sabotage, set bakeries on fire and distributed bread to the poorest. In the same year, there was also the Warsaw Anarchist-Communist Group "Internacyjnyał", which carried out bomb attacks and extorted money from wealthy entrepreneurs. The "Internacyjnyał" group also carried out a lively propaganda activity. One of its appeals read:

Forward brothers, for the great struggle of which all tyrants so fear, forward for anarchist communism and social revolution! Death to tyrants and the bourgeoisie! Death to multiple owners and dictators! Down with private property and its defenders Democrats! Long live the solidarity of the class struggle of the proletariat! Long live the social revolution! Long live anarchist communism!

— Our fight is hard, but it is fruitful – the appeal of the "International" group of October 1905, [in:] Appeals and proclamations of Polish anarchist groups

The former socialist Augustyn Wróblewski was active in the Austrian Partition. He created a group in Kraków, the press body of which was the anarcho-syndicalist magazine "Sprawa Robotnicza". The Galician anarcho-syndicalist movement, however, never developed significantly.

While groups operating in Poland were often inclined towards terror, Polish thinkers associated with anarchism were rather in favor of peaceful and more constructive solutions. Apart from Machajski, who "was a rebellious Marxist rather than an anarchist in the strict sense", mention should be made of Edward Abramowski, Augustyn Wróblewski and Józef Zieliński.

=== The anarchist movement in the Second Polish Republic ===
With Poland regaining independence, which was largely the work of the socialists, anarchists found themselves in a difficult situation. The joint opposition of anarchists and communists to the policy of the socialists and Piłsudski pushed both groups together. However, when the anarchist movement diverged from the Third International, Polish anarchist groups also severed contacts with the Communist Party. The anarchists were the only leftist group to condemn the May Coup, and each government after 1926 was labeled as fascist.

In 1926 the Anarchist Federation of Poland (AFP) was established. This organization was active in the underground until the outbreak of World War II, because the mere promotion of anarchism was punished with a prison sentence of several years. AFP was created by a group of Zionist youth that joined a group of Warsaw wood workers who previously belonged to the Social Democracy of the Kingdom of Poland and Lithuania. The organization worked, among others in Warsaw, Łódź, Kraków, Częstochowa and Tarnów. AFP took part in strikes and demonstrations. Initially it published "Głos Anarchisty", and from 1931 "The Class Struggle".

Due to repression there was also political emigration. In 1923, a group of anarchists emigrated to Paris, where they founded the Group of Polish Anarchists in France and the publishing house "Nowa Epoka", publishing anarchist authors, including Rudolf Rocker and Alexander Berkman. The published texts were then smuggled to Poland.

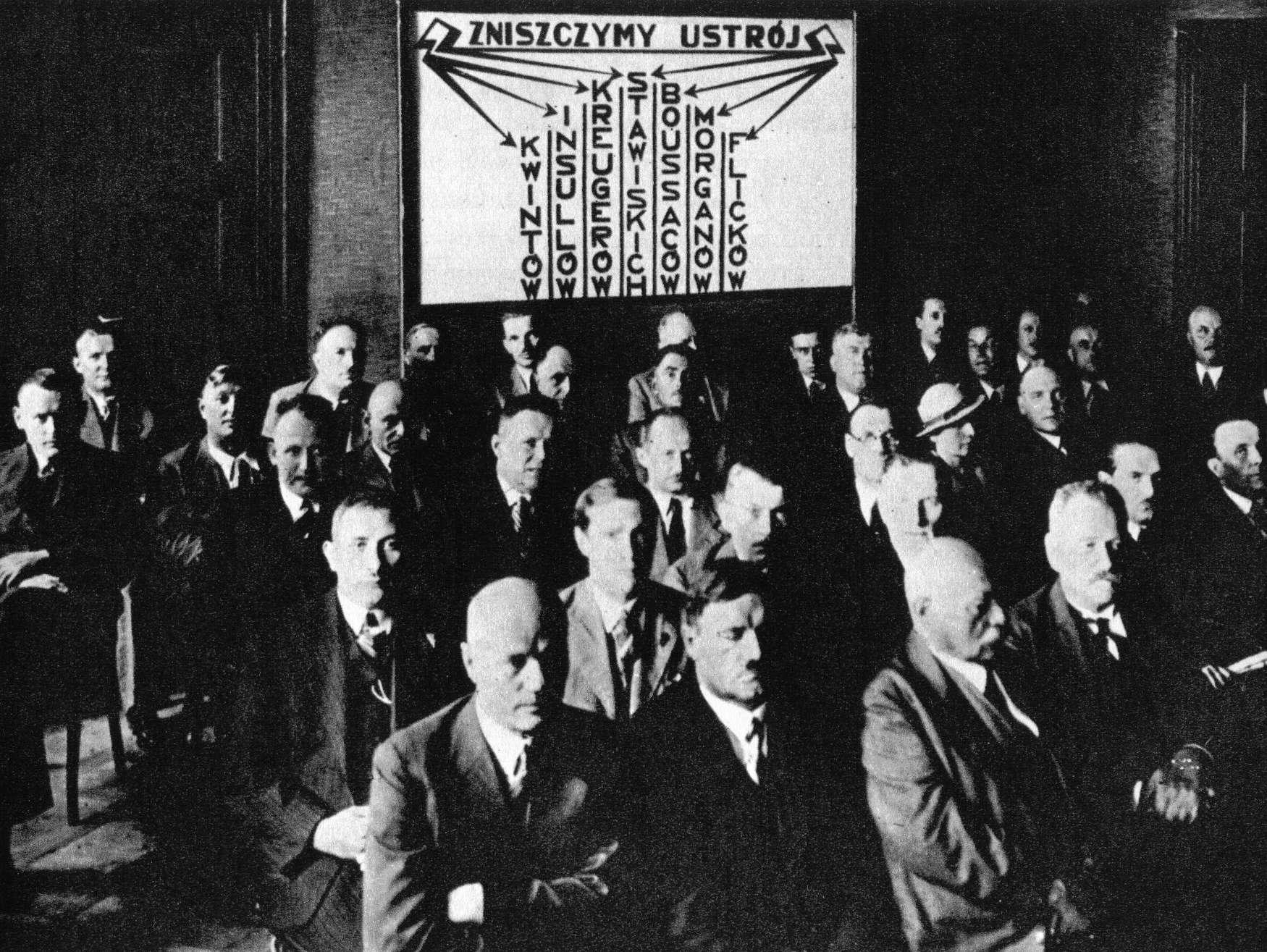
Meeting of the ZZZ in 1935

The Union of Trade Unions (Polish: Związek Związków Zawodowych, ZZZ) was established in May 1931 as a result of an attempt to unite pro-social trade unions. It operated until 1939 and was one of the three largest union centers in the country. It was pro-government at first, but under the influence of anarchists, it began to lean towards radical syndicalism from 1936 onward. Soon it became the target of police and judicial repression, and their efforts were finally interrupted by the outbreak of World War II. The main anarchist activist in ZZZ was Tomasz Pilarski.

In October 1939 the Union of Polish Syndicalists (Polish: Związek Syndykalistów Polskich, ZSP) was established in Warsaw. In 1939 it operated under the name of the "Freedom and People" Union. The ZSP disregarded anarchism and represented the so-called "Polish version of syndicalism" – it accepted the institution of the socialized state. The organization conducted self-help, publishing and military activities. The ZSP units such as the 104th Company of Syndicalists fought in the Warsaw Uprising, in the Kampinos Forest, in the Magnuszew region and in the Sandomierz–Opatów region. ZSP co-founded the Żegota Council to Aid Jews. The last meeting of the ZSP leadership was held in January 1945 in Brwinów near Warsaw. In 1940, the Syndicalist Organization "Freedom" (Polish: Syndykalistyczna Organizacja "Wolność", SOW) was established in Warsaw. It was created on the basis of anarcho-syndicalists from ZZZ and part of the Union of Polish Democratic Youth.

In 1941 the Polish Union for the Fight for the Freedom of Nations (Note: The Polish Union for the Struggle for Freedom of Nations was established in December 1939 in Kielce. It was an internationalist and anarcho-syndicalist organization.) joined the SOW. SOW criticized the so-called "Polish version of syndicalism" promoted by the ZSP. The Syndicalist Organization "Freedom" advocated the creation of a Social Republic – a grassroots federation of workers and local self-governments. SOW was active in Warsaw, Ursus, Kielce, Skarżysko, Jędrzejów and Kraków. The organization ceased its activity after the fall of the Warsaw Uprising. The pre-war activists of the AFP cooperated with the SOW: Paweł Lew Marek, Bernard Konrad Świerczyński, Stefan Julian Rosłoniec.

=== 1945–1980 ===
After the end of World War II, the AFP was reactivated under the name of the Federation of Polish Anarcho-syndicalists (Polish: Federacja Polskich Anarchosyndykalistów, FPAS). However, this organization disbanded in the early 1950s. In 1946, the publishing co-operative "Word" was founded in Łódź by anarchists. Due to the liquidation of the independent cooperative movement by the communist party, it ceased its activities on 1 September 1949.

Anarchism had its supporters in Poland also in the 1960s. Anarchist themes were present mainly in the artistic environment – for example in the activities of Henryk Stażewski, Akademia Ruchu, and the 8 Day Theater.

=== Anarchism after 1980 ===
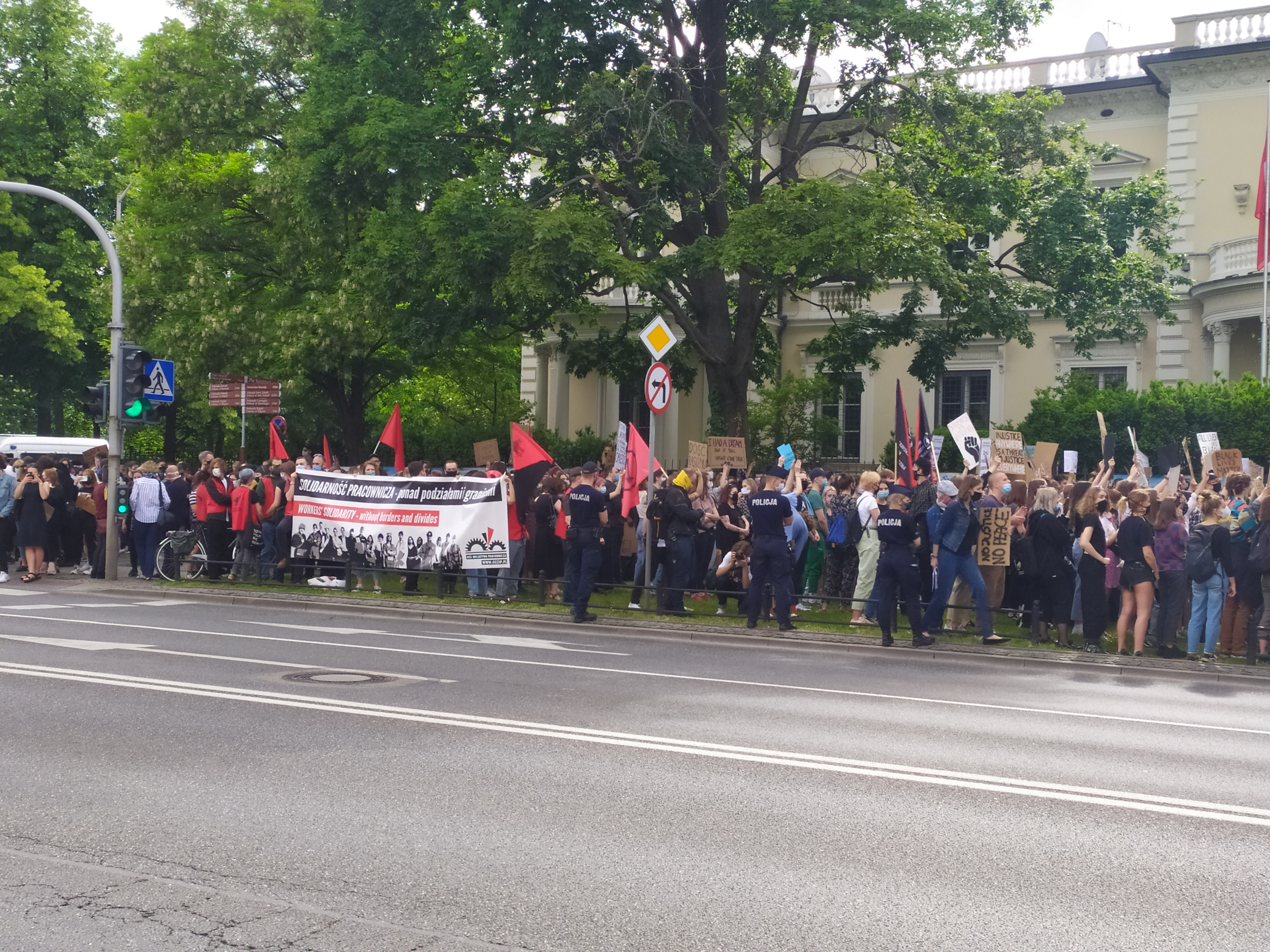
Banner of Inicjatywa Pracownicza during a protest (2020)

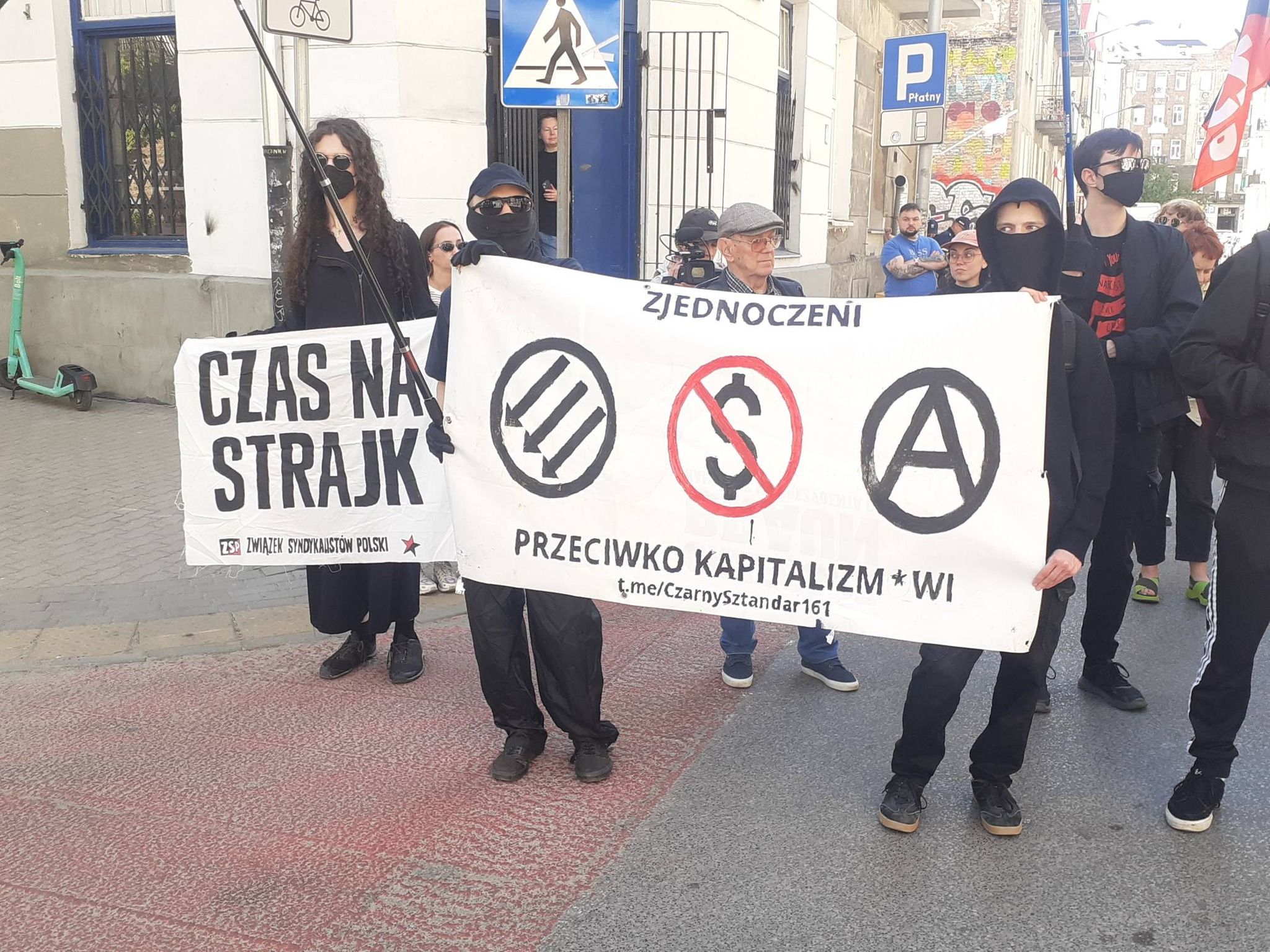
Banner of Black Flag (Czarny Sztandar) in Warsaw (2026).

For authorities referring to Marxism, anarchism was not ideologically close. Repression by the government apparatus was one of the more important reasons why anarchists did not develop their activities on a political ground. The anarchist movement in Poland began to take shape on a large scale only in the 1980s, during the wave of social protests. The role of the counterculture and the punk subculture played a key role in reactivating the anarchist movement in Poland.

The group that first referred to anarchism was the Alternative Society Movement (Polish: Ruch Społeczeństwa Alternatywnego, RSA). (Note: At first, the young oppositionists from the RSA did not know the doctrine of anarchism. They did not make contact with the pre-war anarchists who were still alive. During the Polish People's Republic, only a dozen or so books devoted to anarchism, which can be described as monographs, were published. Most of them have been developed in a careless, superficial and non-neutral way.) June 1983 is considered to be its symbolic beginning. The RSA was one of many groups opposing the then authorities.

At the end of the eighties, on the initiative of the RSA, the Anarchist Inter-city was established, which over time transformed into the Anarchist Federation (Polish: Federację Anarchistyczną, FA). Currently, FA has branches in many Polish cities, including Warsaw, Poznań, Łódź, Rzeszów and Wrocław.

In Poznań there is the Publishing House of the Brotherhood "Trojka", which is associated with the Poznań section of FA and the Rozbrat squat. The history of the "Trojka" Society of the Brotherhood dates back to 1994, when it was established to popularize anarchist thought. Initially, Trojka published small brochures, but now it distributes its own and other publications. The publications of the Trojka include both the works of the classics of anarchism and books written by contemporary authors.

After 1980 many groups unrelated to the RSA and FA were also created. Nowadays, anarchism is also referred to by, among others, the Workers' Initiative, the Left Alternative, the "Freedom-Equality-Solidarity" Association, and the Union of Polish Syndicalists.

The group that was openly formed in opposition to the FA and RSA circles was the People's Liberation Front (Polish: Ludowy Front Wyzwolenia, LFW), whose members, considering the peaceful methods of struggle to be ineffective, called for a transition to violent direct action. In 1991, the group set fire to the Soviet consulate in Tricity in response to the KGB murder of the Russian anarchist Piotr Siuda. The emergence of the LFW was the first attempt since the pre-war times to reactivate the armed activities of the anarchist movement.

Nowadays the most radical forms of activity are referred to by the Internet portals Greece on Fire (also an informal publishing house), as well as Black Theory. In the published content, they sometimes express their support for the ideology of insurrection.

== See also ==
- Category:Polish anarchists ( 19 )
- List of anarchist movements by region
- Communism in Poland
- Liberalism in Poland

== Bibliography ==
- Marek, Lew Paweł (2006). Na krawędzi życia. Wspomnienia anarchisty 1943–44 (in Polish). Kraków: Anarchistyczna Federacja Polski – Suplement C.
- Antonów, Radosław (2004). Pod czarnym sztandarem. Anarchizm w Polsce po 1980. roku (in Polish). Wrocław.
- Chwedoruk, Rafał. Polish Anarchism and Anarcho-Syndicalism in the 20th century.
- Grinberg, Daniel (1997). Z dziejów polskiego anarchizmu (in Polish). Zielona Góra.
- Kaczmarek, D., ed. (2002). "Ciężka jest nasza walka, ale za to owocna – odezwa grupy „Internacjonał" z października 1905 r.". Odezwy i proklamacje polskich grup anarchistycznych (in Polish). Poznań. p. 5.
- Kaczmarek, Damian (2004). Początki anarchizmu polskiego. Rys historyczny z wyborem publikacji źródłowych (in Polish). Poznań.
- Kaczmarek, D. (2008). "Anarchizm w publikacjach zwartych w okresie PRL". Przegląd Anarchistyczny (in Polish). 7: 152–178.
- Korzec, Paweł (1965). Pół wieku dziejów ruchu rewolucyjnego Białostocczyzny (1864–1914) (in Polish). Książka i Wiedza.
- Szczepański, Tomasz (1999). Ruch anarchistyczny na ziemiach polskich zaboru rosyjskiego w dobie rewolucji 1905–1907 (in Polish). Mielec.
