= Augustyn Wróblewski =

Polish biochemist and activist (1866-1913)

- Born: 20 July 1866; Vilna, Vilna Governorate, Vilna Governorate-General, Russian Empire
- Died: 1913 (aged 46–47); Warsaw, Warsaw Governorate, Congress Poland

Augustyn Wróblewski (1866–1913) was a Polish biochemist, journalist and an activist in the anarchist, temperance and social purity movements. His scientific career, during which he made discoveries in lactic acid fermentation, was stifled by his anarchist politics, which landed him in prison and later prevented him from advancing in academia. After he was committed to a psychiatric hospital, he lost interest in science and turned towards advocacy of abstinence. In his journal Czystość, he agitated for the abolition of prostitution and laid the foundations for the eugenics movement in Poland. He was largely forgotten after his death, until his works espousing an anti-authoritarian left-wing politics were rediscovered in the 21st century.

== Biography ==
=== Early life ===
Augustyn Wróblewski was born in Vilna in 1866. He was raised into the Polish nobility, the second son of Eustachy Wróblewski and Emilia Beniowska. He studied at a Russian grammar school in Saint Petersburg. He reported struggling with his studies, criticising himself as "indolent".

=== Education, activism and scientific career ===
In 1887 he moved to Riga, where he studied chemistry at the Polytechnical Institute. During this time, he joined an anarchist secret society and his political activism landed him a 2-year sentence in military prison. He was expelled from university for his activism, and his family refused to provide him with legal help. After his release, he was conscripted into military service and sent to Turkestan, where he served in the 5th Rifle Battalion.

After his military service finished, in 1891, Wróblewski moved to Kraków, where he reconnected to his family. He hoped to remain there and continue his studies near his brother Tadeusz, but according to him, his ambitions took him elsewhere. He resumed his studies in chemistry in Switzerland. He went to earn his doctorate at the University of Berlin, then later worked at the Pasteur Institute. But his anarcho-syndicalist views made it difficult for him to find a place in academia, with his application for a habilitation at the University of Warsaw being rejected.

He eventually returned to Kraków, where he taught biochemistry. In 1901, he discovered that lactic acid fermentation was accelerated by certain kinds of phosphate. After getting into a fight at a friend's flat, in September 1902, Wróblewski was diagnosed with psychosis and committed to a psychiatric hospital in Tworki. He asked his brother to help get him out, but he refused, causing an irreconcilable rift between them. He subsequently moved away from science and sought to promote a new kind of ethics. During this period, he penned dozens of works about his thoughts, including on the political philosophy of anarchism. Wróblewski became a patron of the Eleuteria society, which promoted smoking cessation and teetotalism.

=== Temperance activism ===
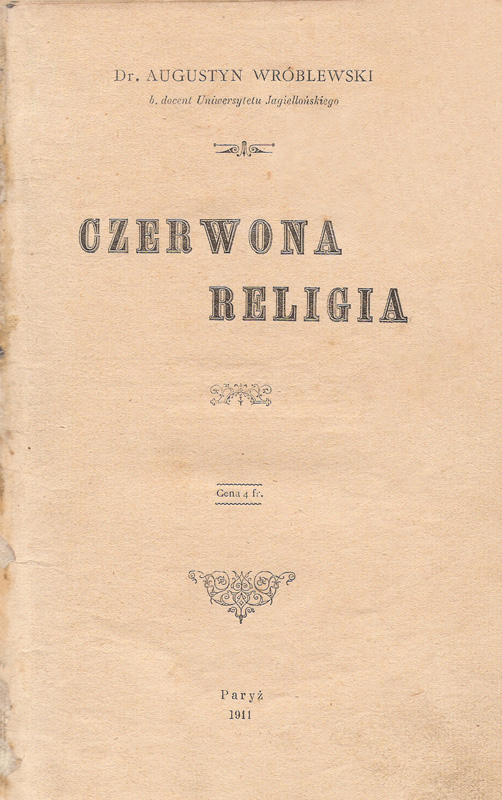
The title page of the 1911 edition of Red Religion (Czerwona Religia), a project of an atheist, ethico-religious system of organising a society in the spirit of left-wing politics

During the 1905 Revolution, Wróblewski established the journal Czystość (English: Purity), which he edited until 1909. In its first issue, he called for the "elevation of public morality" and for a change in social norms. Wróblewski called for all Polish people to engage in self-improvement, which he believed to require sexual abstinence and temperance.

He also called for the abolition of prostitution, aiming to improve sexual and reproductive health, women's rights and "social purity". He observed that the revolution had made social activism against prostitution in Poland possible for the first time, as they were able to finally respond to the problems they saw with the Imperial Russian government. In an effort to combat prostitution and promote sexual abstinence, he circulated information about sexually transmitted infections, which he worried could lead to social degeneration. He also claimed that most sex trafficking was carried out by Jewish people, and described clients of sex workers as "not only the users of prostitution, but also its victims". However, he also criticised Polish nationalist attacks against brothels during revolutionary riots.

The journal laid the foundations for the eugenics movement in Poland, with Wróblewski himself calling for couples with genetic disorders to be provided with birth control so that they would remain childless. In 1909, Wróblewski became chairman of the Society for Combating Secret Diseases and Propagation of the Principles of Abolitionism. He reorganised the society into two sections, which would separately research medical matters and engage in social activism.

=== Death and legacy ===
Wróblewski died c. 1913. He was largely forgotten by Polish society and academia, until his life and work was rediscovered in the 21st century, as more people took an interest in non-Marxist forms of left-wing politics. In 2011, Radosław Antonów collected his political works together into Anarchista z rozpaczy (English: An Anarchist out of Despair).

== Bibliography ==
- Barnett, James A. (2005). "Glucose Catabolism in Yeast and Muscle". In Semenza, G.; Turner, A.J. (eds.). Selected Topics in the History of Biochemistry: Personal Recollections, IX. Comprehensive Biochemistry. Vol. 44. Elsevier. pp. 1–132. doi:10.1016/s0069-8032(05)44001-2. ISBN 9780444518668. OCLC 173818864.
- Dąbrowski, Przemysław (2021). "Augustyn and Tadeusz Wróblewski — difficult brotherly relations as presented in family correspondence: At the genesis of social, political and legal thought". Review of Institute of the Grand Duchy of Lithuania. 1: 17–24. doi:10.24426/rigdl.v1i0.213.
- Gawin, Magdalena (2018). Race and modernity: a history of the Polish eugenics movement (PDF). Translated by Waśkiewicz, Agnieszka. Instytut Historii PAN. ISBN 978-83-65880-28-4.
- Krzywiec, Grzegorz (2011). "Short notes: Nineteenth and Twentieth Century" (PDF). Acta Poloniae Historica. 104: 215–216. ISSN 2450-8462.
- Stauter-Halsted, Keely (2009). "Moral Panic and the Prostitute in Partitioned Poland: Middle-Class Respectability in Defense of the Modern Nation". Slavic Review. 68 (3): 557–581. doi:10.1017/S0037677900019744.
- Stauter-Halsted, Keely (2011). "The Physician and the Fallen Woman: Medicalizing Prostitution in the Polish Lands". Journal of the History of Sexuality. 20 (2): 270–290. doi:10.1353/sex.2011.0021. JSTOR 41305857. PMID 21748901.
- Stauter-Halsted, Keely (2016a). "Bio-politics between Nation and Empire: Venereal Disease, Eugenics, and Race Science in the Creation of Modern Poland". East Central Europe. 43 (1–2): 134–160. doi:10.1163/18763308-04302006.
- Stauter-Halsted, Keely (2016b). The Devil's Chain: Prostitution and Social Control in Partitioned Poland. Cornell University Press. doi:10.7591/9781501701665. ISBN 978-1-5017-0166-5.
