= Rozbrat =

Squatted left-wing project in Poland

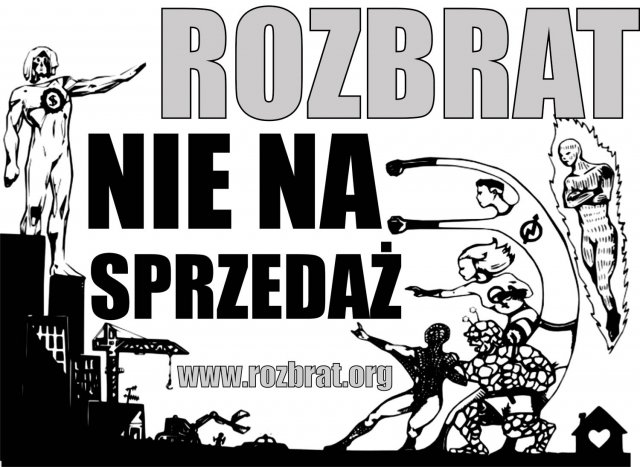
- "Rozbrat not for sale"

General information
- Status: self-managed social centre, squat
- Address: Pułaskiego Street 21a, Poznań
- Country: Poland
- Coordinates: 52.41752°N 16.91848°E
- Opened: 1994 (squatted)

Website
- www.rozbrat.org

Rozbrat is a long-running anarchist self-managed social centre in Jeżyce in Poznań, Poland.

== Occupation ==
Rozbrat is based in a former paint factory squatted in autumn 1994. The name means 'to make peace and get detached from an enemy.'

== Activities ==
Rozbrat hosts many events and discussions. Different groups use the space such as a bicycle workshop, silk-screen printers, anarchist library and infoshop, a gallery, the Breaking (Ear)drums samba band and Food not Bombs. The local branch of the Federacja Anarchistyczna has been based at Rozbrat since 1997.

The centre's longevity means that it is well supported in Poznań, although its future remains precarious.

== Antifascist ==
Rozbrat joined with groups including Stonewall and Poznań Free from Hate to protest when Robert Winnicki, member of the Polish Parliament and then chairman of the far-right All-Polish Youth organization wanted to speak in Poznan in 2017.

Rozbrat has experienced two serious neo-Nazi attacks in 1996 and 2013. The perpetrators of the first attack received jail sentences after seriously wounding a sleeping person.

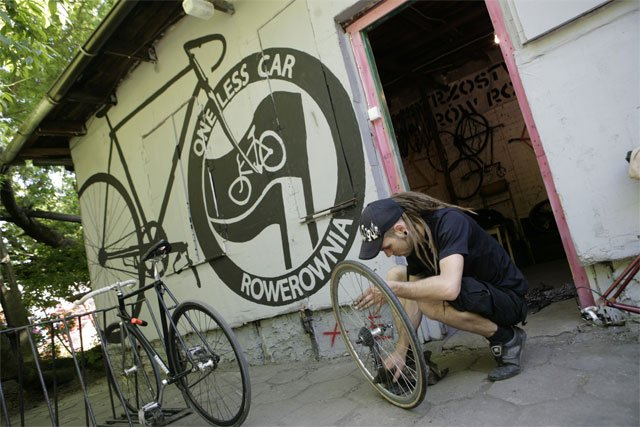
Rozbrat bicycle workshop

== Related Initiatives ==
- Workers' Initiative (Inicjatywa Pracownicza)
- WSL Wielkopolska Tenants' Association - member of European Action Coalition to the right to housing and to the city
- Anarchist bookstore Zemsta opened as an offshoot of Rozbrat in central Poznań.
