= Federacja Anarchistyczna =

Anarchist Federation
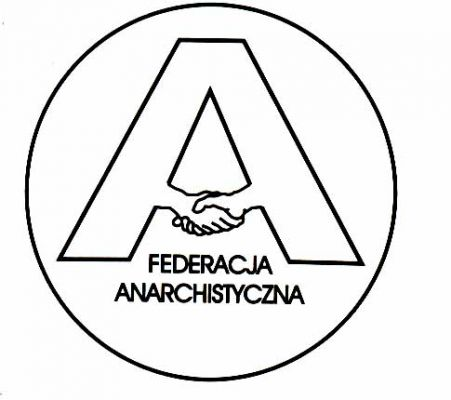
- Federacja Anarchistyczna Logo
- Formation: 1988
- Founder: Janusz Waluszko; Krzysztof Galiński
- Website: https://federacja-anarchistyczna.pl/

Federacja Anarchistyczna (Anarchist Federation or (FA)) is a federation of Polish anarchist organizations. The federation was founded in 1988 (initially founded as "Międzymiastówka Anarchistyczna" (MA) or the Inter-City Anarchist Association) and was inspired by the Pre-World War group the Anarchist Federation of Poland. MA began as a loose collective for multiple anarchist organizations where they could meet and coordinate movements. In 1989, the organization rebranded to FA and formalized itself ideologically.

FA aims to "create a self-governing society, created on a voluntary basis".

== History ==
=== Międzymiastówka Anarchistyczna ===
In May 1988 Janusz Waluszko (a member of the anarchist group Ruch Społeczeństwa Alternatywnego {RSA}) and Krzysztof Galiński (a member of the anti-communist group Ruch Wolność i Pokój) first developed the idea of the Inter-City Anarchist Association, calling it a "network of positive exchange". In drafting the proclamation for their new organization, Waluszko and Galiński declared they were unable to fight the state alone, and instead needed to organize for that purpose. The inaugural manifesto of the Anarchist Intercity in June 1988 reads:

Anarchy can be understood as an infinite possibility of individual encounters. It can be understood as a series of individual attitudes, but also as an attempt at a new arrangement of community life, as a republic of friends. In this connection, following Edward Abramowski, we invite universal collusion against the state, and following him we also state that the only essentially valuable ingredient in development is the development of friendship, only with this is the superiority of social development measured. [...] Individuals and their groups do not, as a rule, go beyond their own ghettos. The stopping of social and mental activity at this level leads to suicide both in the eyes of people, for whom we become madmen and provocateurs, and in fact – because we succumb to depressions and utopias. Instead of being pushed to ever more extreme positions, let's expand the margin of our functioning in society. The anarchist movement should not be some organization with a definite structure and directing the actions of individual groups, but the aspiration of people to oust the state from all areas of the life of society and the individual, and to replace it by the voluntary cooperation of the same. [...] The anarchist circle in Gdańsk initiates this activity by creating the Anarchist Inter-City.

— Ruch Anarchistyczny – Tak!. W: D. Kaczmarek (red.): Ruch Społeczeństwa Alternatywnego 1983–1991. Poznań: 2009, s. 120 i n.

In their manifesto, Waluszko and Galiński proposed that they planned to carry out anarchist activism through: joint rallies and festivals; mutual assistance in organizing theatrical performances, puppet theaters, rock concerts, poetry evenings, cabarets, recitals, exhibitions, lectures, demonstrations and manifestations, discussions, processions, museums and film screenings, shows, diaporamas, happenings, publishing activity, and creating anarchist libraries.

During the July and August 1988, the Silesian Freedom and Peace movement carried out an event in Białogóra's Hyde Park. It was attended by representatives of the anarchist movement from all over Poland, such as: Marek Kurzyniec, Grzegorz Kmita, Janusz Waluszko, and Krzysztof Skiba. Members of Totart from Gdańsk and Waldemar Fydrych, the founder of the Orange Alternative, also attended. Here, MA began recruiting members, eventually growing to 500 individuals by September 1988. On 30 October 1988 in Gdańsk, MA held their first convention at Międzymiastówka, having been inspired by the Międzymieście anarchist group. The meeting was attended by approximately 100 anarchists, with anarchists from France, Poland, and the USSR in attendance. The meeting was held at the homes of an RSA member but was interrupted by police, resulting in 4 arrests. The rest of the attendees reconvened at St. Nicholas Church in Gdansk, where they finished the meeting. At the beginning of 1989, the first, and last, issue of MA's newspaper "Pet in the Butter" was published, which preceded the later "Biuletyn Federacji MA" and "Biuletyn Informacyjny Federacji Anarchistycznej" newsletters.

In June 1989, the Second Meeting of the Anarchist Inter-City Council was held in Dobrzeń Wielki. During the meeting, the organizational shape of the anarchist movement was discussed. The organisers of the convention proposed the creation of a federation of anarchist groups. The aim was to prevent the "chaos of information" resulting from the existence of many different groups within the movement. The organizers also proposed the adoption of a common ideological declaration, believing that this adoption would held the consolidation of the community. Most of the participants were in favor of transforming the MA into a more formalized structure. There were, however, also voices of opposition. For example, Zbigniew Sajnóg from Totart sent a letter to the organizers, in which he proposed to keep the concept of the MA as a loose network of contacts between anarchists. In the end, however, the final decision transformed Anarchist Association Inter-City into the Federation of Anarchist Inter-City. During the time that the creation of the federation was still being discussed, various actions under the banner of the MA were already taking place in the country.

=== Federacja Anarchistyczna ===
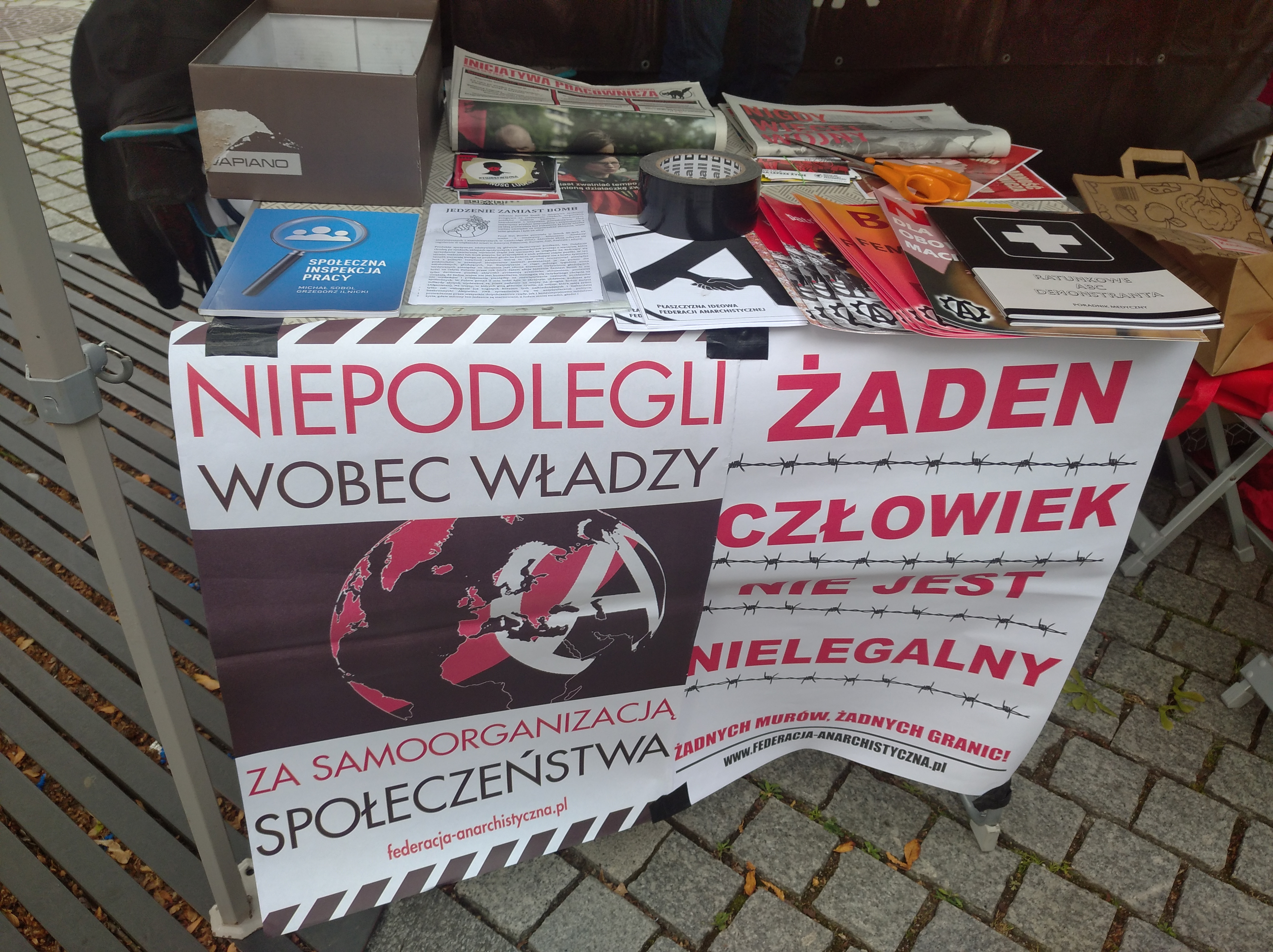
The stand of the Anarchist Federation at the equality picnic before the 5th equality march in Zielona Góra.

In November 1989, a third meeting was held in Warsaw, during which the name of the organisation was changed to "The Anarchist Federation", which is still used today. During the meeting, it was also resolved that all decisions, if they concern the Federation as a whole, can only be made at conventions. This meant that internal matters pertaining to the federation could only be passed by majority vote, and in the case of "external" matters, (i.e. all initiatives addressed to the general public signed as the Anarchist Federation) the right of veto would be recognised. The overall goal of FA, as agreed upon by its members is:

"the creation of an anarchist, i.e. free and self-governing society in which absolute freedom (limited only by the natural norm of not harming others) would be combined with the absence of exploitation, social justice and self-governing ownership of the means of production. People would freely form a variety of self-governments, syndicates, communities, and anarchist communes forming federations with each other on regional and national levels."

— Biuletyn Federacji Anarchistycznej

FA's formal ideology at the time was primarily to denounce consumerism, capitalism and Bolshevik communism. They protested against re-privatization, selling off national assets, enfranchisement of the nomenklatura, progressive social stratification, Poland's 'submission' to the International Monetary Fund. They also criticized the actions of Tadeusz Mazowiecki's government, considering his actions a betrayal of the ideals expressed in the anarcho-syndicalist's concept of a "Self-governing Republic".

== Structure ==
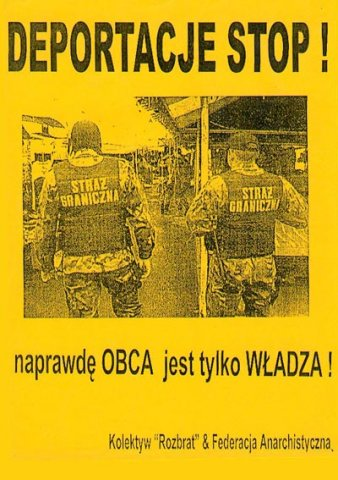
"Deportation Stop!" FA poster during Rozbrat squat

=== Formal Organization ===
Organizationally, the Anarchist Federation is composed of 'sections'. As described by FA: "An FA section is a self-governing group of people who have declared their desire to join the FA, constitute an organizational unit, can pass resolutions within the group, and have been accepted at the FA convention into the Anarchist Federation." For a group seeking to join FA, it must accepted by majority vote at a FA convention, with all sections carrying veto power. Every section is entitled to one vote and may withdraw from the FA should it desire. A section may also be expelled from the Federation at the request of another section at an FA convention – the decision on this matter is made by majority vote with the right of veto.

The Anarchist Federation Information Office operates in the period between conventions, forming decisions on current, external affairs. The office coordinates the flow of information between sections, acts as a liaison between sections, updates the contact list of all sections, and adopts resolutions.

The groups making up the Federation enjoy a high degree of autonomy. The sections must, however, agree with the overall ideological beliefs of the Federation, which "unites people whose aim is to overthrow the hierarchical social order which contradicts the idea of freedom and democracy", and which strives to "create a self-governing society, formed on a voluntary basis". It is incumbent upon a particular section to organize a FA convention, and all groups belonging to the Federation are required to participate once a convention is called. "Contact" members (non-section groups) who pledge to perform tasks for the Federation must submit a report at the next convention on their work in carrying out those tasks. If they cannot attend the next convention, they are required to submit a written report.

=== Conventions ===
The Anarchist Federation has described their conventions as: "the most significant manifestation of the activity of anarchist structures on the national forum". Conventions typically end with the issuance of resolutions. During the Eighth Congress of the FA, held in June 1992 in Warsaw, the ideological declaration of the Anarchist Federation called "The Majority Plane" was passed; so far (November 2010) thirty-seven conventions have been held.

=== Sections ===
At the turn of the 20th and 21st century over a dozen sections from all over the country belonged to the FA, including Gdansk, Krakow, Warsaw, Poznan, Wroclaw, Kielce, Lodz, Lublin, Sochaczew, Slupsk and Koszalin. Between 1989 and 1998 a libertarian group from Katowice was also active in the Anarchist Federation. The Anarchist Federation is no longer active in Warsaw, since the section there announced that it was leaving the Federation in October 2021. Currently, the Anarchist Federation consists of the following sections:

- FA Czestochowa – Autonomous Anarchist Group
- FA Cracow,
- FA Łódź – Black Banner,
- FA Poznań,
- FA Rzeszów,
- FA Silesia,
- FA Wrocław

Additionally, their membership also consists of "contacts" (smaller groups which will eventually become sections). These include:

- FA Bydgoszcz,
- FA Gniezno,
- FA Konin,
- FA Leszno,
- FA Lublin,
- FA Nowy Sącz,
- Ostrów Wielkopolski FA,
- Szczecin FA,
- Zielona Góra FA

== Activities and Beliefs ==
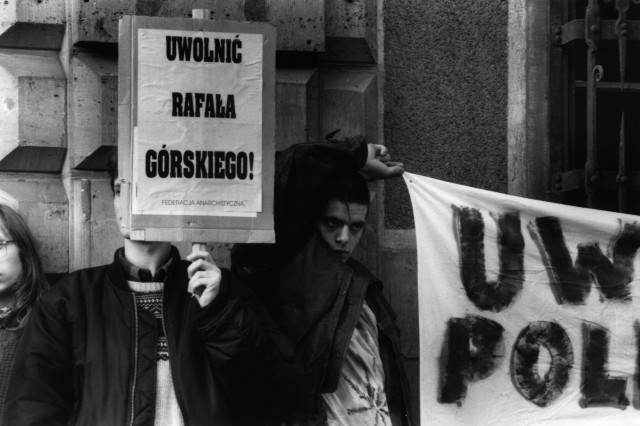
Photograph from FA's picket for the release of Rafał Górski

FA describes two separate types of anarchist activity they engage in:

- Direct actions – demonstrations, pickets, happenings, etc;
- Publishing activity.

FA has previously rallied around both domestic issues, specifically adopting policies on: anti-state, anti-government, pro-environmental, anti-fascist, anti-military, and anti-worker exploitation issues. They have additionally taken up policies on international issues, previously protesting against the actions of individual states and international organizations, and having specifically criticized globalization. Since their inception, FA has not changed their policies on the topics of: pro-choice, anti-militarism and pacifism, communalism, and free education.

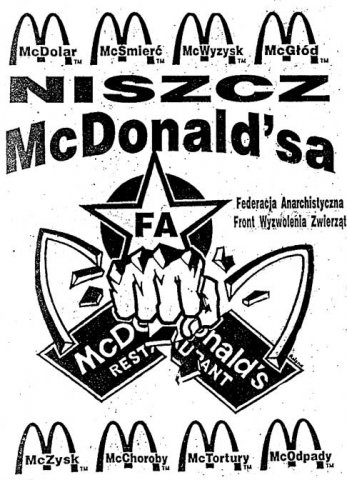
Poster from the Rozbrat squat protesting McDonalds

FA has organised protests against corporations, in particular McDonalds, and foreign governments, namely against the military intervention of the USA in Afghanistan and Iraq, and against Russia's 1994 invasion of Chechnya. The Anarchist Federation has also protested against the G8 summits, the European Economic Forum in Warsaw, NATO, the installation of the missile defence shield in Poland, and the United Nations climate summit in Poznań in 2008. Anarchists from the FA also participate in protests called "Food Not Bombs".

=== National Government Protests ===
FA has stated their anti-parliamentary policies and boycotting activities derive from ideals of Pierre-Joseph Proudhon, Mikhail Bakunin and Peter Kropotkin. (Note: Within the Anarchist Federation, the libertarian group "Autonomous Anarchist" had advocated they participate in elections. This resolution was never taken up by the Federation as a whole.) FA will release anti-election posters, and leaflets in protest of Polish and international elections, being particularly critical of representative democracies. On the topic of voting, FA has stated, "The whole truth about voting can be summed up in one sentence: by voting, you give others power over yourself. By choosing one or many masters, whether for a short or long time, you give up your own freedom". These leaflets are predominately posted online, often with the phrases:

- "Compatriots! And now we don't give a damn about you! With greetings from the newly elected deputies and senators of the Republic of Poland"
- "If elections changed anything, they would have been illegal long ago. Don't vote! Keep your vote to yourself"
- "Direct democracy – YES! Representative democracy – NO!"
- "Don't vote for anyone! Turn on your brain and don't let the system think for you!"
- "All power is based on your passivity and fear. Don't vote for anyone !!! !"

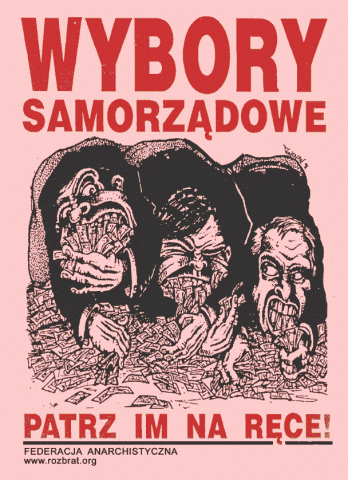
Protest poster from the Rozbrat squat.

Anarchists from the FA took part in May Day demonstrations against Soviet Poland and organized anti-tax rallies. In the early 1990s in several Polish cities, FA protested against the introduction of religion to schools, and in front of the Sejm they led protests against the passing of the anti-abortion law. In recent years, FA activists have been defending tenants as part of the campaign "Mieszkanie Prawem NIE Towarem" (Apartment [are a] Right, NOT a Commodity), by participating in eviction blockades.

In 2009, following an eviction blockade, anarchist Rafał Górski was hospitalized due to injuries he received in a subsequent police raid, later dying due to pre-existing cancer. This event would draw heavy criticism from both FA and international anarchist groups.

=== Anti-Fascism ===
FA identifies itself as a part of the anti-fascist movement. In the early 1990s, FA co-founded Radical Anti-Fascist Action (RAAF), which was designed as a 'defence group' to protect people against fascist attacks. Anarchists outside of FA criticized RAFF, stating that the activity of anti-fascist groups would not solve fascist problems, rather they were only addressing a symptom of the issue. These critics stated that FA only went after minor issues, such as combating racist and nationalist slogans. Marek Kurzyniec, a member of FA Krakow, argued that: "disorientation, lack of a revolutionary alternative and social crisis – this is the subsoil for the birth of 'para-fascist' behaviour. This is the cause of evil. Skins and "regime rhetoric" are only an effect of these phenomena. In order to be effective one has to fight at the source, that is, fight for the support and awareness of those environments without which fascist ideology would never have developed. Radical, class-based trade unions, without the ballast of ossified union structures, that is the only effective means of fighting the recidivism of Nazism".

=== Squatting ===
FA considers squatting to be an 'important manifestation' of anarchist activity. FA has previously overtaken abandoned buildings and adapted them for the purposes of housing, cultural centers, libraries, etc. One squat in particular, which reached national headlines in Poland, is the Poznan squat of Rozbrat. The squat was first established in 1994, and since 1997 is the seat of the Poznan section of the Anarchist Federation. It houses an anarchist library, FA meetings, and has been the site of cultural events.

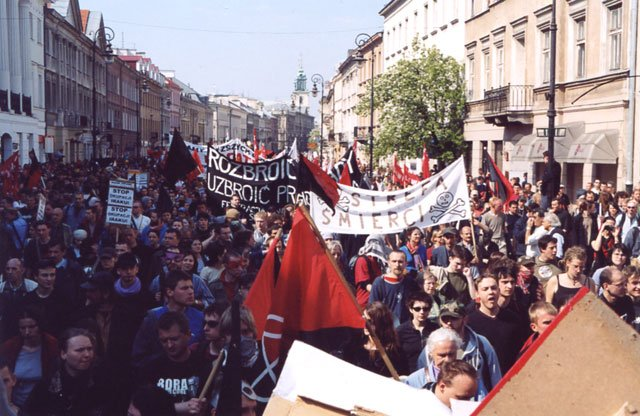
Protest inside the Rozbrat squat, 2004

=== Publishing ===
The FA community is also active in publishing. In the 1990s, FA published the magazines: "Legless Locomotive", "Anarcholl", "Morning Rebel", "Revolt", "Fraternite", "Lagazeta". FA has also made contributions to: "Mać Pariadka" (published until 2005), "Gazeta An Arche" (published monthly until 2000), "Inny Świat" (still being published). Between 1999 and 2004, the newspaper "A-tak" was published by FA, and was relaunched in 2015.

Both "Inny Świat" and "Anarchist Review" are published by the anarchist Brotherhood Publishing Office "Trojka", which is associated with the Poznan section of the Anarchist Federation and the Rozbrat squat. The history of the Brotherhood Publishing House "Troika" dates back to 1994, when it was established to popularize anarchist thought. Initially "Troika" published small brochures, but currently it distributes its own and third-party publications.

== See also ==
- Anarchism in Poland
- Workers' Initiative

== Bibliography ==
- R. Antonów, Pod czarnym sztandarem. Anarchizm w Polsce po 1980 roku, Wrocław 2004.
- D. Grinberg, Ruch anarchistyczny w Europie Zachodniej 1870–1914, Warszawa 1994.
- P. Malendowicz, Polski ruch anarchistyczny wobec współczesnych wyzwań politycznych, Piła 2007.
