= Federation of Fighting Youth =

Polish anticommunist organization

- Federacja Młodzieży Walczącej
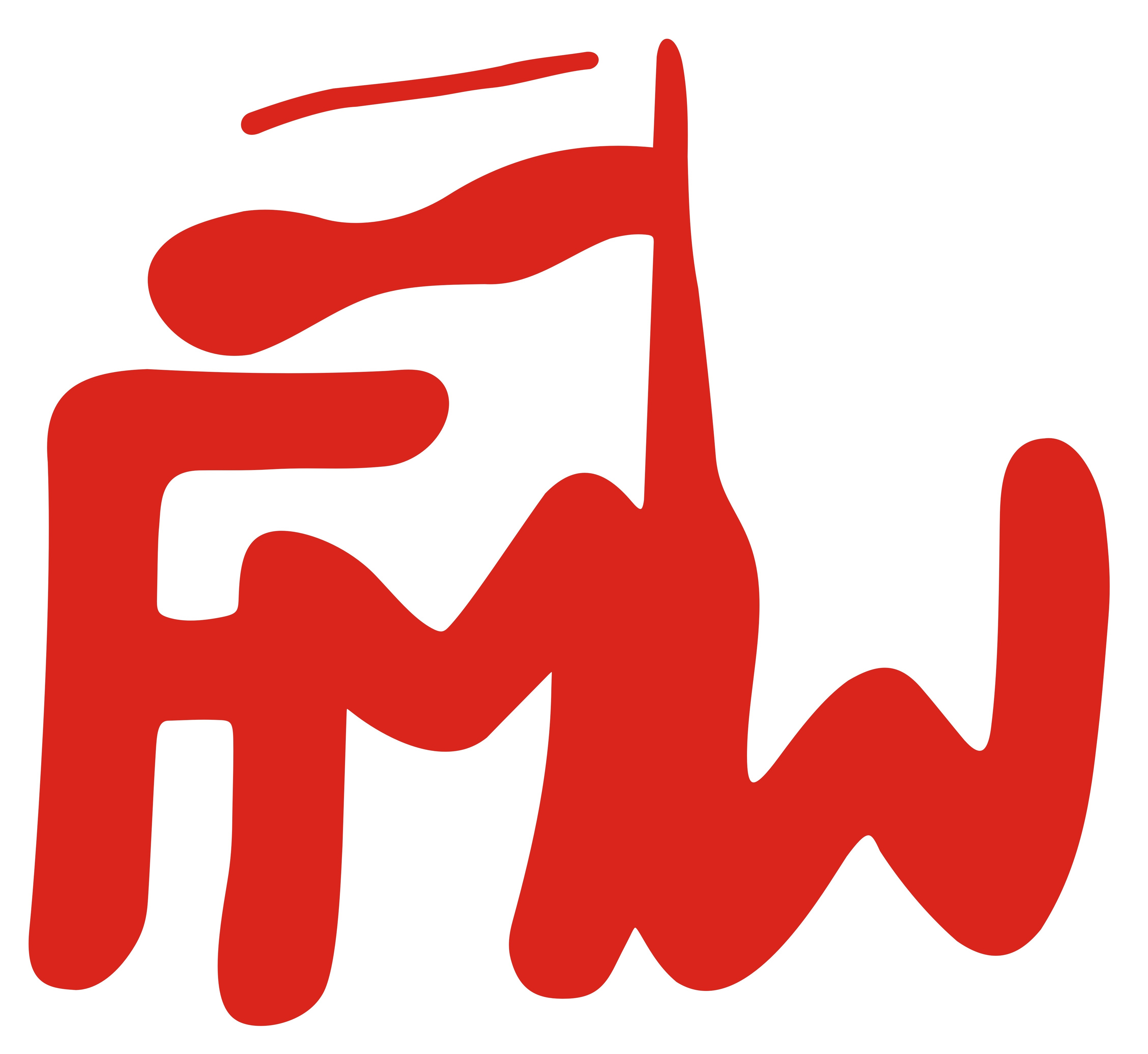
- Abbreviation: FMW
- Formation: June 29, 1984
- Founded at: Grochów, Warsaw
- Dissolved: 1989; 37 years ago
- Purpose: Anti-communism
- Location: Warsaw Voivodeship, Polish People's Republic
- Methods: Lectures, leafleting, graffiti
- Members: 1000
- Official language: Polish
- Publication: Serwis Informacyjny FMW

The Federation of Fighting Youth (Polish: Federacja Młodzieży Walczącej, also called FMW) was a anti-communist organization of Polish youth, existing from the mid to late-1980s. It was founded in June 1984 in Warsaw's district of Grochów by a group of high school students.

In September 1984, the Bunt underground publication announced the creation of the FMW, it also featured an appeal to Polish youth. The Federation's activists published their own magazine, called Serwis Informacyjny FMW (transl. Information Service of the FMW), which was printed in the format of a samizdat, in the period November 1984 - May 1985. In October 1984, high school students in Gdańsk founded their own branch of the Federation, and began publishing their own biweekly Monit.

In October 1985, a group of activists of the FMW decided to create the so-called Grupy Wykonawcze (transl. Activity Groups), which began to actively fight the Communist system, by painting slogans on walls, distributing leaflets, and persecuting members of the Communist apparatus of repression. The FMW gathered not only high school students, but also college students, as well as laborers. At the beginning of 1985, the Federation acquired its own printing press, and quickly established itself in numerous Polish towns and cities. Altogether, it had around 1,000 members and was regarded as an open platform for those who wished for a free and democratic Poland. The FMW organized underground lectures and distributed underground press among Polish youth. It collected money for incarcerated members of the opposition, and helped families whose members were in prison. It closely cooperated with such organizations as the Independent Students Union, Solidarity, Fighting Solidarity, and the Solidarity Citizens' Committee. During the 1980s, the FMW was under the surveillance of the Security Service. Among its major centers were Cracow, Gdańsk, Warsaw, and Łódź.

The Federation ceased to exist in 1989.

== Prominent activists ==
- Sławomir Cenckiewicz
- Rafał Górski
- Katarzyna Kubisiowska
- Krzysztof Kwiatkowski

== See also ==
- Confederation of Independent Poland
- Orange Alternative

== Sources ==
- Artykul
