= Valeria Pulignano =

Italian sociologist

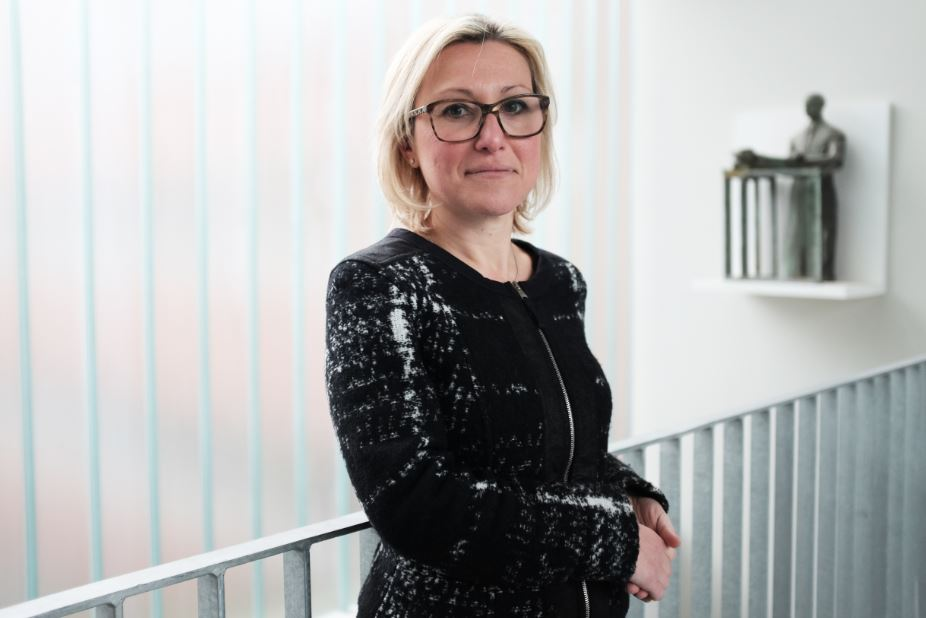
- Education: Warwick University, University of Calabria
- Known for: Comparative Industrial Relations and Employment Studies in Europe
- Scientific career
- Fields: sociology of work, comparative European employment (industrial) relations, labour market dualisation and inequality
- Thesis: (Ph.D. 1996)
- Website: https://soc.kuleuven.be/ceso/wo/erlm/team/valeria-pulignano

Valeria Pulignano (born 13 May 1968) is an Italian-born sociologist, full Professor of Sociology at the University of Leuven (KU Leuven), Belgium, and author of numerous publications on comparative industrial relations, labour markets and employment in Europe. She was formerly (2013–2017) scientific director of the Center for Social Sociological Research (CeSO) at KU Leuven. She is Specialty Chief Editor of the "Work, Employment and Organization" section of Frontiers in Sociology, co-coordinator of the RN17 Work, Employment and Industrial Relations at the European Sociological Association (ESA) and principal investigator of the ERC Advanced Grant Research Project “Revolving Precariousness: Advancing the Theory and Measurement of Precariousness Across the Paid/Unpaid Continuum” (ResPecTMe).

== Education ==
Pulignano obtained a bachelor's degree in economics and social science at the University of Calabria (summa cum laude) in 1992, followed by a PhD in sociology from the same university in 1996. Her dissertation on “Beyond the Factory. Supply Chain and Post-fordism” was published in 1997 with L’Harmanattan. Afterwards, she did a master's degree (mark: Distinction) in European Industrial Relations at Warwick University (1998–1997), with dissertation topic: “Teamwork and trade unions representation: Italy and United Kingdom compared”, which was subsequently published (under a similar title) in Capital & Class in 2002. She then spent 1998–2000 as a post-doc in sociology and worked together with Giuseppe Bonazzi at the Department of Sociology, University of Turin. Dissertation Topic: “Outsourcing and the modular organisation of production in the auto sector: Evidence from Brazil, Italy and France”. Based on that work, in 2002 she co-edited with Giuseppe Bonazzi and Michele La Rosa a special issue on “Sociology of Work and Organizational Studies: the State of the Debate in Italy and Great Britain”.

== Career ==
Pulignano is a scholar of employment relations and labour markets, their changing nature and implications for voice at work and labour market inequality in terms of differences in wages, working conditions, job quality and wellbeing. She focuses on European and national (macro) policy processes as well as (micro) power dynamics, that accompanied the changes within the production organization of large corporations; and their effects on wages working conditions and job quality. This has led to two major contributions: The first is the profound theoretical approach of ‘sociological institutionalism’, where social actors (both capital and labour) – and their power resources – are the central agents of changes within capitalist societies. In her comparative work on employment where she uses a more ‘dynamic’ and less ‘functionalist’ analytical perspective, she has empirically and theoretically contributed to strengthening the sociological political economy (‘power’ as socio-political) dimension within the study of industrial and employment relations and labour markets, and their transformations, which she has approached from a European comparative perspective.

The second major contribution is a more complex and novel interpretation which considers capital and labour as social forces (‘agents’) of change whose respective nature has undergone continuous fundamental change. By studying the different forces, actors, and processes that concurrently shape the transformations at work, her research in the last ten years has helped to shed light on the importance of using a macro-micro and micro-macro approach empirically and analytically as a way of linking different levels of analysis through the use of a combination of qualitative and quantitative (mixed) methods.

== Honors ==
- Member of the Academische Stichting Leuven (Academic Foundation Leuven), 2016
- Guest Professorship Chair at the Department of Socio-Economic Studies (DIESE) Sapienza University of Rome - Awarded by the Italian Minister of Scientific Research - April–May 2017
- Principal coordinator International Francqui Professor: Steven Vallas 2017-2018
- Fellow Industrial Relations Research Unit, Warwick University, since 2005
- Co-Researcher Interuniversity Research Centre on Globalization and Work (CRIMT), University of Montreal and University of Laval, since 2003
- Co-president European Sociological Association (ESA) RN17 Work, Employment and Industrial Relations
- Scientific Coordinator Center for Sociological Research (CESO) – KU Leuven 2013–2017
- Member of the advisory board (Raad van Bestuur) of HIVA (Hoog Instituut van Arbeid) Since 2014
- Member of the International Advisory Board of the Work and Equalities Institute at the University of Manchester, United Kingdom – Since 2016
- Member of the International Advisory Board of Centre for European Research (CERGU) at the University of Gothenburg, Sweden, since 2016
