= Trade Unions Forum =

Polish trade union

FZZ
- Trade Unions Forum
- Forum Związków Zawodowych
- Founded: April 2002
- Headquarters: str. Juliana Smulikowskiego 6/8; PL 00-389 Warsaw
- Location: Poland
- Key people: Dorota Gardias, president
- Website: www.fzz.org.pl

The Trade Unions Forum (Polish: Forum Związków Zawodowych, FZZ) is a national trade union center in Poland. It held its first congress on April 15–16, 2002 in Warsaw, second on April 26–28, 2006 in Zegrze near Warsaw, and on April 12–14, 2010 in Bydgoszcz.

Despite opposition, particularly from the All-Poland Alliance of Trade Unions (OPZZ), the FZZ has secured membership at the Polish Tripartite Commission.

In 2005 during the campaign for parliamentary elections, FZZ failed to form an election coalition with the left-wing populist peasants party "Samoobrona" led by Andrzej Lepper.

The membership of FZZ to the European trade union confederation CESI is suspended, as FZZ does not pay its fees and is absent from meetings.
