= Workers' Initiative =

Polish trade union confederation

- All-Poland Trade Union Workers' Initiative
- Ogólnopolski Związek Zawodowy Inicjatywa Pracownicza

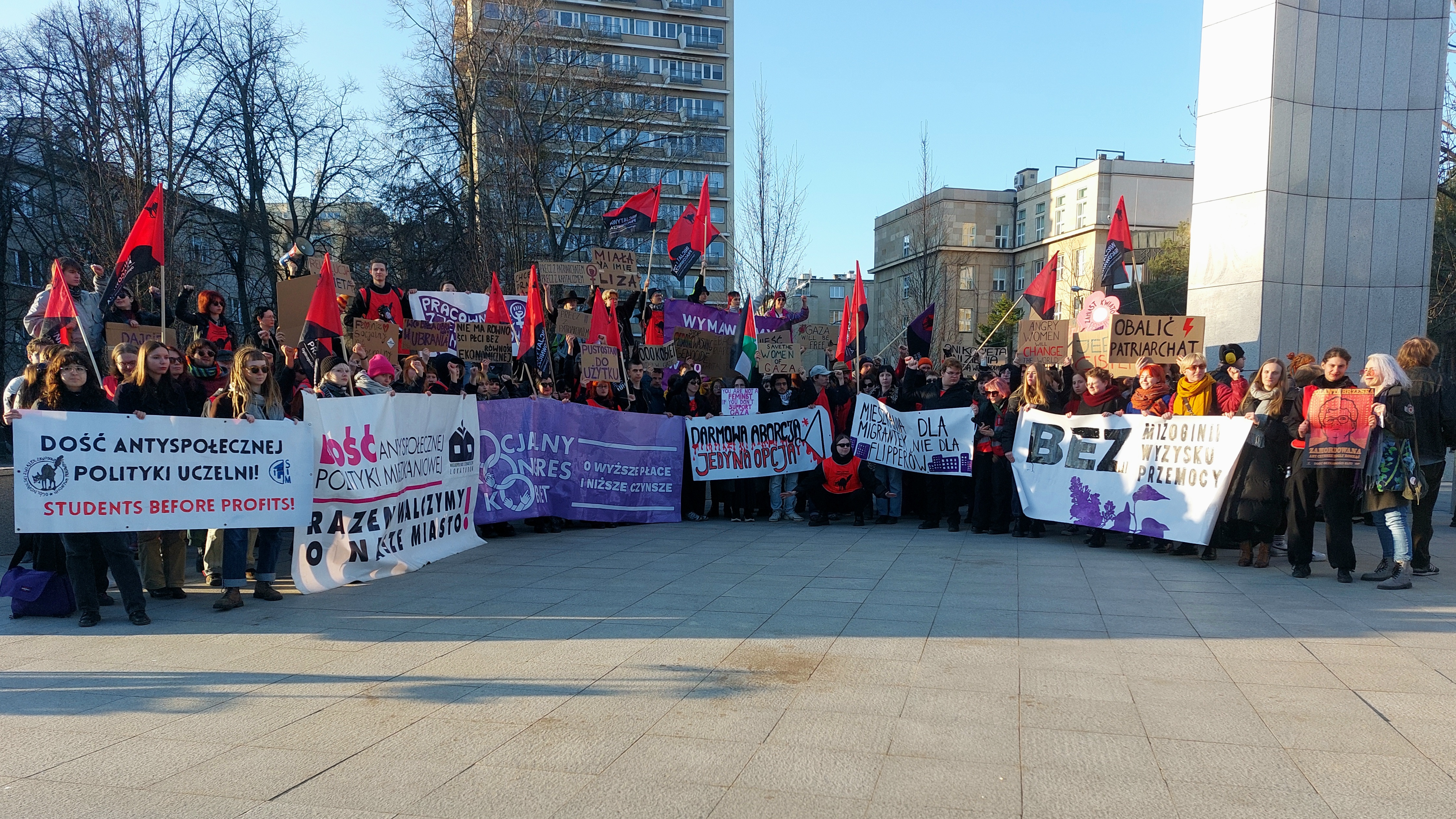
- Political demonstration by the OZZIP (2024)
- Abbreviation: OZZIP; IP
- Established: 2001; 25 years ago
- Type: National trade union confederation
- Registration no.: 0000215247
- Headquarters: Kościelna 4, Poznań
- Location: Poland
- Members: 3,500 (2020)
- Affiliations: International Confederation of Labour
- Website: ozzip.pl

The All-Poland Trade Union Workers' Initiative (Polish: Ogólnopolski Związek Zawodowy Inicjatywa Pracownicza; OZZIP), commonly known simply as Workers' Initiative (Polish: Inicjatywa Pracownicza; IP), is a Polish anarcho-syndicalist trade union center. Established by Polish anarchists in 2001, the union attracted workers who were dissilusioned by the larger trade union centers. Through its decentralised structure, the union has focused on organising precarious workers, including in the country's logistics, care and cultural industries. In collaboration with other social movements, the union also engages in community unionism, in which local activists support workplace struggles through milieu committees.

== Establishment ==
The 1988 Polish strikes, led by the Independent Self-Governing Trade Union "Solidarity" (NSZZ), ultimately culminated with the fall of Communism in Poland. Over the 1990s, the trade union movement experienced a rapid decline; the main trade union confederations, Solidarity and the All-Poland Alliance of Trade Unions (OPZZ), lost 70% of their members. Independent trade unions, outside the main trade union confederations, began to come together to form their own independent confederations.

By the turn of the 21st century, members of the Polish anarchist movement moved to form their own trade unions. The All-Poland Trade Union Workers' Initiative (Polish: Ogólnopolski Związek Zawodowy Inicjatywa Pracownicza; OZZIP) was established in 2001. It initially took the form of an informal initiative, coordinated by activists in Poznań and workers at a local ship-engine factory who had split off from Solidarity. The first trade union of the OZZIP was established at a factory of H. Cegielski – Poznań. Throughout the early 2000s, the Workers' Initiative actively supported workplace struggles, leading to the growth of the organisation. In 2004, the organisation decided to reorganise into a national trade union center, giving it a more fixed structure and bringing it in line with Polish trade union legislation, which provided more protection for its members.

== Growth ==
The OZZIP's method of organising, which avoided the establishment of a trade union bureaucracy and tended to avoid formal relations with employers, proved attractive for some Polish workers. Throughout the late 2000s, workers that were disillusioned with the larger unions increasingly broke away and joined Workers' Initiative. By 2009, the OZZIP counted 700 members, of whom between 20 and 25% were women. During the early 2010s, OZZIP's unionisation of precarious workers at companies such as Amazon, as well as cultural workers, resulted in another membership surge. By 2015, Workers' Initiative counted more than 1,000 members. During the late 2010s, the OZZIP experienced a rapid membership growth, growing to count 3,500 members by 2020. It also gained a substantial social media following, counting 9,754 followers on Facebook in August 2020; more followers than even large confederations such as Solidarity and the OPZZ. Nevertheless, As of 2023, OZZIP is a lot smaller than the big Polish trade unions.

== Campaigns ==
=== Monitor ===
In 2011, employees of Monitor, an electronics assembly factory based in a special economic zone in Lower Silesia, began organising themselves into a union under the banner of Workers' Initiative. Women activists of the OZZIP distributed flyers around the factory, demanding the "normalisation" of working conditions. Having operated the factory without industrial action for five years, the management was taken off guard by the establishment of the union. As the first union at the factory, it rapidly grew from 20 members in December 2011 to 45 members the following month; by April 2012, it had 73 members, which made up 45% of the factory's workforce. In order to protect its membership from reprisals, union members remained anonymous, which ensured the employers did not know which employees were union members, while also causing some communication and planning issues. Union activism was also restricted by the intensity of the work, so meetings took place in mornings, when workers had the time and energy to participate. Negotiations between the union and management dragged on, as the employers refused to make any concessions to the union. Divisions between non-union temporary workers and unionised permanent workers also caused issues; when temp workers responded to low wages with a wildcat strike, the permanent workers refused to join the strike. Only after four months of negotiations with the employers resulted in no concessions, the union began to encourage the refusal of work.

=== Junk contracts ===
Workers' Initiative was one of the first Polish union confederations to accept precarious and self-employed workers as members, even before legislative reform formally allowed workers in these sectors to join unions. The OZZIP has agitated for workers' self-management among precarious workers, which it organises through "inter-company committees" (Polish: komisje międzyzakładowe). In 2006, Workers' Initiative was the first Polish union confederation to refer to precarious employment by the term "junk contracts" (Polish: umowy śmieciowe), terminology picked up by the larger confederations during the workers' rights campaigns of the 2010s. Between 2013 and 2015, Workers' Initiative established milieu committees for precarious workers, including artists, civil servants and NGO workers. It also established a committee for self-employed crane operators.

Workers' Initiative's agitation against junk contracts culminated in 2015, when it launched its "We the Precariat" campaign, which aimed to increase class consciousness among precarious workers and mobilise them for political demonstrations. As union campaigns over junk contracts coincided with that year's parliamentary elections, unions and political parties began to converge on the issue; while Law and Justice (PiS) aligned itself with Solidarity, Partia Razem aligned with the OZZIP's own campaign by calling itself the "Party of the Precariat". Workers' Initiative also collaborated with the Polish squatters' movement, as part of a strategy of "social movement unionism".

=== Care workers in Poznań ===
In 2011, the mayor of Poznań Ryszard Grobelny announced a wage freeze for nursery workers, which would remain in place until 2023. The city's care workers subsequently joined the Workers' Initiative, within which they coordinated a series of protest actions. As they were unable to take strike actions, which they believed would be more detrimental to the children in their care than their employers, they wore protest badges at work and informed parents of their poor working conditions. They also picketed the Poznań Town Hall and blocked traffic, the first such actions by municipal workers.

=== Ukrainian migrant workers ===
In 2015, Workers' Initiative began a campaign to protect the workers' rights of Ukrainian migrant workers. It called for equal treatment of Ukrainian and native Polish workers and offered its support to any migrant workers whose rights were violated. Workers' Initiative established a domestic workers' trade union, the first union of its kind in Poland. The union has aimed to improve working conditions for domestic workers, by agitating for better wages and legal contracts. According to a report by CARE International, the OZZIP's campaign to raise awareness about the situation of migrant workers had a "significant impact" on the domestic labour sector.

=== Amazon ===
Through its decentralised structure, the Workers' Initiative was able to organise workers in the Poland's logistics industry. In the mid-2010s, Workers' Initiative established an inter-company committee for temporary workers at Amazon. Workers' Initiative was the first trade union in Poland to organise a union in Amazon, bringing together 150 workers in one branch. During the COVID-19 pandemic in Poland, pre-existing industrial disputes at Amazon warehouses intensified due to the health and safety issues brought by the pandemic. OZZIP mobilised to put pressure on the company, in order to reduce working hours and the intensity of the working conditions. Following the dismissal of a union activist and labour inspector in November 2021, OZZIP organised street protests against Amazon.

== Organisation ==
Workers' Initiative is a multi-sector union, which participates in workplace organising in all grades of the private and public sector. Workers' Initiative engages in decentralised forms of union organisation, through peer groups and community organising. It attempts to restrict union bureaucracy by not employing any full-time union activists, which limits the concentration of decision-making power by individuals. This reinforces local union structures, although it also stalls communication, with only one small headquarters to coordinate between different localities.

Drawing from the methods of community unionism, Workers' Initiative organises what it calls "milieu committees" (Polish: komisje środowiskowe), which bring together employed, self-employed and unemployed workers, as well as students and economically inactive people. It also makes use of what it calls "inter-company committees" (Polish: komisje międzyzakładowe); these initially organised workers at privatised former state-owned enterprises, but in the mid-2000s, they were restructured to organise precarious workers. Milieu committees organise to support company-level committees in their locality, where local activists can mobilise broader support outside the workplace.

These structures give Workers' Initiative the ability to organise workplaces that larger union confederations have struggled to enter, including non-governmental organisations and the logistics industry. Temporary workers, including self-employed artists, have been offered individual membership by the OZZIP. The OZZIP has also sought to establish links with the wider left-wing social movement in Poland. It has formed links with anti-eviction groups and tenants unions, as well as the broader Polish anarchist and feminist movements.

== Ideology ==
As an anarcho-syndicalist union, Workers' Initiative upholds a radical form of trade unionism that practices class conflict. The union sees social dialogue and social partnerships between workers and employers as not being their main strategy, stating, "Polish: Nie chcemy też szukać na siłę 'dialogu społecznego' w obliczu bezwzględności pracodawców., lit. 'We don't want to forcibly seek 'social dialogue' in the face of employers' ruthlessness'". Mrozowicki and Maciejewska view the union's stated aims as "call[ing] for the building of a class consciousness", with the ultimate goal of obtaining a "completely different world" ("Polish: Walczymy o całkowicie inne oblicze świata, lit. 'We're fighting for a totally different world'"). The union asserts that capitalism and state socialism are both unreformable. To maintain its independence, Workers' Initiative refuses to support any political parties in Poland.

== Bibliography ==
- Czarzasty, Jan; Mrozowicki, Adam (2023a). "The nail in the coffin? Pandemic and social dialogue in Poland". Employee Relations: The International Journal. 45 (7): 62–78. doi:10.1108/ER-06-2022-0289. ISSN 0142-5455.
- Czarzasty, Jan; Mrozowicki, Adam (2023b). "Poland: Trade unions developing after a decline". In Waddington, Jeremy; Müller, Torsten; Vandaele, Kurt (eds.). Trade unions in the European Union: Picking up the pieces of the neoliberal challenge (PDF). Peter Lang. pp. 833–869. doi:10.3726/b20254. ISBN 978-2-87574-634-4.
- Gardawski, Juliusz; Mrozowicki, Adam; Czarzasty, Jan (2012). Trade unions in Poland (PDF) (Report). European Trade Union Institute.
- Keryk, Myroslava (2018). Working in Poland: violations of the labour rights of Ukrainian migrants in the construction and services sectors (PDF) (Report). Our Choice Foundation. pp. 3–44.
- Klakla, Jan Bazyli; Koss-Goryszewska, M.; Kulesa, A.; Pająk-Załęska, K.; Zarychta, M. (2023). In the Shadows: Ukrainian Domestic Workers in Poland (Report). CARE International.
- Kubisa, Julia; Rakowska, Katarzyna (2021). "Established and emerging fields of workers' struggles in the care sector: the case of Poland". Transfer: European Review of Labour and Research. 27 (3): 353–366. doi:10.1177/10242589211028097.
- Maciejewska, Małgorzata; Mrozowicki, Adam (2016). The rise of the dual labour market: fighting precarious employment in the new member states through industrial relations (PDF) (Report). Central European Labour Studies Institute.
- Marino, Stefania; Bernaciak, Magdalena; Mrozowicki, Adam; Pulignano, Valeria (2018). "Unions for whom? Union democracy and precarious workers in Poland and Italy". Economic and Industrial Democracy. 40 (1): 111–131. doi:10.1177/0143831X18780330.
- Mrozowicki, Adam; Maciejewska, Małgorzata (2013). "Conflicts at Work in Poland's New Capitalism: Worker Resistance in a Flexible Work Regime". In Gall, Gregor (ed.). New Forms and Expressions of Conflict at Work. Palgrave Macmillan. doi:10.1057/9781137304483_11. ISBN 9781137304483.
- Mrozowicki, Adam; Krasowska, Agata; Karolak, Mateusz (2015). "'Stop the Junk Contracts!' Young Workers and Trade Union Mobilisation against Precarious Employment in Poland". In Hodder, Andy; Kretsos, Lefteris (eds.). Young Workers and Trade Unions. Palgrave Macmillan. doi:10.1057/9781137429537_8. ISBN 9781137429537.
- Mrozowicki, Adam; Karolak, Mateusz; Krasowska, Agata (2016). "Between commitment and indifference: trade unions, young workers and the expansion of precarious employment in Poland". In Delteil, Violaine; Nikolaev Kirov, Vassil (eds.). Labour and Social Transformation in Central and Eastern Europe. Routledge. pp. 228–246. doi:10.4324/9781315682112-21 (inactive 15 November 2026). ISBN 9781315682112.
- Mrozowicki, Adam; Maciejewska, Małgorzata (2017a). "Bricolage unionism. Unions' innovative responses to the problems of precarious work in Poland" (PDF). In Bernaciak, Magdalena; Kahancová, Marta (eds.). Innovative union practices in Central-Eastern Europe. European Trade Union Institute. pp. 139–159. ISBN 978-2-87452-449-3.
- Mrozowicki, Adam; Maciejewska, Małgorzata (2017b). "'The practice anticipates our reflections' – radical unions in Poland". Transfer: European Review of Labour and Research. 23 (1): 67–77. doi:10.1177/1024258916679320.
- Palęcka, Alicja; Płucienniczak, Piotr P. (2020). "We're in this Together: Framing Contest over the Precariat in the Third Sector in Poland". Polish Sociological Review. 212 (4): 461–476. doi:10.26412/psr212.05. ISSN 1231-1413. JSTOR 27093081.
- Polkowska, Dominika (2021). "Social partners and the world of work in Poland: Between East and West". In Vaughan-Whitehead, Daniel; Ghellab, Youcef; Bustillo Llorente, Rafael M. de (eds.). The New World of Work. Edward Elgar Publishing. pp. 369–405. doi:10.4337/9781800888050.00016. ISBN 9781800888043.
