= Bernard Konrad Świerczyński =

Polish anarchist activist

- Born: Bernard Konrad Świerczyński; August 20, 1922; Warsaw, Second Polish Republic
- Died: October 31, 2002 (aged 80); Warsaw, Republic of Poland
- Burial place: Powązki Cemetery
- Other names: Aniela; Kondek
- Occupation: Journalist
- Organization: Syndicalist Brigade
- Notable work: Monument to the Unknown Smuggler; Przemytnicy życia
- Spouse: Halina Goldberg
- Parents: Konrad Świerczyński (father); Janina Świerczyńska (mother)

Bernard Konrad Świerczyński (20 August 1922 – 31 October 2002) was a journalist, writer, and anarchist activist. During the occupation of Poland he provided help to Jews in Warsaw and was subsequently awarded the title of Righteous Among the Nations by Yad Vashem.

== Biography ==
=== Early life ===
Świerczyński was raised in a left-wing family in the Wola district of Warsaw. The only surviving child of 8 siblings his family spoke the Wiech variant (named after Stefan Wiechecki) of the Warsaw subdialect at home. His father, Konrad, was a member of the Polish Association of Freethinkers and the Anarchist Federation of Poland. As a teenager he was removed from school by his parents to avoid religious classes and was instead tutored by the anarchist Aniela Wolberg.

=== WWII ===
Following the Nazi occupation of Poland and the establishment of the Warsaw Ghetto on the orders of the General Government, Świerczyński began smuggling food, medicines, weapons and communications to Jewish friends and acquaintances living there. Through his acquaintance with the left-wing activist Stanisław Skrypij, Świerczyński was aware of the mass murder of Jews at Treblinka. As such he helped Jews who escaped the Ghetto by hiding them in his family home. Jewish people he helped included fellow anarchists Marek Lőw, Stefania Marek and her mother following their escape from a concentration camp at Falenty. He also helped Jews he had known before the war such as Freda Hoffman Zgodzinski and his future wife Halina Goldberg.

=== After the war ===
On 30 January 1972, Yad Vashem awarded Świerczyński the title of Righteous Among the Nations

=== Death ===
Świerczyński died on 31 October 2002 in his native Warsaw.

== Selected works ==
- Monument to the Unknown Smuggler (Warsaw, 2017)
