= Irreligion in Poland =

Religion in Poland (2021)
1. Catholicism (71.3%)
2. Other Christian denominations and religions (1.20%)
3. Unanswered (20.6%)
4. No religion (6.90%)

Vice President of Polish Atheist Coalition Nina Sankari speaks on "In the Shadow of the Church in Poland" at the Secular Conference 2014.

Atheism and irreligiosity are uncommon theological beliefs in the country of Poland, with a majority of the country's population subscribing to Roman Catholicism. However, religious demographics have shifted in recent decades, contributing to the social tensions within the country. According to a 2020 CBOS survey, non-believers make up 3% of Poland's population.

Census data from Poland in 2023 showed that 71% of the country identified as Catholic, which was down from 88% 10 years ago. Those with no faith rose from 2.4% to 6.9%, and those who refused to answer rose from 7.1% to 20.5%.

== History ==
=== Renaissance ===
Atheism in Poland dates back to the Renaissance. In the sixteenth century, individuals who were considered to be atheists include the royal courtier Jan Zambocki, the geographer Alexander Skultet, and a professor of the Academy of Krakow, Stanislaw Zawacki. In 1588, Krakow released a pamphlet Simonis simoni Lucensis ... Athei summa Religio, wherein the doctor Simon of Lucca staying at the royal court says the idea that God is a figment of the mind. An important figure in the history of atheism on Polish territories was Kazimierz Łyszczyński, sentenced in 1688 (the judgment was made a year later) to the death penalty for his work on the work of De non existentia Dei ("The Non-Existence of God").

=== Nineteenth century ===
In the nineteenth century, open proclamation of atheist views was rare, although a certain part of the intelligentsia openly admitted to atheism (including Wacław Nałkowski and Maria Sklodowska-Curie).

During the Second Republic, President Gabriel Narutowicz was said to be an atheist.

In this period, overt atheism was not a widespread view, even among anti-clerical and secular intelligentsia, as evidenced by the fact that in the Second Republic the traditional association of atheists – Freemasonry of the Great East - had not been established despite the existence of acting freethinking organizations: Polish Association of Freethinkers, Polish Association of Free Thought or Warsaw Circle of Intellectuals. They were also issued a letter Rationalist.

=== Recent developments ===
In the twentieth and twenty-first centuries, Poles declaring a lifelong or temporary atheistic worldview include Tadeusz Boy-Żeleński, Tadeusz Kotarbiński, Ludwik Krzywicki, Irena Krzywicka, Witold Gombrowicz, Władysław Gomułka, Jan Kott, Jeremi Przybora, Mariusz Szczygiel, Wisława Szymborska, Stanisław Lem, Tadeusz Różewicz, Marek Edelman, Jerzy Kawalerowicz, Zygmunt Bauman, Maria Janion, Tadeusz Łomnicki, Włodzimierz Ptak, Jacek Kuroń, Kazimierz Kutz, Jerzy Urban, Roman Polański, Jerzy Vetulani, Karol Modzelewski, Zbigniew Religa, Jan Woleński, Andrzej Sapkowski, Kora Jackowska, Lech Janerka, Wanda Nowicka, Magdalena Środa, Jacek Kaczmarski, Aleksander Kwaśniewski, Kazik Staszewski, Kuba Wojewódzki, Janusz Palikot, Jan Hartman, Maria Peszek, Dorota Nieznalska and Robert Biedroń.

After World War II to the turn of the 1980s and 1990s, atheist worldview has been propagated by the state, which manifested itself, among others, in limiting building permits, as well as the expansion of new churches, the persecution of the clergy (e.g. the illegal arrest of Cardinal Stefan Wyszynski) and harassment of members of the Communist Party taking regular participation in religious practices. In 1957, the decision of the Central Committee at the propaganda and agitation department of the Central Committee was established committee.

In the communist Poland Association of Atheists and Freethinkers worked well – supported by the authorities – and later also Society for the Promotion of Secular Culture, formed on its basis in 1969. On the other hand, some declared atheists were involved in the activities of the democratic opposition, like Jacek Kuroń, and Adam Michnik.

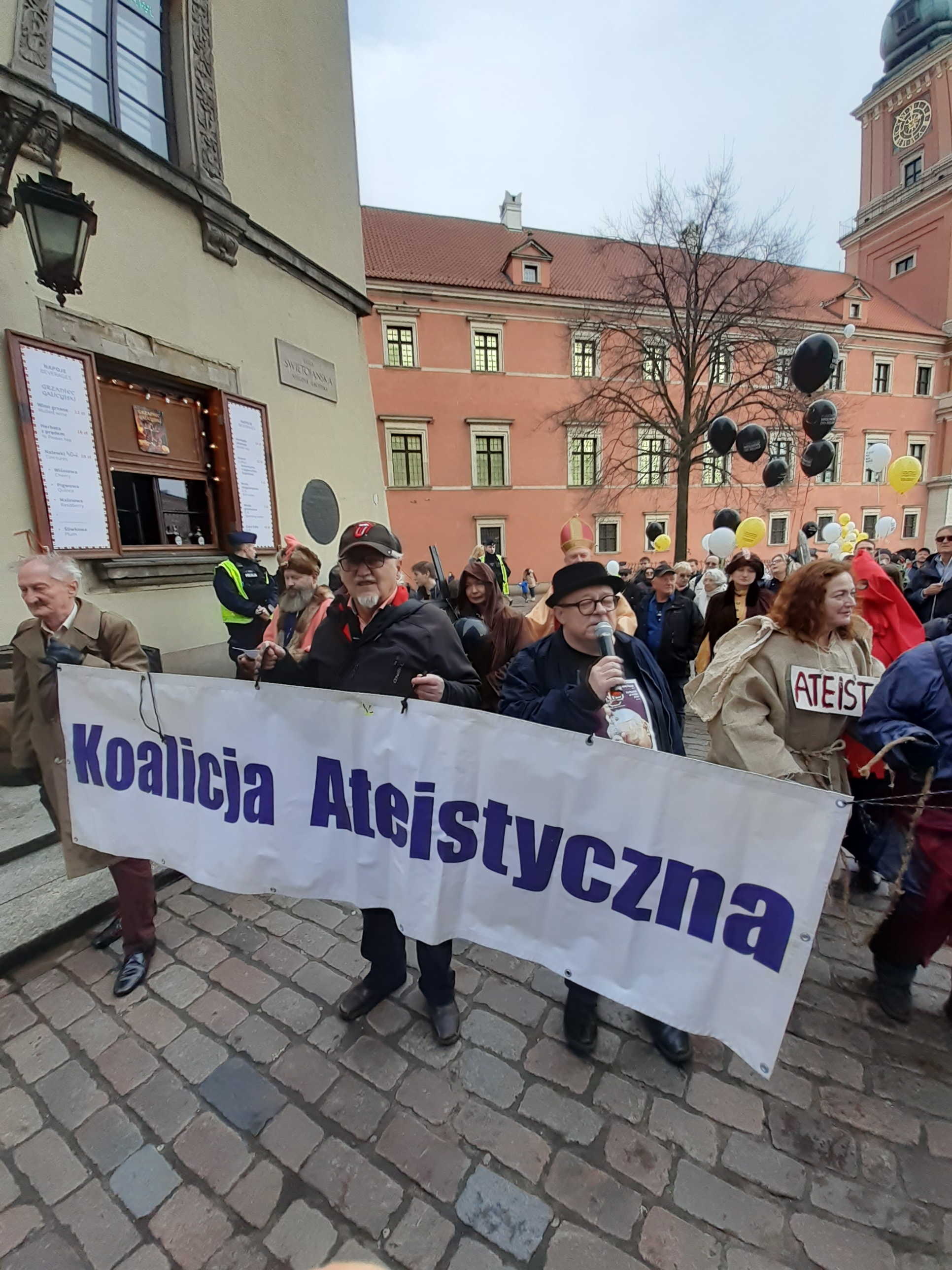
Banner of the Atheistic Coalition carried during the march of atheists in Warsaw (2023).

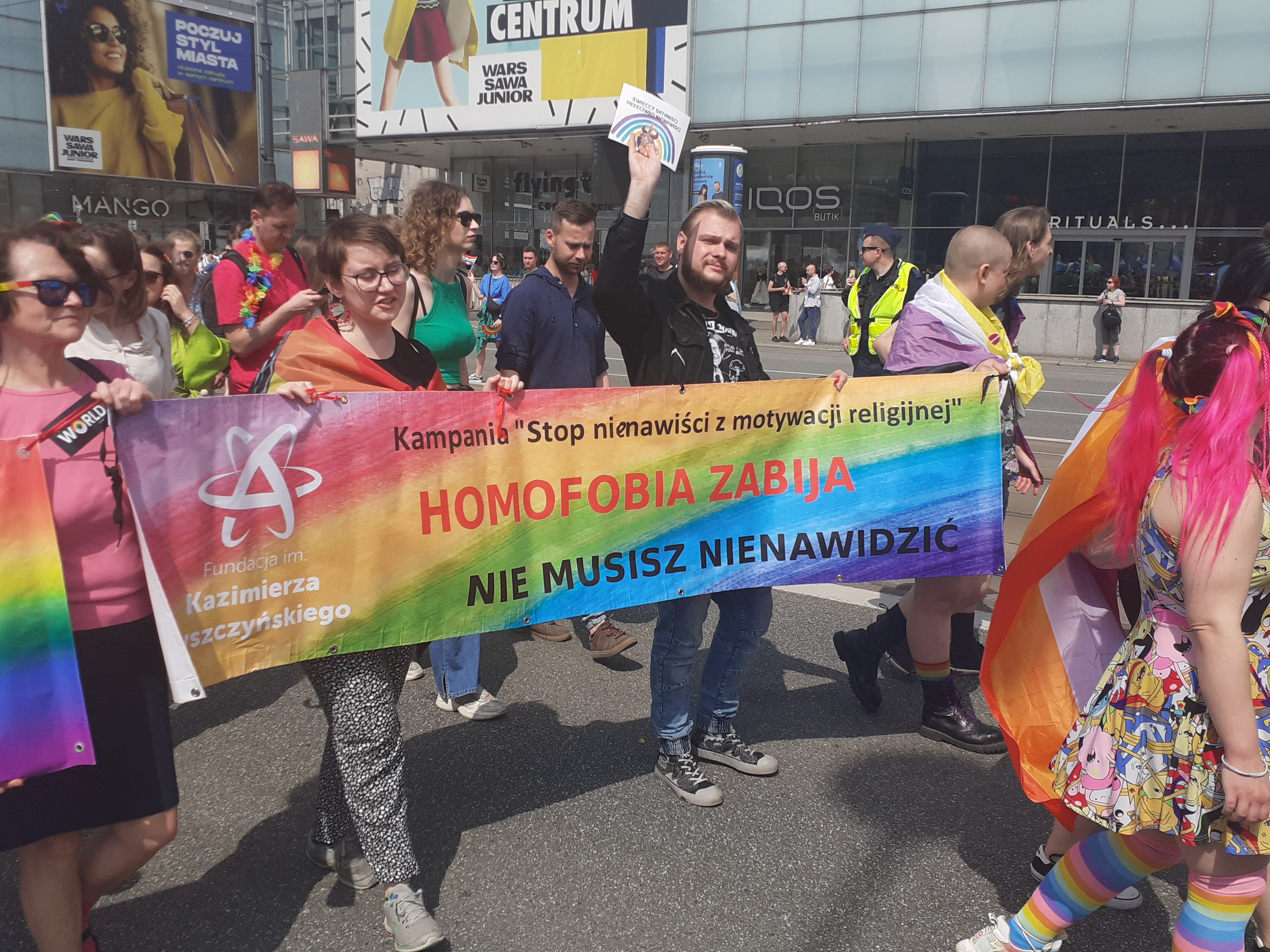
Foundation Kazimierz Łyszczyński at the Equality Parade in Warsaw in 2023.

After the fall of the Polish People's Republic, despite the lack of state support, atheism and the process of secularization have not disappeared. In 2007, the wave of popularity of the book "The God Delusion" by Richard Dawkins. and his social campaign under the name of The Out Campaign started in English speaking countries and reached Poland. Thus the List of Internet Atheists and Agnostics was established, led by the Polish Association of Rationalists. On that list a person could openly admit their atheism or agnosticism. The initiative aimed to promote ideological assertiveness among the unbelievers, checking the presence of believers in the social life and the strengthening of cooperation between free thinkers. Many leading Polish media have written dozens of articles about this initiative, causing a discussion on the situation of unbelievers in Poland (Gazeta Wyborcza, Cross-section, Overview, Republic, Newsweek, Trybuna, Gazeta Pomorska, Kurier Lubelski, Wirtualna Polska, Życie Warszawy), and on the radio TOK FM a debate about atheism took place between the academic priest Gregory Michalczyk and the founder and then-president of the Polish Rationalist Association, Mariusz Agnosiewicz. After two months since the launch of Letters, inscribed on it more than 7500 participants of the action. Agnosiewicz went a step further by organising a campaign under the name Internet Photo Atheists, which was launched on 6 December 2009.

In response to the rapid progress of atheism in Poland, a Parliamentary Group for prevention of atheism in Poland was established in 2012 by the Polish Sejm. It consists of 39 deputies and 2 senators. At the turn of 2012/2013, the Polish Association of Rationalists, together with the Foundation Freedom of Religion organized in several Polish cities including Rzeszów, Lublin, Częstochowa, Kraków and Świebodzin an action under the slogan "Do not steal, do not kill, do not believe" and "If you do not believe, you are not alone". According to the organizers they served to consolidate the people of atheistic worldview. On March 29, 2014, an Atheists' March was organized in Warsaw in the framework of Days of Atheism, during which there was a staging of the execution of Kazimierz Łyszczyński, sentenced in 1689 to death for his treatise "the non-existence of the gods," in which the role was played by Jan Hartman, a professor of philosophy, bioethics and then an activist of Your Movement, a progressivist political party.

The 2014 Procession of Atheists in Poland commemorated Kazimierz Łyszczyński, who is considered to be the first Polish atheist.

== Statistics ==
In 2004, 3.5% of the citizens of Poland identified as non-believers or indifferent religiously. According to the Eurobarometer survey taken in 2005, 90% of Polish citizens said they believed in the existence of God, a further 4% not determined. In 2007, 3% identified as a non-believer.

Polish citizens – this means that this group has doubled its size within two years. However, according to the survey from 2012 the number of people in Poland who declared atheism, agnosticism or atheism was 3.2% and disbelief 4%. And, according to the Eurobarometer studies, in the same year 2% of the population of Poland were atheists, and 3% were agnostics and otherwise non-denominational.

According to the results of Census of Population and Housing 2011, individuals who claim not to belong to any religion accounted for 31 March 2011 were 2.41% of the total Polish population. While taking into account that 7.1% covered by the census did not answer the question on religion, and to 1.63% not determined the matter, they accounted for 2.64% of those who responded to the question about religious affiliation.

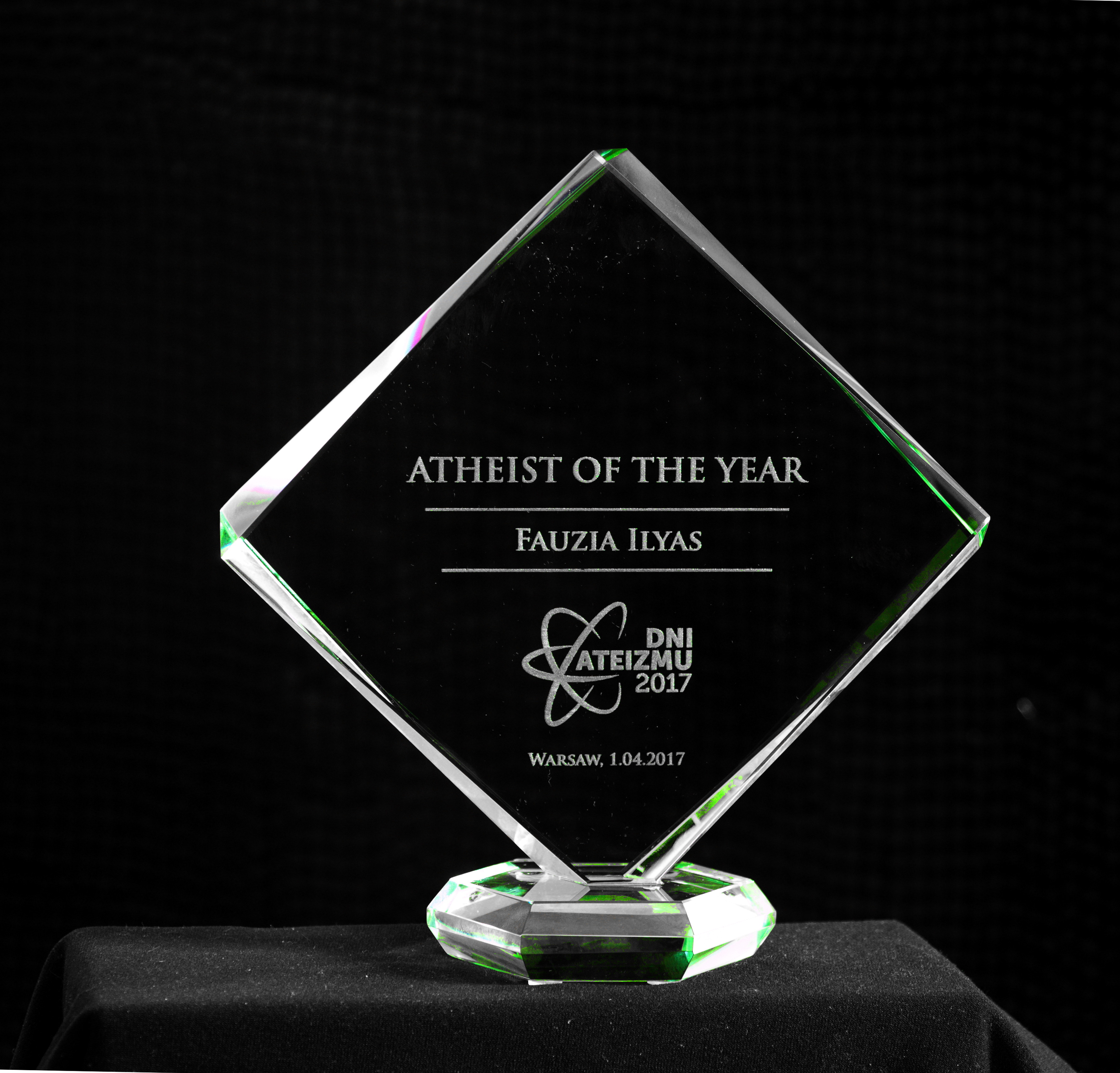
Atheist of the Year award by Kazimierz Łyszczyński Foundation.

According to data published in 2015 by GUS concerning the faith of Poles, most atheists are in Warsaw and Zielona Góra.

=== Organizations ===
Currently, some atheists in Poland are grouped, such as:

- Polish Association of Rationalists
- Polish Association of Freethinkers, whose patron is Kazimierz Lyszczynski
- Secular Culture Society, whose patron is Tadeusz Kotarbiński
- Polish Association of Free Thought
