= Syndicalist Organization "Freedom" =

Polish resistance organization

- Syndykalistyczna Organizacja „Wolność”
- Other name: SOW
- Dates active: 1940–1945
- Country: General Government
- Allegiance: Polish resistance movement
- Newspaper: Polska dla Ludu
- Size: Several hundred

The Syndicalist Organization "Freedom" (Polish: Syndykalistyczna Organizacja „Wolność”, SOW) was a Polish resistance organization founded in 1940 in Warsaw. The organization was established on the basis of the anarcho-syndicalist wing of the pre-war Union of Trade Unions (ZZZ) and part of the Union of Polish Democratic Youth (ZPMD). In 1941, the SOW made contact with the Polish Union for the Fight for Freedom of Nations (PZWWN).

== History ==
The chairman of the Central Committee of SOW was Wiesław Protschke, whilst the management of the organisation included Zofia Hajkowicz-Brodzikowska, Wiesław Protschke and Jerzy Leszczyński. The first external manifestation of their activity was the publication of the periodical Polska dla Ludu in the spring of 1940. SOW members fought in the PZWWN partisan unit in the Kielce region, which was merged with the Home Army in 1943–1944.

SOW was an organisation with probably several hundred sworn members in Warsaw, Kielce, Niewachłów, Jędrzejów, Skarżysko, Częstochowa and Kraków. It consisted mainly of factory workers and intellectuals. The management was formed by the Central Committee formed by Hajkowicz-Brodzikowska, Protschke, Leszczyński, Zygmunt Dymek and Kazimierz Zieliński. The SOW had its own printing house, the biweekly Walka Ludu with the military handbook Towarzy Pancerny and program brochures were published in Warsaw, and in Kielce the Revolutionary Press Agency. The organisation's journalism was clearly anti-state. The management of the socialised enterprises was to pass into the hands of workers' councils, and a federation of free municipalities was proposed in place of the state administration. Power would be exercised by assemblies of residents and delegates with binding mandates. Industry, trade, raw materials, land, banks and rental houses were to be socialised. People's militias were to replace the army. The following was written about the police: “We do not see any difference between the police apparatuses at all latitudes and longitudes. Where there is a police apparatus, there is privilege and oppression, and on the other hand there is poverty and harm”.

Combat activity took on the greatest dimensions in Kielce, where the partisan unit of the SOW commanded by Stanisław Janyst carried out attacks on trains and gendarmerie posts. In May 1943, the anarcho-syndicalist troops surrendered to the Home Army (AK), which was justified by the need for unity in the fight against Nazism. The cooperation between SOW and ZSP Union of Polish Syndicalists was corrected. When on February 5, 1944, after a siege of several hours, the German police liquidated the SOW printing house in Warsaw, the ZSP placed one of its own printing houses at the disposal of the anarcho-syndicalists.

=== Warsaw Uprising ===
Members of the SOW and the ZSP fought in two districts of the city. In the Old Town, on August 1, 1944, the 104th Company of Syndicalists was formed, with 280 soldiers. They were the only branch in the district that had its own weapons factory, hospital, bakery, and its own transport of food and medicines. The company's kitchen served free meals for the civilian population. The printing of Iskry and Sprawy was also continued. Black and red ribbons were worn on helmets and caps, which provoked incessant quarrels with the Home Army gendarmerie, which did not recognise the use of various political symbols by insurgent units. The syndicalist company defended several barricades, and its troops were sent to the most threatened resistance points. After 32 days of fighting, only 70-80 company members remained alive. On September 2, they were the last unit to withdraw from the district through the sewers.

At the end of August, a Syndicalist Brigade was established in the Śródmieście district, which was joined by members of the SOW, ZSP and members of the Anarchist Federation of Poland (AFP) who had previously fought in the Home Army (AK) and the Polish People's Army (PAL) units. The black and red flag was recognised as the official colour of the branch. On September 2, they were joined by the survivors of the 104th Company of Syndicalists and a group of Hungarian Jews. The personnel of the brigade increased to 256 people. A collective leadership was created under the Syndicalist Uprising Agreement (SPP), in which anarcho-syndicalists (Tomasz Pilarski, Edward Wołonciej, Paweł Lew Marek) gained the upper hand. The Sydykalista newspaper was published, the editor of which was Marek, the pre-war national secretary of the AFP. The AK command entrusted the brigade with one of the barricades for defence. In mid-September, at the initiative of the SOW, a conference was held with the participation of left-wing parties and the Polish Workers' Party (PPR). Anarcho-syndicalists tried to convince the rest of their "Platform of the Professional Movement in Poland" and the principles of direct democracy, but to no avail.

On October 5, 1944, the uprising capitulated, so the soldiers of Jewish origin were hidden in a well-masked bunker, and the rest went into captivity. On January 18, 1945, they revealed themselves to the Red Army that captured the Pruszków camp where they were held. In December 1945, the civil leadership of the ZSP called on its members to reveal themselves to the communist authorities, which most of them did, although some this resulted in imprisonment.

== Ideology ==
The SOW criticised the ZSP and argued for the creation of a Social Republic, a grassroots federation of workers and local self-governments, which were to replace the existing functions of the state and completely liquidate political power. According to the historian Rafał Chwedoruk, “the programs were only a bit more radical than the ZSP”. The SOW ideology combined the slogans of national and social liberation.
