= Kazimierz Łyszczyński =

Polish philosopher and noble (1634–1689)

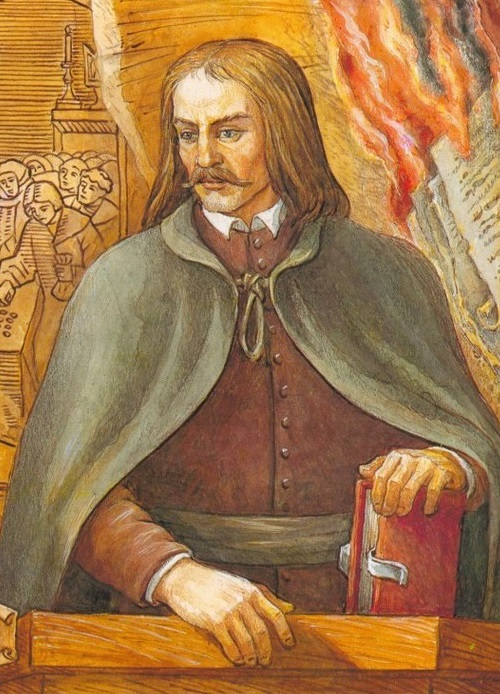
- Born: 4 March 1634; Łyszczyce, Brest, Polish–Lithuanian Commonwealth
- Died: 30 March 1689 (aged 55); Warsaw, Polish–Lithuanian Commonwealth
- Cause of death: Execution
- Other name: Casimir Liszinski
- Occupations: Judge; philosopher; nobleman

Philosophical work
- Era: Age of Enlightenment
- Region: Western philosophy; Polish philosophy
- Main interests: Religious skepticism
- Notable works: On the non-existence of God
- Notable ideas: Atheism in Poland

Kazimierz Łyszczyński (Polish pronunciation: [kaˈʑimjɛʂ wɨˈʂt͡ʂɨj̃skʲi]; 4 March 1634 – 30 March 1689), also known in English as Casimir Liszinski, was a Polish nobleman, philosopher, and soldier in the ranks of the Sapieha family, who was accused, tried, and executed for atheism in 1689.

For eight years he studied philosophy as a Jesuit and then became a podsędek (supply judge) in legal cases against the Jesuits concerning estates. He wrote a treatise entitled On the Non-Existence of God and was later executed on charges of atheism. His trial has been criticised, and is seen as a case of legalised religious murder in Poland.

== Life ==
=== Education and work ===
Coat of Arms of Kazimierz Łyszczyński

Kazimierz Łyszczyński was born in Łyszczyce, in what is now Brest District, Brest Region, Belarus. He became a nobleman, landowner, philosopher, and soldier in the service of the Sapieha family. For eight years he studied philosophy as a Jesuit, but left the order and then became a supply judge (podsędek) in legal cases against the Jesuits concerning estates. He was also member of the Sejm of the Polish–Lithuanian Commonwealth.

Łyszczyński had read a book by Henry Aldsted entitled Theologia Naturalis, which attempted to prove the existence of divinity. Its arguments were so convoluted that Łyszczyński was able to infer many contradictions. Ridiculing Aldsted, Łyszczyński wrote in the book's margins the words "ergo non-est Deus" ("therefore God does not exist").

This was discovered by one of Łyszczyński's debtors, Jan Kazimierz Brzoska, who was the nuncio of Brest in Poland or a Stolnik of Bracławice or Łowczy of Brześć. Brzoska, reluctant to return a great sum of money lent him by Łyszczyński, accused the latter of being an atheist and gave the aforementioned work as evidence to Witwicki, bishop of Poznań. Brzoska also stole and delivered to the court a handwritten copy of De non-existentia Dei, which was the first Polish philosophical treatise presenting reality from an atheistic perspective, and which Łyszczyński had been working on since 1674.

=== Trial ===
Witwicki along with Załuski, bishop of Kiev, took up this case with zeal. King John III Sobieski attempted to help Łyszczyński by ordering that he should be judged at Vilnius, but this could not save Łyszczyński from the clergy. Łyszczyński's first privilege as a Polish noble, that he could not be imprisoned before his condemnation, was violated. The Łyszczyński case was brought before the diet of 1689 where he was accused of having denied the existence of God and having blasphemed against the Virgin Mary and the saints. He was condemned to death for atheism.

=== Execution ===
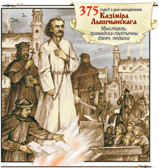
2009 Belarusian drawing of Łyszczyński's execution.

The sentence was carried out before noon in the Old Town Market Place in Warsaw, where his tongue was pulled out followed by a beheading. After that, his corpse was transported beyond the city borders and cremated.

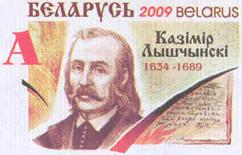
2009 Belarusian stamp in honour of Łyszczyński's 375th birthday.

Bishop Załuski gave the following account of the execution:

After recantation the culprit was conducted to the scaffold, where the executioner tore with a burning iron the tongue and the mouth, with which he had been cruel against God; after which his hands, the instruments of the abominable production, were burnt at a slow fire, the sacrilegious paper was thrown into the flames; finally himself, that monster of his century, this deicide was thrown into the expiatory flames; expiatory if such a crime may be atoned for.

== De non-existentia Dei ==
Łyszczyński wrote a treatise, De non-existentia Dei (On the non-existence of God), stating that God does not exist and that religions are inventions of man.

On the basis of a public denunciation, a trial was conducted before a Sejm commission. There is an actual transcript of the proceedings at the Kórnik library, including a speech by the Grand Duchy of Lithuania Instigator Regni Szymon Kurowicz Zabistowski, citing fragments of De non-existentia Dei. The treatise itself was destroyed by the Sejm, but the surviving cited fragments are as follows:

I – we beseech you, o' theologians, by your God, if in this manner do you not extinguish the light of Reason, do you not oust the sun from this world, do you not pull down your God from the sky, when attributing to him the impossible, whereof the characteristics and attributes contradict themselves.

II – Man is the creator of God, and God is a concept and creation of Man. Hence people are the architects and engineers of God, and God is not a true being but a being existing only within the mind; being chimeric by its nature, because a God and a chimera are the same thing.

III – Religion was constituted by people without religion, so they could be worshipped although the God is not existent. Piety was introduced by the unpietic. The fear of God was spread by the unafraid so that the people were afraid of them in the end. Devotion named godly is a design of Man. Doctrine, be it logical or philosophical, bragging to be teaching the truth of God, is false, and on the contrary, the one condemned as false, is the very true one.

IV – simple folk are cheated by the more cunning with the fabrication of God for their own oppression; whereas the same oppression is shielded by the folk in a way, that if the wise attempted to free them by the truth, they would be quelled by the very people.

V – nevertheless we do not experience within us and within any other such an imperative of reason, which would ensure us of a truth of divine revelation. Alas if they were present in us, then everyone would have to acknowledge them and would have no doubts and would not contradict the Writings of Moses and the Gospels – which is not true – and there would be no different congregations and their followers as Mahomet etc. Such an imperative is not known and there are not only doubts, but there are some who deny a revelation, and they are not fools, but wise men, who with a proper reasoning prove what? the very contrary, what I also prove here. Concluding, that God does not exist.

During his trial, Łyszczyński claimed that the work was to be about a Catholic and an atheist having a debate, in which the Catholic would eventually win (he told the diet that the work would have had a different title from De non-existentia Dei). The atheist was to speak first followed by the Catholic. He claimed that he only wrote the first half of the work (that is only the atheist's argument) and then stopped writing at the advice of a priest.

== Status in modern Poland ==
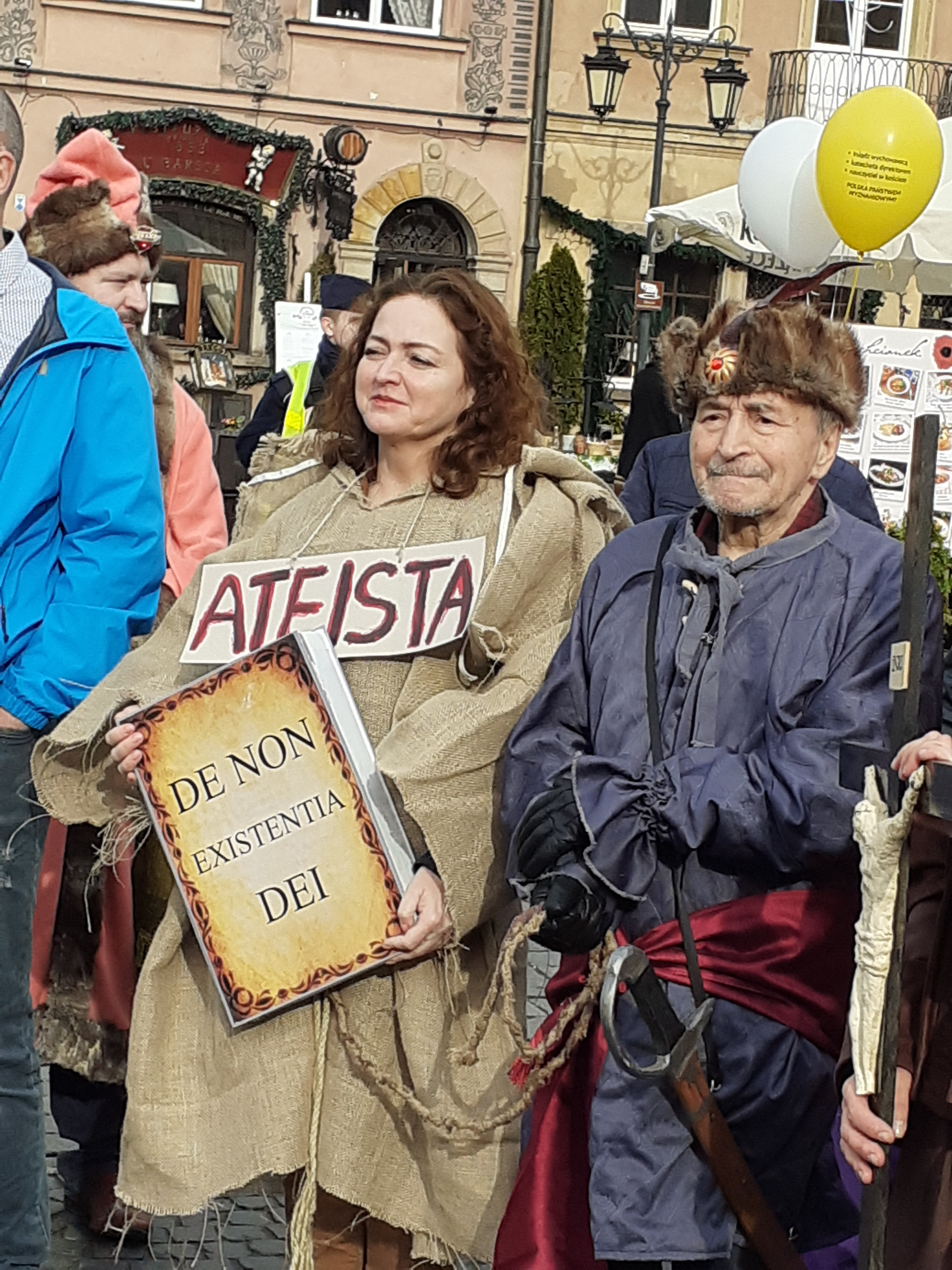
Agnieszka Wołk-Łaniewska as Kazimierz Łyszczyński during the staging of his execution in the Old Town Square in Warsaw (2023).

Regardless of whether Łyszczyński was genuinely an atheist, in communist Poland he came to be celebrated as a martyr to the atheist cause. In a series of papers, the philosopher Andrzej Nowicki presented a romanticized view of Łyszczyński, stating that "in terms of breadth of intellectual horizons, thoroughness of philosophical erudition, and boldness of thought, he was beyond doubt the most eminent Polish mind of the age."

According to Maciej Pomian-Srzednicki (1982), "It appears that Łyszczyński was sentenced to death for writing a treatise entitled 'De non-existentia Dei' ... and all that remains are a few notes which were made during the trial. Apart from this and also the fact that his execution caused some controversy at the time on account of his being a member of the gentry, next to nothing is known about Łyszczyński. Łyszczyński's importance as a martyr of the atheist cause has led to his romanticization by Nowicki and to his rescue from a murky cell in the obscure by-ways of history. A copious amount of writing has appeared concerning both what is not known about him and what the content of his thought might have been. Nowicki writes boldly: 'Polish intellectual life cannot boast of any one figure who could compare with Łyszczyński in terms of breadth of intellectual horizons, the thoroughness of philosophical erudition and the boldness of thought. He was beyond doubt the most eminent Polish mind of the epoch.' What a pity that no one knows what the content of his thought was. According to the notes made at the trial, Łyszczyński, was curiously 'modern', even to the point of incongruity, in his critique of religion: all of his remarks might have been made by Marx or Lenin ... Łyszczyński clearly states his disbelief in God. The incongruity of this idea, however, lies in an inability to understand its genesis in the context of Polish society at that time ... there is no independent or clear evidence of other individuals with similar inclinations during Łyszczyński's time. To say that Łyszczyński was simply ahead of his time means nothing: it is an admission of the unavailability of an explanation." (Pomian-Srzednicki 1982, pp. 103–104)

In March 2014, his persona and ideas were the key theme in a public performance during the 2014 Procession of Atheists in Poland, during which his execution was reenacted.

== See also ==
- Enlightenment in Poland
- History of philosophy in Poland
- Irreligion in Poland
- Religion in Lithuania
- Religion in Belarus
- Religion in Poland
