= Zofia Hajkowicz-Brodzikowska =

Polish anarchist

- Born: Zofia Hajkowicz; February 24, 1913; Warsaw, Congress Poland
- Died: January 8, 1944 (aged 30); Warschau, General Government
- Other name: Basia
- Organization: AFP
- Spouse: Witold Brodzikowski
- Resistance
- Allegiance: ZSP
- Affiliation: Polish resistance movement
- Service years: 1940-1943
- Unit: SOW

Zofia Hajkowicz-Brodzikowska (February 24, 1913 – January 8, 1944) was a Polish anarcho-syndicalist who participated in the Polish resistance against Nazism, and was on the Central Committee of the Syndicalist Organization "Freedom" (SOW).

== Biography ==
Hajkowicz-Brodzikowska was born in 1913, the daughter of a professor who worked at a polytechnic in Mokotowska Street in Warsaw. After finishing secondary school, she studied theatre and journalism at university level. Around this time she became a member of the Anarchist Federation of Poland.

In 1938, Hajkowicz-Brodzikowska became employed at a syndicalist educational institute and worked as an editor of its publications. She was also a member of the Union of Trade Unions to which her employer was affiliated.

=== WWII ===
From 1940, Hajkowicz-Brodzikowska led the Central Committee of SOW alongside fellow anarchist Wiesław Protschke. According to an account written by Paweł Marek she was responsible for the organisation's internal and external communications, including liasing with the Provisional Committee to Aid Jews, as well as printing SOW's propaganda, producing counterfeit documents, and smuggling weapons.

Sometime between December 1943 and January 1944, Hajkowicz-Brodzikowska was arrested in the Ochota district whilst in possession of weapons. She was detained and tortured at Pawiak prison. In a later biography Marek claimed that she was likely betrayed by the Gestapo informant Cezary Ketling-Szemley.

=== Death ===
The exact circumstances of Hajkowicz-Brodzikowska's death are unclear. The Mausoleum of Struggle and Martyrdom claims she died as a direct result of her torture at the SiPo headquarters, at the site of the museum, on 8 January 1944. However, other sources state that she committed suicide whilst still in Pawiak.
