= Syndicalist Brigade =

- Brygada Syndykalistyczna
- Red and black flag of the Brigade
- Active: September 2, 1944–December 1945
- Disbanded: October 4, 1944
- Country: Poland
- Allegiance: Syndicalist Uprising Agreement
- Branch: Polish People's Army
- Size: 256
- Garrison/HQ: Śródmieście, Warsaw
- Engagements: Operation Tempest of the Eastern Front of World War II: Warsaw Uprising

Commanders
- Captain: Edward "Czemier" Wołonciej

The Syndicalist Brigade was a military unit composed of activists from the Union of Polish Syndicalists (ZSP) and the Syndicalist Organization "Freedom" (SWO) and some soldiers of the 104th Company of Syndicalists, which was disbanded on September 6, 1944. (Note: With time, Hungarian and Greek Jews joined the unit.) The branch took part in the Warsaw Uprising in the Śródmieście district.

The brigade was operationally subordinate to the Polish People's Army, but belonged to the Syndicalist Uprising Agreement. At the end of the uprising, on October 3, it had 250 people.

== History ==
The Syndicalist Brigade was established on September 2, 1944, under the command of Captain Edward "Czemier" Wołonciej. It was joined by members of the SOW, ZSP and members of the Anarchist Federation of Poland (AFP) rescued from the ghetto, who had previously fought in the Home Army (AK) and the Polish People's Army (PAL). The black and red flag was recognized as the official color of the branch. On September 2, they were joined by the survivors of the 104th Company of Syndicalists and a group of Hungarian Jews. At that time, the brigade's staff increased to 256 people.

The headquarters of the brigade was located in a tenement house at ul. Marszałkowska 57 (former Imperial cinema). It consisted of two assault platoons, one supply platoon, as well as gendarmerie and communications. The brigade published the Sydykalista bulletin, (Note: Former organ of the Polish Syndicalist Union and 104th Company of Syndicalists.) whose editor was Paweł Lew Marek and organized a canteen for civilians. (Note: Food and vodka were obtained from German warehouses.)

During the uprising, a collective leadership was created as part of the Syndicalist Uprising Agreement (SPP), in which anarcho-syndicalists (Tomasz Pilarski, Edward Wołłonszym, Paweł Lew Marek) gained the upper hand. The AK command entrusted the brigade with one of the barricades for defense. In mid-September, at the initiative of the SOW, a conference was held with the participation of left-wing parties and the Stalinist Polish Workers' Party (PPR). Anarcho-syndicalists tried to convince the rest of their "Platform of the Professional Movement in Poland" and the principles of direct democracy, but were unsuccessful.

After the fall of the uprising, a small part of the unit got to the right side of the Vistula, while the larger part left the city with the civilian population or were captured. The remaining members hid on October 5 in the basement of the house at ul. Śliska 7. In December 1945, the civil leadership of the ZSP called on its members to reveal themselves to the communist authorities, which most of them did, although some overpaid it with prison sentences.

== See also ==
- Anarchism in Poland

== Bibliography ==
- Marek, Paweł Lew (2006). "Suplement C: Organizacje". Na krawędzi życia: wspomnienia anarchisty z lat 1943-44 (in Polish). Kraków: Wydawnictwo „Dąb”. ISBN 8392224418. OCLC 169872605.
