= Polish Association of Free Thought =

Polish Association of Free Thought (PAFT) (Polish: Polski Związek Myśli Wolnej (PZMW)) was a secular movement, founded in 1926 by a group of former activists of the Polish Association of Freethinkers. The chairman was Zygmunt Radliński, and the board included: Tadeusz Kotarbiński, Józef Landau. In June 1930 PAFT organized in Warsaw Circle of Intellectuals (under the leadership of T. Kotarbinski), which primary aim was to deepen the theoretical principles of free thought and to create a center, grouping intellectuals – thinkers from around the country. From October 1930 to December 1935, the Circle published its own monthly magazine "Rationalist" edited by Józef Landau.

The association was banned by the Polish authorities in 1936. In 1946, the organization was once again reestablished only to be banned again in 1951. In 1957, two state approved organizations were founded, The Association of Atheists and Free Thinkers and the Society of the Secular School, which were the unofficial successors of the association.

== Literature ==
- Polish tradition of secular movement (in Polish)
- PNA. One hundred years of struggle for freedom of conscience (in Polish)
