= Wiech Park =

Urban park in Warsaw, Poland

Stefan Wiechecki "Wiech" Park
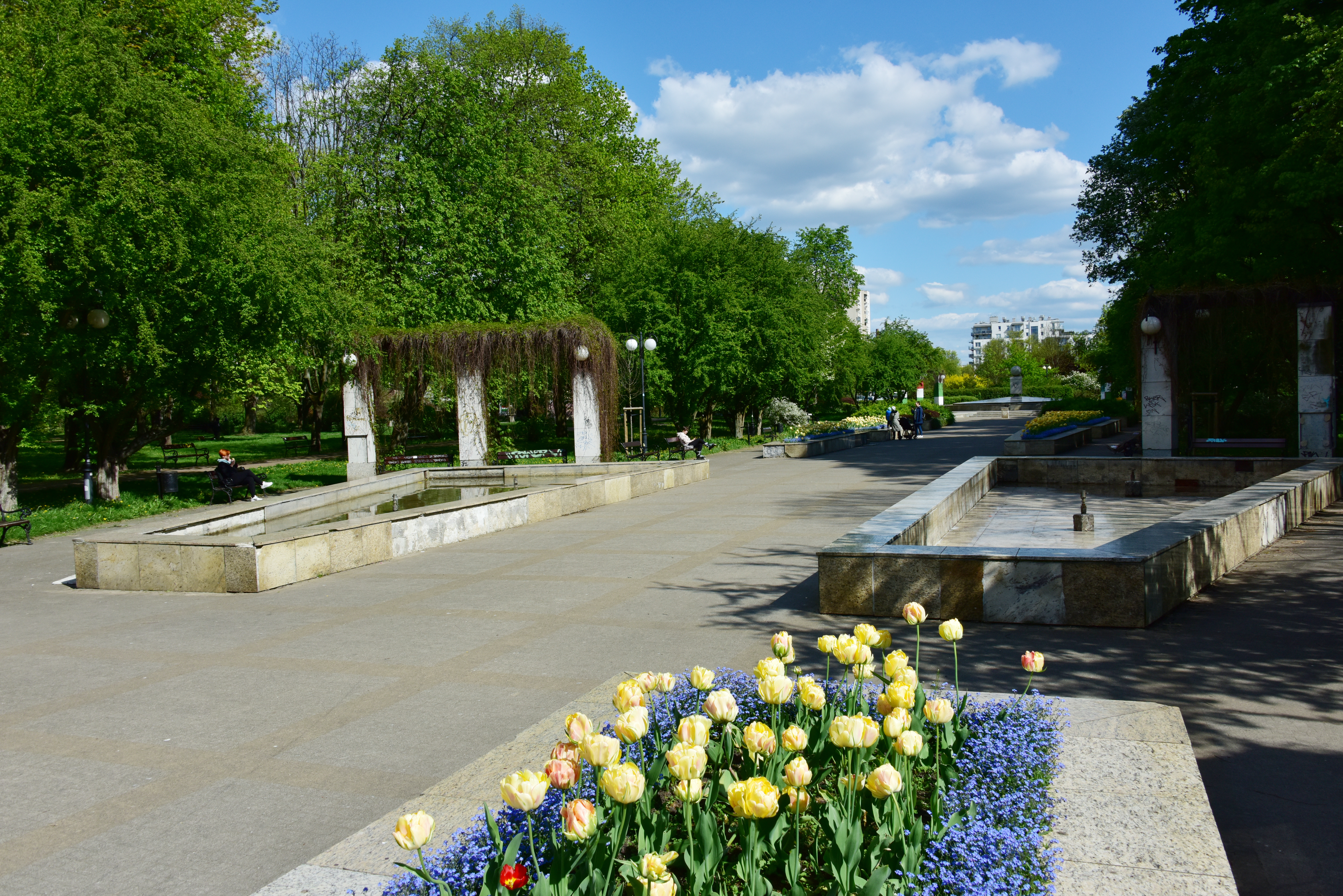
- Main park avenue in 2023.
- Interactive map of Stefan Wiechecki "Wiech" Park
- Type: Urban park
- Location: Targówek, Warsaw, Poland
- Coordinates: 52°16′22″N 21°03′03″E
- Area: 5.9 hectares (15 acres)
- Created: 1963

The Stefan Wiechecki "Wiech" Park, (Note: Polish: Park im. Stefana Wiecheckiego „Wiecha”) also simply known as the Wiech Park, (Note: Polish: Park Wiecha) is an urban park in Warsaw, Poland, located in the district of Targówek, between Kołowa, Remiszewska, Ossowskiego, and Handlowa Streets. It was opened in 1963.

== Name ==
The park was named after Stefan Wiechecki (penname: Wiech), a 20th-century writer and journalist.

== History ==
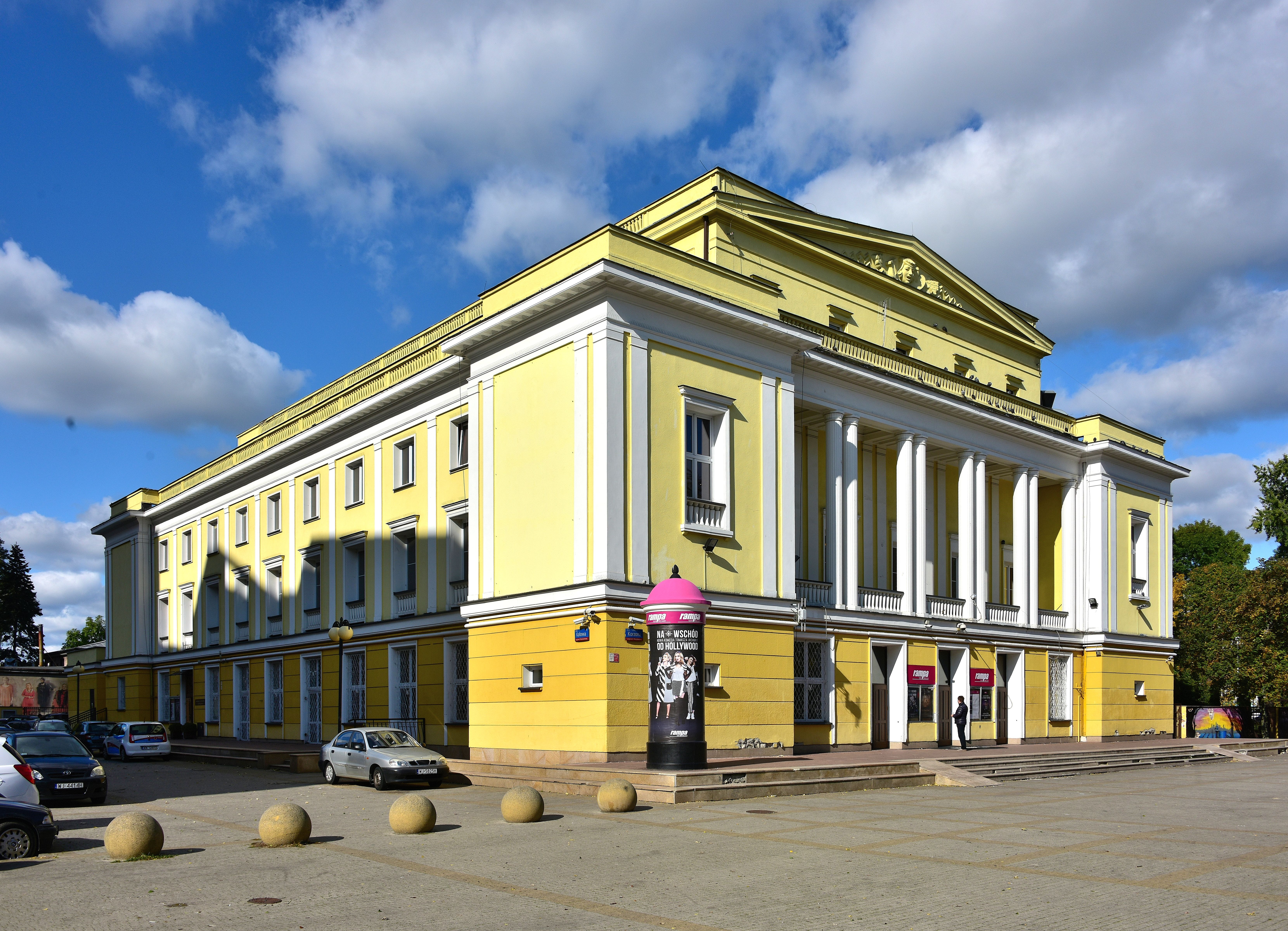
The Rampa Theatre in the Wiech Park, open in 1975.

The park was developed between 1961 and 1963, around the building of the Targówek Cultural Centre. In 1975, the building was turned into the Rampa Theatre.

The park was renovated between 2001 and 2006, with the addition of new pergolas, fountains, and a sundial.

== Characteristics ==
The park is placed in the district of Targówek, between Kołowa, Remiszewska, Ossowskiego, and Handlowa Streets. It has the total area of 5.8 ha. In the park is located the Rampa Theatre.
