= Concretism =

Concretism may refer to one of the following

- Concrete art, a form of abstractionism
- Concrete poetry
- Gutai Art Association, a group of artists who pursued another form of 'concrete' (gutai) art
- Reism, a philosophical movement
- Concretism (psychology), a form of thought and feeling that represents concrete concepts related to sensation as opposed to abstractions, see Attitude (psychology)
- Reification (fallacy)
