= Wolberg =

Wolberg is a surname. Notable people with the surname include:

- Aniela Wolberg (1907–1937), Polish anarchist
- Lewis Wolberg (1905–1988), American psychoanalyst
- Pavel Wolberg (born 1966), visual artist, photographer and photojournalist
