= Stefan Szwedowski =

Polish anarcho-syndicalist (1891–1973)

Personal details
- Born: December 26, 1891 Piotrków, Poland
- Died: May 27, 1973 (aged 81) Warsaw, Poland
- Resting place: Powązki Cemetery (section 284b-1-1)
- Parents: Dominik Szwedowski (father); Urszula Witkowski (mother)
- Education: University of Warsaw
- Occupation: Trade unionist
- Nickname: Wojciech

Military service
- Allegiance: Poland
- Branch/service: Home Army
- Years of service: 1915-1918; 1943-1944
- Rank: Lieutenant
- Unit: Polish Military Organisation (1915-1918); 104th Company of Syndicalists (1943-1944)
- Battles/wars: World War I World War II: Warsaw Uprising
- Awards: Order of Polonia Restituta (10 November 1928); Cross of Independence (12 May 1931); Cross of Valour; Cross of Merit (11 November 1937)

Stefan Szwedowski (26 December 1891, Piotrków - 27 May 1973, Warsaw) was an anarcho-syndicalist activist and a participant in the Warsaw Uprising.

== Biography ==
In October 1939, Szwedowski was one of the founders of the Union of Polish Syndicalists (ZSP), and from 1943 he was the chief secretary of the ZSP. He was also a representative of the Żegota Council to Aid Jews. From 1942, he organized the secret Polish Western Union. In February 1944, he became vice-president of the Centralisation of the Democratic, Socialist and Syndicalist Parties. He fought in the Warsaw Uprising as a lieutenant in the ranks of the 104th Company of Syndicalists.

After the war, he worked together with other syndicalists in the "Word" Publishing Cooperative in Łódź, which operated until 1948, and then in other worker cooperatives. In 1950, the Security Office undertook investigative measures against Szwedowski, to prepare a trial for organizing a "conspiracy in the communist leadership during the Second World War." In July 1953, a decision was made to arrest him. However, there is no information about Szwedowski's stay in prison. In 1973, just before Szwedowski's death, the Ministry of Public Security considered taking steps to take over the archive of the syndicalist movement he owned.

== Bibliography ==
- Latos, Tomasz (2014). "Stefan Szwedowski". In Romanowski, Andrzej (ed.). Polski Słownik Biograficzny (in Polish). Vol. 49. Warsaw: Polish Academy of Sciences. pp. 469–472. ISBN 978-83-63352-25-7. OCLC 931492268.
- Zackiewicz, Grzegorz (2013). Syndykalizm w polskiej refleksji i rzeczywistości politycznej I połowy XX wieku (in Polish). Kraków: Wydawnictwo Avalon T. Janowski. ISBN 978-83-7730-088-6. OCLC 865069106.
