= Andrzej Nowicki (philosopher) =

Polish philosopher, poet, and diplomat (1919–2011)

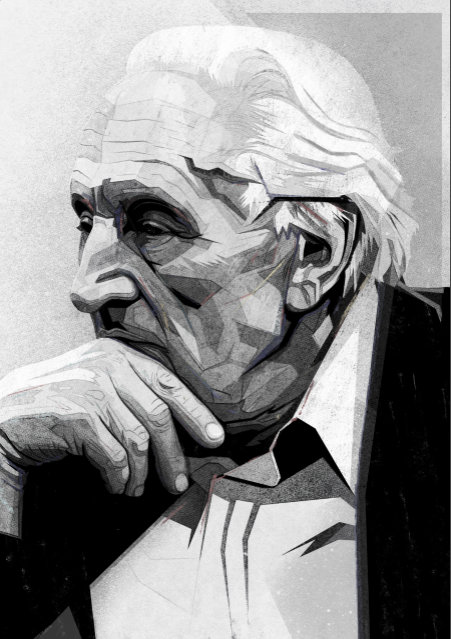
- Born: 27 May 1919; Warsaw, Poland
- Died: 1 December 2011 (aged 92)

Education
- Education: University of Warsaw

Philosophical work
- Era: 20th-century philosophy
- Institutions: University of Warsaw (1952–63); University of Wrocław (1963–73); Maria Curie-Skłodowska University in Lublin (1973–91)

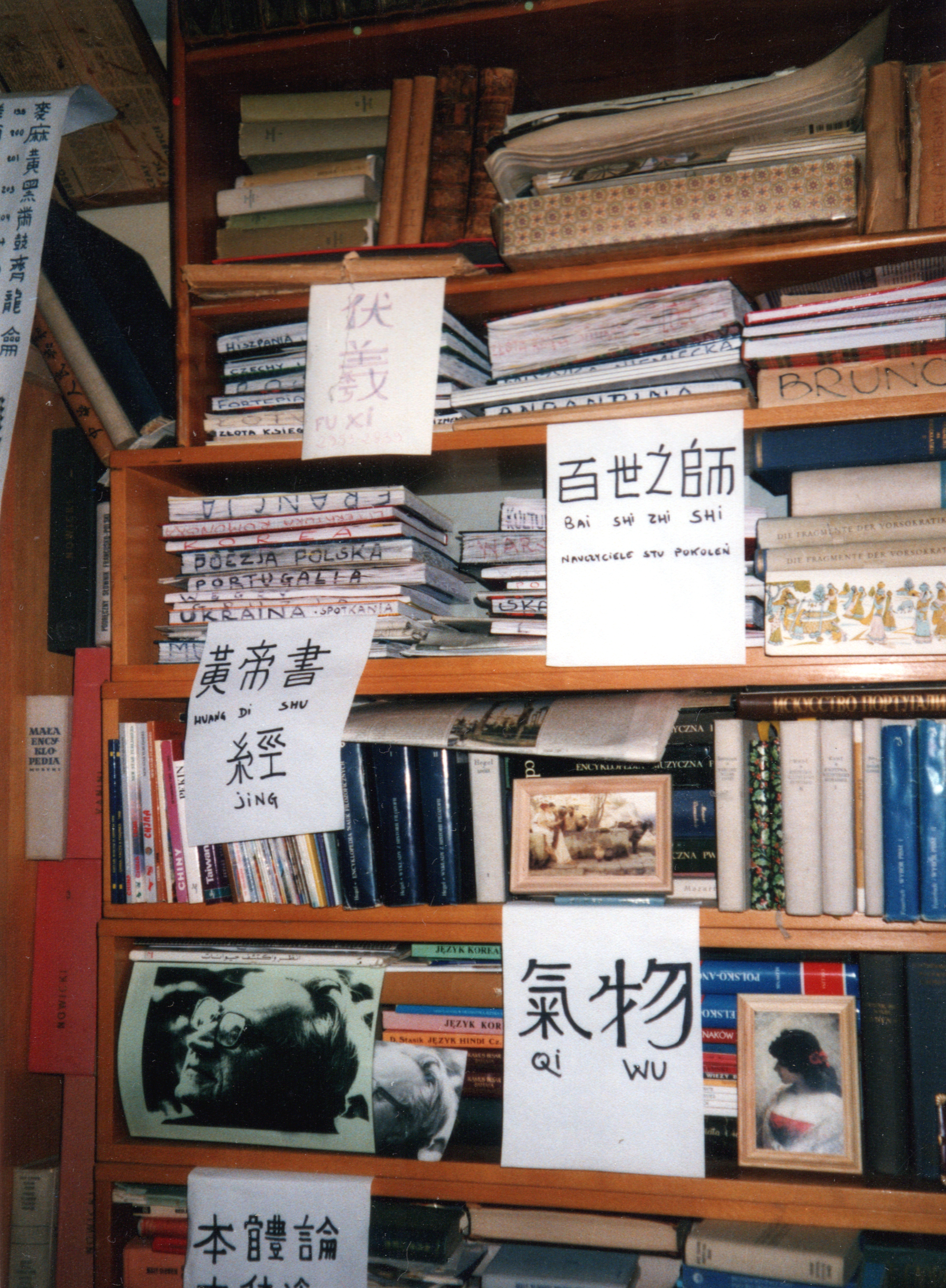
Part of Nowicki's library with label's in Chinese showing the interest in the language he developed in his later years.

Andrzej Rusław Fryderyk Nowicki (27 May 1919 – 1 December 2011) was a Polish philosopher of culture, a specialist in the history of philosophy and of atheism, in Italian philosophy of the Renaissance and in religious studies and Grand Master of the Grand East of Poland and a connoisseur of the fine arts, poet and diplomat.

In the years 1937–1939 he studied philosophy, psychology and Italian studies at the University of Warsaw. He resumed his studies in philosophy during the World War II in underground education. His teachers were, among others: Tadeusz Kotarbiński, Władysław Tatarkiewicz, Władysław Witwicki.

Nowicki conceived his own philosophical system which he called "the ergantropic and incontrological (Polish: ergantropijno-inkontrologiczny) philosophical system of meetings within things". He worked as an academic at the University of Warsaw (1952–1963), the University of Wrocław (1963–1973), the Maria Curie-Skłodowska University in Lublin (1973–1991) and achieved the rank of a professor.

He was co-founder and chairman of the Association of Atheists and Freethinkers and of the Polish Association for Religious Studies. He was a member of the committee of the Front of National Unity in 1958. He was the founder and editor-in-chief of the "Euhemer" magazine. He was the grandmaster of the Grand Orient of Poland in 1997–2002.

Later in his life he developed an interest in the Chinese language.

== Books ==
- Papieże przeciw Polsce. Doświadczenia dziesięciu stuleci naszych dziejów. Książka i Wiedza. 1949.
- Kopernik – człowiek Odrodzenia. Wiedza Powszechna. 1953.
- Podróż w świat średniowiecznych cudów. Wiedza Powszechna. 1954. 1956.
- Wykłady z historii filozofii i myśli społecznej Odrodzenia. Państwowe Wydawnictwo Naukowe. 1956.
- Grzegorz z Sanoka, 1406–1477. Państwowe Wydawnictwo Naukowe. 1958.
- Starożytni o religii. Polskie Towarzystwo Religioznawcze. 1959.
- Centralne kategorie filozofii Giordana Bruna. Państwowe Wydawnictwo Naukowe. 1962.
- Wypisy z historii krytyki religii. Książka i Wiedza. 1962.
- Wykłady o krytyce religii. Książka i Wiedza. 1963.
- Ateizm. Iskry. 1964.
- Wykłady o krytyce religii w Polsce. Książka i Wiedza. 1965.
- Filozofia włoskiego Odrodzenia. Państwowe Wydawnictwo Naukowe. 1967.
- Centralne kategorie filozofii Vaniniego. Państwowe Wydawnictwo Naukowe. 1970.
- Filozofia francuskiego Odrodzenia. Państwowe Wydawnictwo Naukowe. 1973.
- Człowiek w świecie dzieł. Państwowe Wydawnictwo Naukowe. 1974.
- Ostatnia noc Vaniniego. Katowice. 1976.
- Współczesna filozofia włoska. Państwowe Wydawnictwo Naukowe. 1977.
- Portrety filozofów w poezji, malarstwie i muzyce. Wydawnictwo Lubelskie. 1978.
- Giordano Bruno. Wiedza Powszechna. 1979.
- Lampa trzydziestu spotkań. Katowice. 1980.
- Nauczyciele. Lublin. 1981.
- Witwicki. Wiedza Powszechna. 1982.
- Uczeń Twardowskiego. Władysław Witwicki. Katowice. 1983.
- Czas i człowiek. Nasza Księgarnia. 1983.
- Zarys dziejów krytyki religii. Starożytność. 1986.
- Vanini. Wiedza Powszechna. 1987.
- Kazimierz Łyszczyński. Towarzystwo Krzewienia Kultury Świeckiej. 1989.
- Spotkania w rzeczach. PWN. 1991.
- Filozofia masonerii u progu siódmego tysiąclecia. Gdynia. 1997.
