= Freda Hoffman Zgodzinski =

Polish anarchist activist

- Portrait of Hoffman Zgodzinski, Warsaw May 1939
- Born: Freda Hoffman; February 8, 1914; Wielkie Oczy, Kingdom of Galicia and Lodomeria, Cisleithania
- Died: February 21, 2012 (aged 98); Montreal, Quebec, Canada
- Other names: Franka Hoffman-Zgodzińska; Fryda Hofman Zgodzińska; Franciszka Łańcucka
- Citizenship: Canadian
- Notable work: My Struggles 1939-1945 Under the German Occupation of Poland
- Movement: Anarchism
- Spouse: Stefan "Shulim" Zgodzinski

Freda Hoffman Zgodzinski (8 February 1914 - 21 February 2012) was a Polish Jewish anarchist, a militant in the Anarchist Federation of Poland, and publisher of the Yiddish language Kul fun Frayhayt newspaper produced in the Warsaw Ghetto.

== Biography ==
=== Early life ===
Hoffman Zgodzinski was raised in a Jewish family in the Polish village of Wielkie Oczy. The second youngest of 8 children, her parents, David and Scheindl, were poor and made a living from selling goods in local markets, and occasional smuggling of contraband products such as saccharin. Because of the family's poverty all of Hoffman Zgodzinski's siblings emigrated to larger cities, such as Lwów, Przemyśl, Tarnów and Warsaw, in search of work. After nursing her mother through ill health Hoffman Zgodzinski also moved to Warsaw.

=== WWII ===
At the outbreak of World War II Hoffman Zgodzinski was living in a fourth floor flat at 42 Leszno Street in Wola, occupied by four other tenants including her elder sisters Esther and Rose. As the Siege of Warsaw began they burnt all the books in their residence in order to avoid being persecuted for their political sympathies. The location of her residence was situated within the boundary of what became the Warsaw Ghetto. As conditions worsened in the Ghetto Hoffman Zgodzinski escaped, travelling to the countryside around Lublin by foot to work illegally as a farm labourer. However, she would later return to the Ghetto.

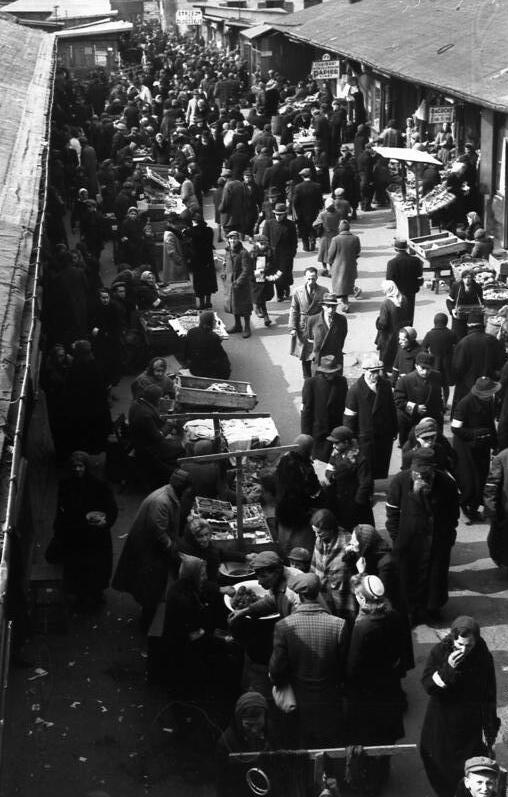
A view of the market at the rear of Leszno Street that Hoffman Zgodzinski would traverse in order to avoid German soldiers on the main thoroughfare. Photographed from the back of the building that she lived in.

On her return Hoffman Zgodzinski sustained herself working at a Többens factory producing garments for the German army. Back inside the Ghetto she was able to communicate to relatives outside through family friend Bernard Konrad Świerczyński, who would smuggle letters into the Ghetto. Following the start of the Grossaktion Hoffman Zgodzinski helped an acquaintance to smuggle their child out of the Umschlagplatz, and later her own niece out of the Ghetto. She was able to avoid being transported to Treblinka herself due to her factory job, and later escaped from transportation to a work camp by jumping off a train.

Returning to Warsaw, Hoffman Zgodzinski went into hiding with the help of Świerczyński. She survived by getting work as a servant under the Polish pseudonym Franciszka Łańcucka. Following the Warsaw Uprising she was sent to a transit camp, Durchgangslager 121, in Pruszków from which she escaped, before being recaptured, sent to a camp in Częstochowa, and once again escaping. After the Allied liberation of Poland Hoffman Zgodzinski was able to return to Warsaw then Łódź from where she traced her few surviving relatives.

=== Post-war ===
After the end of the war Hoffman Zgodzinski moved to Paris, France to live with her sister before emigrating to Canada with her two surviving siblings.

=== Death ===
Hoffman Zgodzinski passed away in Montreal on 21 February 2012.
