= Auctor =

Auctor may refer to:

- An author of a work, who is proficient in the subject matter
- A scientist who first describes a species or other taxon
- The seller at an auction
- Auctor Corporation, trade name for ACC Microelectronics, a defunct American semiconductor company
- Octroi (Auctor), a local tax
- Saint Auctor (c. 451), a bishop of Metz

== See also ==
- Auctoritas
- Auctorum
- Instigator (disambiguation)
