= Grypsera =

Polish prison slang language

- Drugie życie
- Native to: Poland
- Region: Warsaw
- Language family: Indo-European: Balto-Slavic; Slavic; West Slavic; Lechitic; Polish; Grypsera

Language codes
- ISO 639-3: –
- Glottolog: None

Grypsera (Polish pronunciation: [ɡrɨˈpsɛra]: from Low German Grips meaning "intelligence", "cleverness"; also drugie życie, literally "second life" in Polish) is a distinct nonstandard dialect or prison slang of the Polish language, used traditionally by recidivist prison inmates.

It evolved in the 19th century in the areas of Congress Poland: it is said to have originated in Gęsiówka, a prison in Warsaw. The basic substrate of the dialect is Polish, but there are many notable influences (mostly lexical) from other languages used in Polish lands at that time, most notably Yiddish and German, but also some Lithuanian, Ukrainian, Russian, Greek and Latin. It was also heavily influenced by various regional dialects of the Polish language, most notably the Bałak jargon of Lwów and the Warsaw dialect.

Initially, it served the role of a cant, or "secret language", but in the late 19th century, it became a standard sociolect of criminals. Grypsera is constantly evolving to maintain the status of a language understood only by a select group of inmates and not by the wardens or informers. That makes it currently one of the lexically richest dialects of Polish. Also, it is not possible to prepare a comprehensive dictionary of the dialect since it differs from prison to prison.

Phonetically, Grypsera is similar to the Warsaw dialect and shares its most notable features of assimilation of ⟨i⟩ [i] into ⟨y⟩ [ɨ] and the disappearance of nasal vowels, especially in word-final syllables.

== Sample vocabulary ==
- Adela: prostitute (from Polish)
- Adinoczka: a single prison cell (from Russian)
- Ajencel: a single prison cell (from German)
- Ajnbruch: breaking into a cash register (from German)
- Dzieci naczelnika: lice (from Polish)
- Frajer: an outsider, someone who does not speak Grypsera (from Yiddish)
- Giwera: gun (from Yiddish)
- Gold: to welcome someone (from English)
- Kulak: economic criminal (from Russian)
- Ogrodnik: village thief (from Polish)
- Pinkel: stolen money or goods from a crime (from German)
- Pokupka: theft (from Russian)
- Pomarańczyk: homosexual (from Polish)
- Return: self-defense of criminals against police officers (from English)
- Szopenfeld: theft committed in a shop while the shop assistant is present (from Yiddish)

== See also ==
- Symmetry
