= Romuald Minkiewicz =

Polish biologist, zoologist, writer

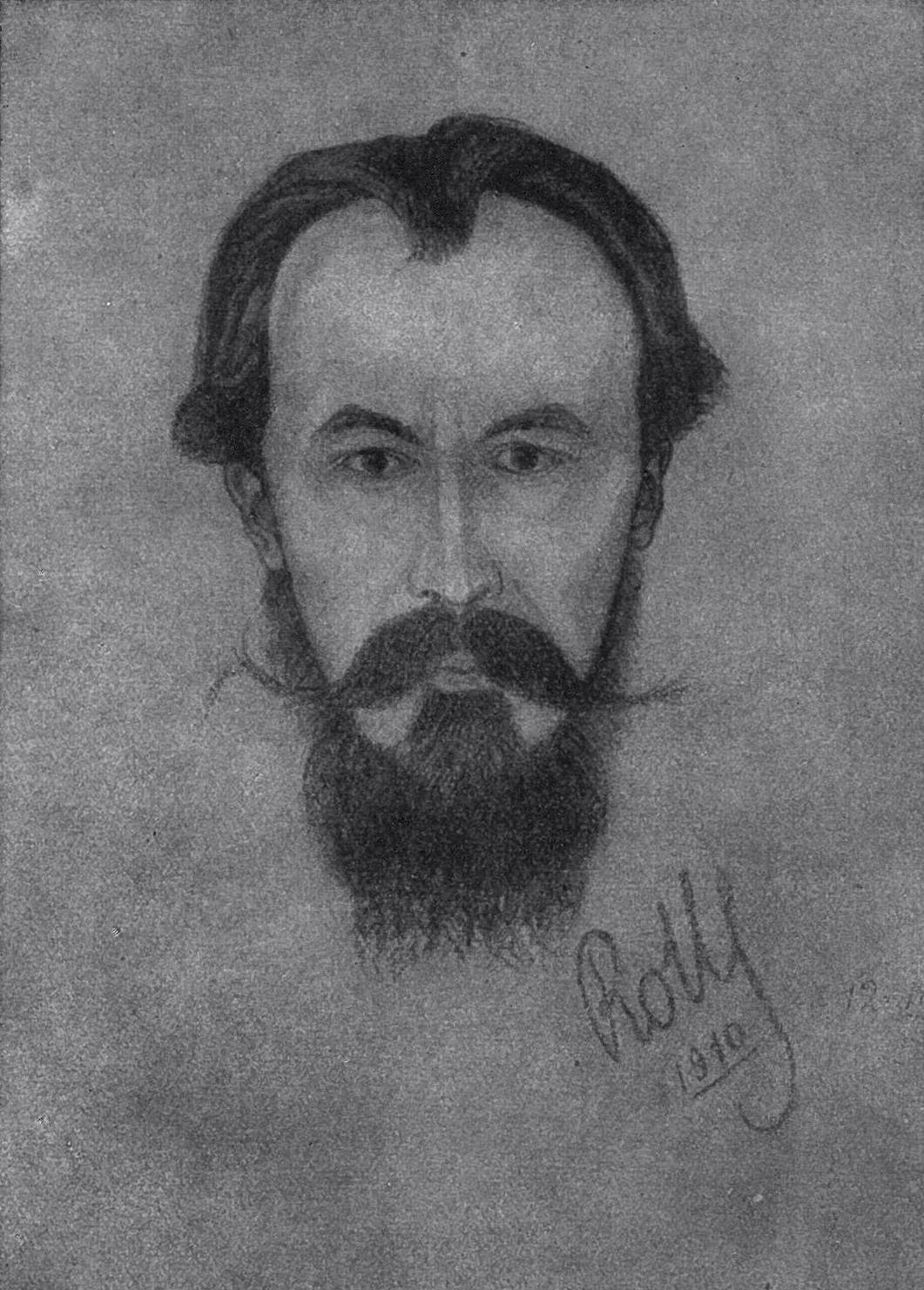
Romuald Minkiewicz self portrait, 1911

Romuald Kazimierz Minkiewicz (27 January 1878 – 25 August 1944) was a Polish biologist, zoologist and botanist as well a writer, poet and social activist.

== Biography ==
Romuald Minkiewicz was born in to the family of a state tax official. His younger brother was the future General Henryk. After graduating from high school he went to St. Petersburg and studied natural sciences at the St. Petersburg University. From 1898, he was active in the Polish Socialist Party, for which he was arrested twice. In 1900, he received his graduation diploma and moved to Kazan University, where for four years he was an assistant at the Department of Zoology and Comparative Anatomy. He conducted hydrobiological research in the freshwater station in Bologoje, and then in the saltwater stations in Sevastopol, Banyuls-sur-Mer and Villefranche-sur-Mer. In 1904, he defended his doctoral thesis and went to Warsaw. For his participation in the 1905 Revolution, he was arrested and imprisoned in the Citadel but released due to lack of evidence. From 1905 he worked again at the Villefranche sur Mer station for a year and then decided to remain in exile. Initially he worked at the station in Roscoff and Monaco, and then stayed in Paris and Brussels.

In 1917 he moved to Warsaw, where for a year he was employed at the Department of Physiology of the Society for Scientific Courses. From November 1918, he worked scientifically in the Department of General Biology of the Warsaw Scientific Society, which he established and headed.

Minkiewicz was a leading activist in the freedom of thought movement. He was a co-founder of the Polish Association of Freethinkers in 1920 and in 1921 he established a non-denominational commune in Warsaw and was its chairman for a short time. He also founded the organ of the Association of Freethinkers "Myśl Wolna" in 1922.

He workers at the Nencki Institute of Experimental Biology and was its chairman from 1926to 1931 and a member of its presidium from 1920 to 1939. From 1920 to 1924 he co-organized the first Polish Hydrobiological Station of the Nencki Institute on Wigry. He dealt with animal ethology and the physiology of perception.

Minkiewicz was also involved in literary work. He made his debut as a poet in 1903. He published his poems and dramas in the Young Poland style in various magazines. He was also a member of the Trade Union of Polish Writers.

During the period of Nazi occupation of Poland, Minkiewicz mostly dedicated himself to private scholarship. He died as a result of a gunshot to the knee during the Warsaw Uprising and was buried at the Czerniakowski Cemetery.
