= Instigator =

An instigator is a person who intentionally encourages or starts something. The term may also refer to:

- Instigator Regni, a prosecutor's office
- Instigator (album), by Kaci Brown
- The Instigator, an album by Rhett Miller
- "Instigator", a song by D12 from Devil's Night

== See also ==
- Instigators, English anarcho-punk band
- The Instigators, 2024 American heist comedy film
