= Kazimierz Pasenkiewicz =

Polish logician (1897–1995)

- Born: 27 September 1897; Kyiv
- Died: 21 June 1995 (aged 97); Kraków
- Occupation: Logician

Academic background
- Education: University of Warsaw
- Doctoral advisor: Tadeusz Kotarbiński

Kazimierz Pasenkiewicz (27 September 1897 – 21 June 1995) was a logician, voivode of Kraków (1946–1951), member of Central Committee of the Polish United Workers' Party (1948–1952).

== Biography ==
Son of Stanisław and Maria. He was a political officer of People's Army. He was buried at the Rakowicki Cemetery.

== Works ==
- Pierwsze systemy semantyki Leona Chwistka. Kraków. 1961.
- Logika ogólna. Vol. 1. Warszawa, Kraków. 1963. Textbook.
- Logika ogólna. Vol. 2. Warszawa, Kraków. 1965. Textbook.

== Bibliography ==
- Janusz Kutta, ed. (1997). Bydgoski słownik biograficzny. Vol. IV. Bydgoszcz: Kujawsko-Pomorskie Towarzystwo Kulturalne, Wojewódzki Ośrodek Kultury w Bydgoszczy. pp. 79–81. ISBN 83-85327-42-8.
- Grygierzec, Ewa (2011). "Pasenkiewicz Kazimierz". In Andrzej Maryniarczyk (ed.). Encyklopedia filozofii polskiej. Vol. 2. Lublin: Polskie Towarzystwo Tomasza z Akwinu. p. 304. ISBN 9788360144466.
- "Kazimierz Pasenkiewicz". Ruch Filozoficzny. LIII (2–3): 464. 1996.
