= Kazimierz Zakrzewski =

Polish historian and publicist

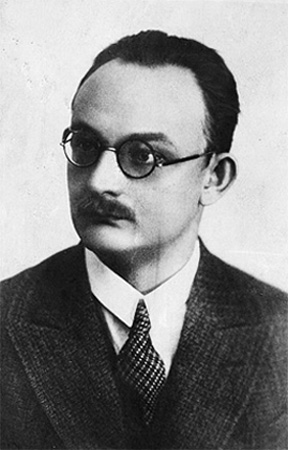
- Born: November 4, 1900; Kraków, Poland
- Died: March 11, 1941 (aged 40); Palmiry, Poland
- Occupations: Historian, publicist

Kazimierz Zakrzewski (November 4, 1900 in Kraków – March 11, 1941 in Palmiry) was a Polish historian, journalist and publicist, a professor of the University of Warsaw. Zakrzewski was a co-originator of the Polish syndicalist movement, activist of the trade union Związek Związków Zawodowych, and researcher of ancient history (mainly late-ancient) and the Byzantine culture. He wrote Historia Bizancjum ("History of the Byzantine Empire") and co-authored the Polish popular history encyclopedia Wielka historia powszechna. During World War II, Zakrzewski was murdered by the Germans in a mass execution at Palmiry.
