= Kazimierz Puczyński =

Polish Hydraulic engineer

- Born: March 3, 1908; Łowicz, Congress Poland
- Died: September 26, 2007 (aged 99); Warsaw, Poland
- Resting place: Powązki Military Cemetery
- Other name: Wroński
- Education: Warsaw University of Technology
- Occupation: Hydraulic engineer
- Spouse: Janina Józefa née Bobowska

Kazimierz Puczyński (nom de guerre Wroński) was a Polish hydrotechnology specialist, graduate of the Warsaw University of Technology with engineering degree, soldier of the Polish Underground State, participant of the Warsaw Uprising.

He was born in 1908, and some time in the interwar period, he graduated from the University of Technology in Warsaw. During the Warsaw Uprising he was commandant of the 104th Company of Syndicalists. After the war, Puczyński worked in the Engineering Office in Warsaw as well as the Hydrology Magazine. He died on September 26, 2007, in Warsaw and was buried at the Powązki Military Cemetery.

== See also ==
- Polish contribution to World War II
