= Rationalist (magazine) =

Polish magazine

- Editor: Józef Landau
- Publisher: Warszawskie Koło Intelektualistów
- First issue: October 1930
- Final issue: December 1935
- Country: Poland
- Based in: Warsaw
- Language: Polish

Rationalist (Polish: Racjonalista) was a Polish magazine published in Warsaw from October 1930 to December 1935 by the Warsaw Circle of Intellectuals, Polish Association of Free Thought.

Editor and publisher of "rationalist" was Józef Landau. The leading publicists were: Tadeusz Kotarbiński, Henryk Ułaszyn, and Józef Landau.
