= Podsędek =

Historical judicial post in Poland and Lithuania

Podsędek (Latin: 'subiudex'; literally: sub-judge) was a judicial position in the history of Poland and Grand Duchy of Lithuania. The role and importance of this official varied over time.

In early Poland, it was an official at the prince's house court (sąd dworski, in curiae).

From the 14th century it was a deputy (but not a subordinate) of a land judge.

In Napoleonic Poland (Duchy of Warsaw) the position of podsędek was that of a court clerk and notary combined in courts of the peace (lower courts). His duties included handling the cases which amounted to the "acts of goodwill": sale/purchase contracts, inheritance, power of attorney, marriage/divorce, etc.
