= Warsaw dialect =

Variety of Polish spoken in Warsaw

Warsaw subdialect
- gwara warszawska
- Pronunciation: [ˈɡvara varˈʂafska]
- Native to: Poland
- Region: Warsaw
- Native speakers: few
- Language family: Indo-European: Balto-Slavic; Slavic; West Slavic; Lechitic; Polish; Masovian; Warsaw subdialect

Language codes
- ISO 639-3: –
- Glottolog: None

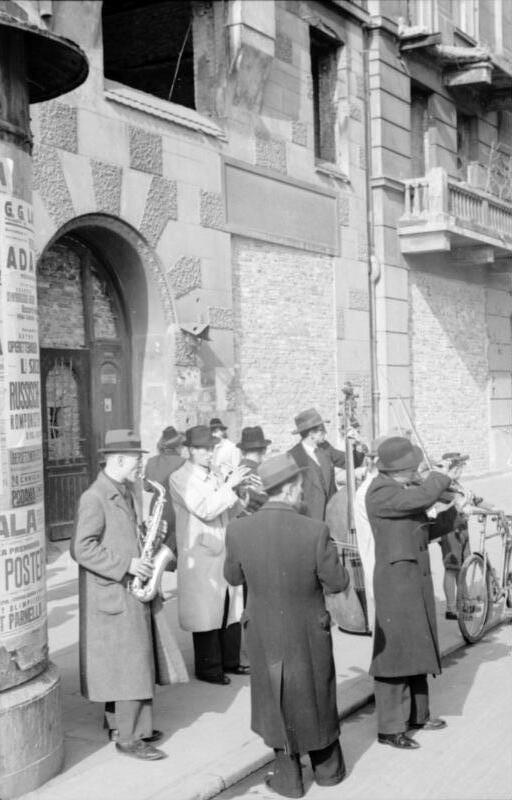
A street band playing Warsaw folk music during World War II

The Warsaw subdialect (Polish: gwara warszawska [ˈɡvara varˈʂafska]), or Warsaw dialect (Polish: dialekt warszawski), is a regional subdialect of the Masovian dialect of the Polish language, centered on the city of Warsaw. It evolved as late as the 18th century, under notable influence of several languages spoken in the city. After the destruction of Warsaw in the aftermath of the Warsaw Uprising of 1944, the subdialect has been in decline. It is estimated that in modern times it is almost extinct as the native language and is preserved mostly in literary works.

== Classification ==
The Warsaw dialect is composed mostly of the Polish language substratum, with notable (mostly lexical) influences from the Masovian dialect of Polish, as well as Russian, German, Yiddish, and other languages.

The dialect was composed of a variety of different class dialects: the language of the suburbs differed from the language of the city centre and each professional group used its own version of the dialect, slightly different from the others. It is therefore difficult to state the exact classification.

== Geographic distribution ==
The dialect was originally spoken in and around Warsaw, Poland. After 1944, it became dispersed as most of the inhabitants of Warsaw were either killed in the Warsaw Uprising or resettled in other parts of Poland. Currently, it is almost completely extinct as a primary language and is mostly used by authors and artists for stylisation in literature, poetry, and songwriting.

== History ==
The Warsaw dialect became a separate dialect of the Polish language some time in the 18th century, when the Polish substratum was enriched with many borrowed words from the Masovian dialect. The mixture was then heavily influenced by the languages spoken by the burghers of Warsaw and the royal court of Poland. These included the Italian, Yiddish, French, Latin and English. In the 19th century, during the Partitions of Poland, the dialect incorporated a great number of borrowed words from German and then Russian.

Until World War II, the language spoken by different classes and professions of Warsaw evolved independently, although were eventually mixed and interlinked. After the Warsaw Uprising, when the majority of its speakers were either killed or expelled and resettled in other parts of the world, the dialect became separated from its geographical roots and its users dispersed. After the war, only a small number of pre-war Varsavians returned there while the vast majority of the inhabitants of the city came from other parts of Poland. Because of that, the language spoken in Warsaw became heavily influenced by other dialects of the Polish language. The only boroughs of Warsaw where the dialect was preserved to some extent were Praga and Wola.

Since the 1960s, the uniformisation of the language spoken throughout Poland under the influence of the mass media (such as the television and radio) led to a rapid decline in speakers of all the dialects of Polish, the Warsaw dialect included.

Among the notable artists who used the Warsaw dialect in their books, songs, and poems are Hanka Bielicka, Wiktor Gomulicki, Stanisław Grzesiuk, Alina Janowska, Irena Kwiatkowska, Zygmunt Staszczyk, Stanisław Staszewski, Jarema Stępowski, Stefan Wiechecki, and Stasiek Wielanek. The most extensive studies of the Warsaw dialect were carried out by Bronisław Wieczorkiewicz in his book Gwara warszawska wczoraj i dziś (The Warsaw Dialect Yesterday and Today).

=== Sub-dialects ===
As mentioned above, the Warsaw dialect was further divided onto several sub-dialects. Those included:

- Sub-dialects of different boroughs – for instance the language of Praga, Wola, Powiśle
- Professional sub-dialects – for instance the language of cabmen, shopkeepers, printers or policemen
- Sub-dialects of criminals – a regional version of grypsera
- Jewish sub-dialect – a regional version of the Yiddish language, largely influenced by the Polish language

All of the above sub-dialects were constantly mixing with each other and the lexical basis of most of them was similar.

=== Derived dialects ===
Due to the large number of prisons in Warsaw, the influence of the Warsaw dialect on the evolution of grypsera was immense and to some extent the shape of the latter language is a distant relative of the former.

== Phonology ==
The basic phonology of the Warsaw dialect was that of the standard Polish language, with several notable differences.

The most important differences between literary Polish and the Warsaw dialect are the following:

Difference	Sound affected (IPA)	Polish example	Warsaw dialect	English translation	Remarks
Vowels
disappearance of the nasal vowels, especially in word-final syllables	[ɔ̃], [ɛ̃]
palatalisation of velar consonants before [ɛ] and [ɛ̃], especially in ending syllable	[k], [ɡ]	rękę ([ˈrɛŋkɛ̃] or [ˈrɛŋkɛ]	rękie ([ˈrɛŋkʲe])	hand or palm (Accusative)
replacement of the vowel cluster [ɔa] by [ua] or [uwa]	[ɔa],	zawoalowany ([ˌzavɔaloˈvanɨ])	zawualowany ([ˌzavualoˈvani])	veiled
replacement of the vowel [ɨ] with [i] or [ɪ]	[ɨ]	kochany ([kɔˈxanɨ])	kochany ([kɔˈxani] or [kɔˈxanɪ])	beloved

== Vocabulary ==
The Warsaw dialect has much of its lexicon borrowed from a variety of languages.

== Writing system ==
The Warsaw dialect did not develop a literary form. It has been used by several authors in Polish literature and written with a standard set of Polish letters with different sounds denoted by approximation.
