= Józef Landau =

Józef Landau (1875 – November 1933) was a poet, essayist, philosopher, educational activist, assimilationist, a leading representative of the movement of freethought.

Member and promoter of the progressives united in the Association of Commercial Employees of the Jews in Warsaw. Since 1921 board member of the main Polish Association of Free Thinkers and chief editor of "Free Thought" (1923–1924) and "Free Life". Delegate to the International Congress of Free Thought in Paris (1925) and Luxembourg (1929). The founder of the Warsaw Circle intellectuals since the 1930 editor and publisher of the press organ – Rationalist.

Author of sketches of anti-religious (Warsaw: Polish Association of Free Thinkers, 1923).
