= Reism =

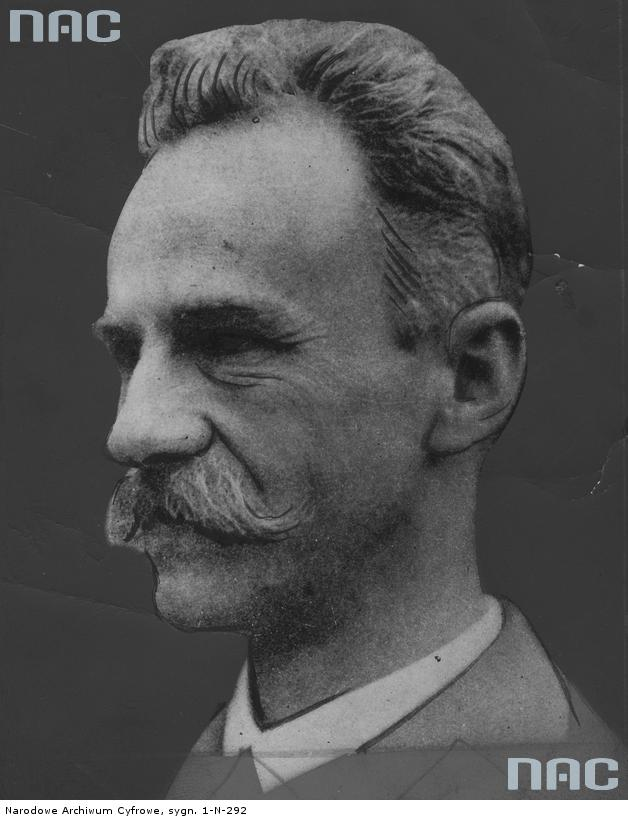
Tadeusz Kotarbiński considered reism as a project rather than a theory.

Reism, reificationism, concretism or concretionism is a view that only concrete material things exist. It is a philosophical theory associated with Tadeusz Kotarbiński who proposed that it involves both the proper view about the kinds of objects that exist and the literal way of speaking about things. It is based on the ontology of Stanisław Leśniewski, specifically, his "calculus of names". This theory, which is also referred to as somatism and pansomatism, has been interpreted as an analogue of defended classic physicalism.

== Background ==
Kotarbiński first introduced reism in his work called Elements of the Theory of Knowledge, Formal Logic and Methodology of the Sciences and the emergent theory was developed independent of the ideas previously put forward by the German philosopher Franz Brentano. The latter's account of reism is considered a metaphysical view of the mind. However, Kotarbiński's reism – as proposed – was not a ready theory of the world but a program with the aim of eliminating apparent terms (onomatoids) and partial successes.

Kotarbiński's model adopted the formal logic of Lesniewski and his rejection of the classical set-theoretic conception of classes in favor of the mereological whole. For the theorist, mereology is too weak to address the set-theoretical means needed in mathematics. Kotarbiński later cultivated his philosophical connection with Brentano and Kazimierz Twardowski since these authors focused on intentionality. Kotarbiński's reism is also considered an account of intentionality. He also referred to it as pansomatism since it claims that there are only bodies – that everything that exists is only a kind of body.

== Interpretations ==
Kazimierz Ajdukiewicz challenged Kotarbiński's conceptualization of reism, arguing that the statement that "every object is a thing" is a truism. For the latter, the reism principle is translated in the following: "For some a, a is an object and for all a, if a is an object then a is a thing." According to Ajdukiewicz, this statement is a truism because a can only be substituted by terms that have denotative capacity.

Kotarbiński's pansomatism is just one of the three approaches to reism. It can also take the dualism approach which recognizes that two different kinds of objects exist (e.g. souls and bodies) or the position of spiritual monism, which holds that only persons or mental objects exist.

== Ontological and semantical reism ==
Two versions of reism were introduced as Kotarbiński established that the theory is a comprehensive doctrine that contains both ontological and semantical theses. In the ontological sense, reism was condensed by Kotarbiński to the two postulates. The first is that "every object is a body" (i.e. all abstract concepts) are to be reduced to concrete objects. Secondly, no object is a state or relation, or property. It is said that Kotarbiński original conceptualization was ontological in the sense that there is only one category of objects.

In the semantical sense, it is a view on languages, particularly "the conditions of the meaningfulness of sentences". As a theory, it draws a distinction between "real" names, i.e., names associated with bodies and pseudo-names, onomatoids, which denote state of affairs, relations, properties, events, etc. It elaborates on when a sentence is meaningful, when it has a literal, direct sense or when it is meaningful or has an indirect sense. The semantic variation eventually became more accepted in the global reistic enterprise due to the argument that the reistic point of view contains typical onomatoids.
