= Union of Trade Unions =

Polish trade union confederation

ZZZ
- Union of Trade Unions
- Związek Związków Zawodowych
- Merged into: Union of Polish Syndicalists
- Founded: 25 May 1931
- Dissolved: 1 September 1939
- Members: 169,000 (1934)
- Publication: Front Robotniczy

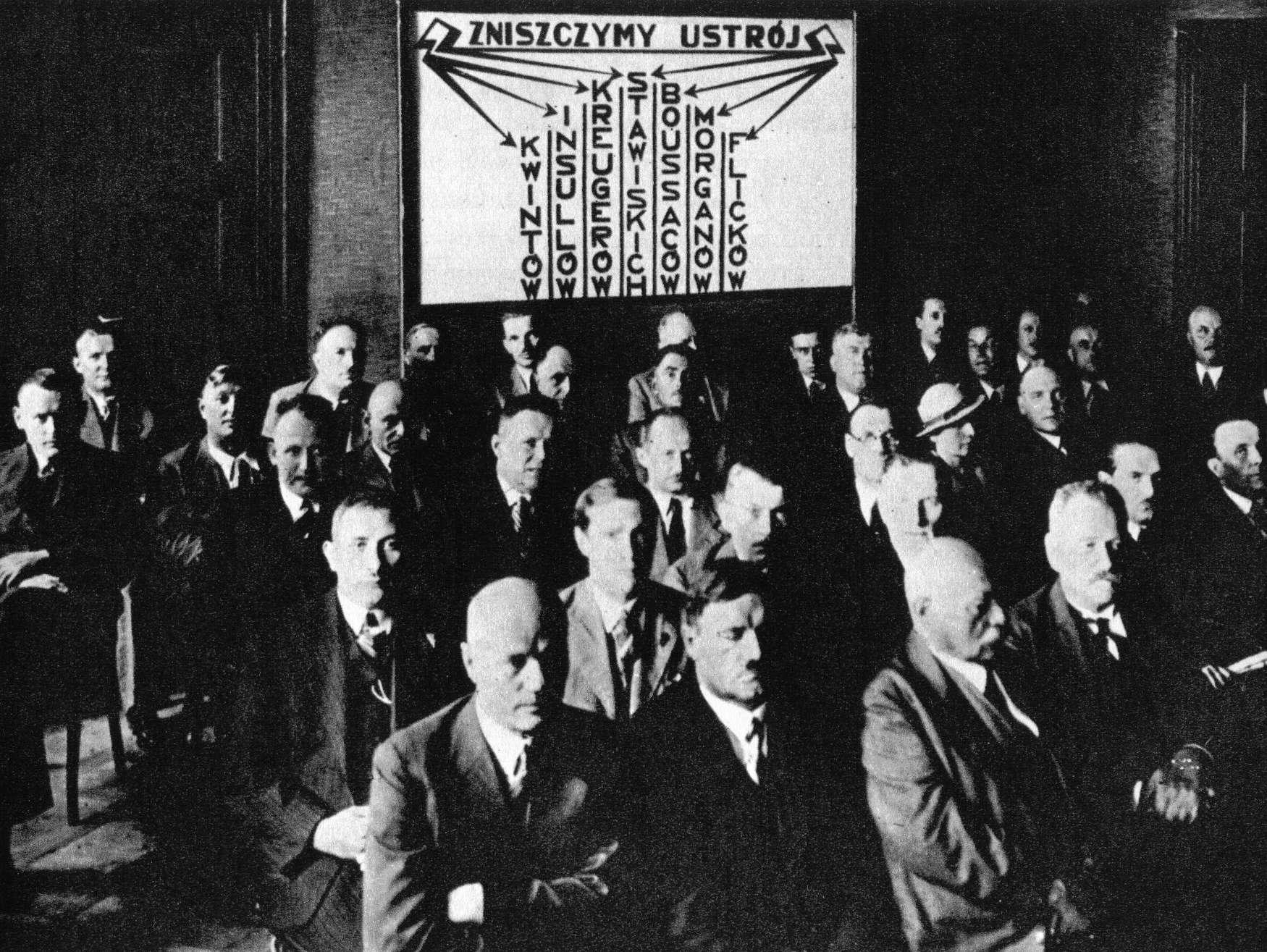
Meeting of the ZZZ management in 1935

The Union of Trade Unions (Polish: Związek Związków Zawodowych, ZZZ) was a trade union confederation formed as a result of an attempt to unite pro-social trade unions. It operated until 1939 and was one of the three largest union centers in Poland. It was pro-government at first, but under the influence of anarchists, it began to lean towards anarcho-syndicalism from 1936 onward. Soon it became the target of police and judicial repression, and their efforts were finally interrupted by the outbreak of World War II.

== History ==
The ZZZ was established on 25 May 1931, as a result of the consolidation of pro-social trade unions: the syndicalist General Labor Federation, the solidarist Confederation of Economic Trade Unions, part of the Sanation-Socialist Central Association of Class Trade Unions and the nationalist Polish Trade Unions "Praca" from Poznań and Pomerania. It was one of the three largest union headquarters in the country (169,000 members in 1934). ZZZ published the following magazines: Front Robotniczy, Front Pracownika Umysłowego, Front Górniczy Śląska i Zagłębia, Wiadomości Robotnicze, Głos Ludu and the daily Głos Powszechny. The Workers' Institute of Education and Culture named after S. Żeromski was active at the ZZZ.

Main activists of ZZZ: Jędrzej Moraczewski (president), Jerzy Szurig (secretary general), Stefan Kapuściński (activist from Upper Silesia), Kazimierz Zakrzewski (secretary of the Lviv District). Most of the ZZZ activists were associated with the left-wing Sanacja Repair Union. There were also anarchists active in ZZZ: Tomasz Pilarski (Sosnowiec, from 1939 in the Central Department of ZZZ), Władysław Głuchowski (Częstochowa) and Wiesław Protschke (Lviv). It is not entirely clear whether the anarchist activities within the ZZZ took place openly or conspiratorially in front of the leadership.

Initially, the ZZZ supported the ruling camp and, in return, benefited from the support of the state administration. It was reformist in nature and did not protest against Sanation authoritarianism or capitalism. The program adopted at the 1st Congress of the Union of Trade Unions (ZZZ) called for an increase in the role of the state in the economy and the unification of the working class in trade unions independent of the party. Class struggle was negated, social conflicts were to be settled by state arbitration.

During the Great Depression in ZZZ, a conflict grew between the solidarist group of Tomaszkiewicz and Malinowski and the syndicalists (Jędrzej Moraczewski, J. Szurig, B. Gawlik, G. Zieliński, S. Kapuściński, Stefan Szwedowski). During the Second Congress of the ZZZ in 1934, the program was radicalized under the influence of the syndicalists. Although they continued to emphasize the supra-class character of the state and postulated evolutionary changes, they also recognized the class struggle and proclaimed the slogan "take over the social ownership of the workshops". In 1935, the ZZZ concluded a "non-aggression pact" with the socialist union headquarters. From 1936, under the influence of the anarchists, there was an ever greater shift in course towards syndicalism. The "ideological declaration" adopted at the 3rd Congress of the ZZZ in 1937 proclaimed the class struggle, demanded the nationalization and communization of large plants, banks and foreign trade, postulated "people's democracy" (combining strong executive power with civil rights and participation of the popular masses in government). Congress also passed a resolution in solidarity with the Spanish anarcho-syndicalist CNT and refused to join the Camp of National Unity.

From then, the union was subjected to constant police and judicial repression (censorship interventions, arrests, trials for participation in demonstrations and anti-state public statements). In 1937, the police forcibly seized the premises of the ZZZ in Silesia to hand them over to a pro-government dissenting group. Solidarists from ZZZ led a split, as a result of which most of the members joined the pro-government Union of Polish Trade Unions (the number of ZZZ fell to 35,000 members).

On 13–14 March 1938, the Fourth Congress of the ZZZ took place, which adopted a new Ideological Declaration, an interpretation of Polish syndicalism. The union program now advocated a classless producer society, community management of workplaces, nonpartisan trade unions, and a general strike as a method of making the union's goals a reality. At the same time, it emphasized its patriotism, proclaiming its concern for the fate of the nation and the state, "building a new system on the Polish basis", and maintaining independence from international powers.

During World War II, members of ZZZ co-created, among others, the Union of Polish Syndicalists.
