= Aniela Wolberg =

Polish anarchist activist

- Born: Aniela Franciszka Wolberg; October 14, 1907; Częstochowa, Congress Poland
- Died: October 11, 1937 (aged 29); Warsaw, Republic of Poland
- Other names: Yalianna Woboerge
- Education: Chemistry
- Alma mater: Jagiellonian University; University of Montpellier
- Occupations: Editor-in-chief; Chemical engineer
- Organization: Anarchist Federation of Poland
- Movement: Anarchism

Aniela Wolberg (14 October 1907 – 11 October 1937) was a Polish anarchist activist.

== Biography ==
Wolberg was born into a wealthy Polish-Jewish family in the town of Częstochowa, Congress Poland. After completing her matura she moved to Kraków to study at the Jagiellonian University. It was here that she is believed to have first encountered anarchist ideas through the group of Bulgarian anarchists who were active at the university during this time. Wolberg was one of the founders of the underground newspaper Proletariat, which espoused anarchism at a time in which it was illegal to do so in Poland. In 1926 she became a member of the Anarchist Federation of Poland, before moving to Paris, France, in that year.

Whilst in France Wolberg became involved with Walka, a Polish journal of anarchism, and made links with French and Spanish anarchists. It was while in Paris that Wolberg would become acquainted with the Chinese anarchist writer Ba Jin, who would go on to pen two short stories about her, Yalianna (1931) and Yalianna Woboerge (1933).

After gaining an MSc in chemistry at the University of Montpellier, Wolberg found employment as a chemical engineer at an automotive factory in Paris. In 1927 she was a delegate, alongside Peter Arshinov, Nestor Makhno and Wu Kegang, at a committee convened by the Platformists to discuss the proposal to form an anarchist international. However, the meeting was broken up by the police with all the delegates in attendance being arrested. Wolberg was eventually deported from France back to Poland by the French police due to her political activities.

In 1932 Wolberg returned to Poland where she once again became active in the Anarchist Federation of Poland, becoming the editor in chief of their publication Walka Klas. In 1934 she was arrested by the Polish police but released without charge. Due to increasing state repression of the anarchist movement Wolberg directed her attention to science, becoming first assistant to the Professor of Bacteriology at the University of Warsaw. During this time she also worked as the private tutor of Bernard Konrad Świerczyński.

At the outbreak of the Spanish Civil War Wolberg may have travelled to Spain to organise with the Confederación Nacional del Trabajo, although historical accounts differ.

=== Death ===
On 11 October 1937 Wolberg died unexpectedly during a medical operation. An obituary written by Pierre Besnard expressed deep mourning at her loss on behalf of the IWA–AIT.
