= Association of Atheists and Freethinkers =

Association of Atheists and Freethinkers (Polish: Stowarzyszenie Ateistów i Wolnomyślicieli [SAIWA]) is a non-governmental organization founded in 1957 that aims to actively participate in the process of secularization of Polish society. The group is active in popularizing scientific knowledge about religion, creating a Polish secular culture and secular ethics as well as in promoting the rationalistic and materialistic view of the world, and working to limit the place of clericalism.

The organization continued in the tradition of pre-war Polish Association of Freethinkers, a group which was dominated by Communist Party activists, academics, and journalists.
