= Instigator Regni =

Position in Polish-Lithuanian Commonwealth

The Instigator Regni (in Latin) or Instygator Koronny (in Polish), the Lord Prosecutor of the Crown, was the highest central non-senatorial dignitary in Polish–Lithuanian Commonwealth, created in 1557.

In his name, the Instigators were to prosecute crimes against the State as well as offenses against the King, and they were permitted to pursue any noble dignitary other than the King. It was a court office, rank, and title that the King had awarded for life. They had advisory voice in assessory courts and decisive voice in referendary courts. After 1764, they controlled treasury committees.

There was one Instigator for the Crown and one for Grand Duchy of Lithuania until 1775, when four new Instigator offices were introduced by promoting to that honour their two assistants. The annual salary of Instigator Regni was 6,000 Polish złoty of those times.

Jan Władysław Kunat Wyrozębski and Malkher Kamenski were among those who served as Instigator Regni.
