= Anarchist Federation of Poland =

- Anarchistyczna Federacja Polski
- Successor: Syndicalist Organization "Freedom"
- Formation: July 24, 1926; 100 years ago
- Dissolved: September 1, 1939; 87 years ago
- Purpose: Anarcho-syndicalism
- Main organ: Głos Anarchisty

The Anarchist Federation of Poland (AFP) was an anarchist organization the operated underground in the Second Polish Republic.

== History ==
The AFP was created from a merger of a group of Zionist youth - the remnants of the United Jewish Socialist Workers Party and a group of Warsaw woodworkers, previously in SDKPiL, whose leader was Józef Golędzinowski, secretary of the Union of Wood Industry Workers. Among the founders there were also people who had previously worked independently or in trade unions. The organization participated in strikes and demonstrations. It brought together a dozen or so groups from large workers' centers, including Warsaw, Łódź, Kraków, Częstochowa, Tarnów.

The organization was established during the First National Conference, which was held on July 24–26, 1926. The meeting convened by the Organizational Committee of the Polish Academy of Sciences was attended by representatives of anarchist organizations from five Polish cities. Even before the organization was formally established, the Głos Anarchisty, later the official body of the AFP, had been published. The conference adopted three documents defining the future activities of the organization. The ideological guidelines briefly presented the basic assumptions of anarcho-syndicalism, with a negative attitude towards parliamentarism and the dictatorship of the proletariat, or the postulates of a social revolution leading to a society based on the idea of federalism. Tactics contains an analysis of Józef Piłsudski's May Coup, to which anarchists - unlike the Polish Socialist Party and the Communist Party of Poland (KPP) - reacted negatively from the beginning, criticism of the activities of political parties, trade unions and the cooperative movement, and finally a review of the methods of conducting direct action. In the Demonstration Applications, apart from paying tribute to the revolutionaries murdered and imprisoned by the authorities, AFP appealed to anarchists around the world to carry out actions for amnesty for political prisoners in Poland.

In 1928, there was a split in the KPP and the Union of Communist Youth, and some activists joined the AFP. According to police data from 1929, the Warsaw AFP then had at least 130 members, organized in 12 groups, which were in contact with each other through delegates, only through the secretariat of the organization.

In 1936, Polish anarchists gained an ideological influence on the Union of Trade Unions, which was important in the country. They began to give it an anarcho-syndicalist character, which, however, was interrupted by the outbreak of World War II.

Before 1939, a large group of anarchist youth left for Palestine under the guidance of Benjamin Wolman.

During the war, members of the AFP co-created the Syndicalist Organization "Freedom".

AFP activists were, among others Paweł Lew Marek, Stefania Karolina Marek, Zofia Hajkowicz-Brodzikowska, Jan Paweł Rogalski, Aniela Wolberg, Jerzy Woźnicki, Józef Dybowski, Salomon Filmus, Stefan Rosłoniec, Beniamin Wolman, Julian Komarnicki, Bohdan Ostromęcki, Jakub Galewicz, Jan Straszewski, Saul Hirsch Weindling, Mojżesz Finkelsztajn, Stanisław Banasiak, Bolesław Bolmowski.

=== Publications ===
The press body of the AFP was Głos Anarchisty, and then, from 1931, Walka Klas. There was also a journal devoted to theoretical issues, entitled Nasze Życie and for young people - and also edited by them - Młody Rewolucjonista. AFP also published brochures as part of the "Workers' Library", as well as occasional leaflets.

== Bibliography ==
- Zandberg, Adrian (2002). "Anarchistyczna Federacja Polski. Polscy anarchiści w dwudziestoleciu międzywojennym" (PDF). Przegląd Historyczny (in Polish). 1 (93). ISSN 0033-2186. Archived from the original (PDF) on 9 July 2020.
- Flisiak, Dominik (2017). "Działalność anarchistów z lat 1926–1932 w świetle zasobu Archiwum Państwowego w Kielcach" (PDF). Świętokrzyskie Studia Archiwalno-Historyczne (in Polish). Świętokrzyskie Studia Archiwalno‑Historyczne: 125–135. ISSN 2353-1223. Archived from the original (PDF) on 9 July 2020.
