= Tadeusz Kotarbiński =

Polish philosopher (1886–1981)

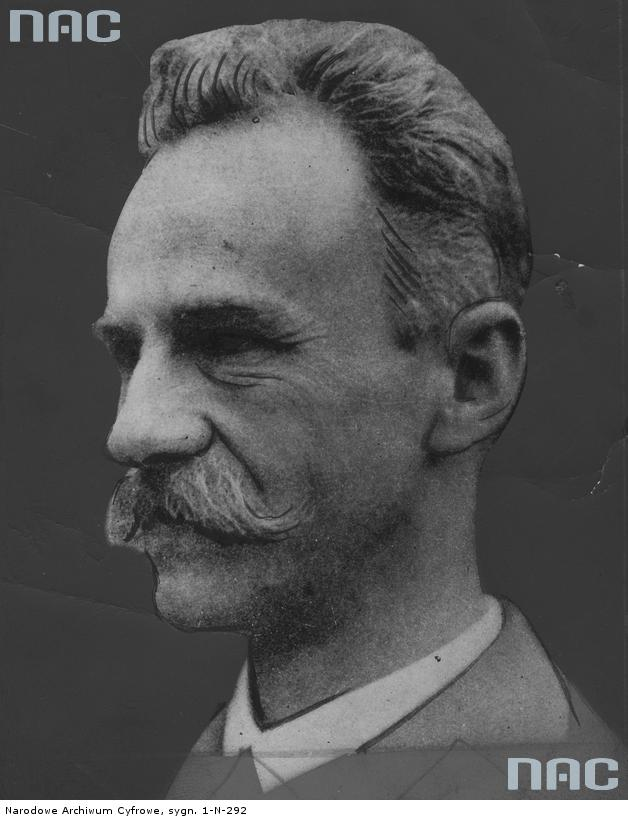
- Born: Tadeusz Marian Kotarbiński; 31 March 1886; Warsaw, Congress Poland, Russian Empire
- Died: 3 October 1981 (aged 95); Warsaw, People's Republic of Poland

Education
- Education: Jagiellonian University; University of Lviv (PhD, 1912)

Philosophical work
- Era: 20th-century philosophy
- Region: Western philosophy
- School: Lwów–Warsaw school of logic
- Institutions: Warsaw University
- Main interests: Ontology, formal logic, ethics, praxeology
- Notable ideas: Reism; Logology

Tadeusz Marian Kotarbiński (Polish: [kɔtarˈbij̃skʲi]; 31 March 1886 – 3 October 1981) was a Polish philosopher, logician, and ethicist.

A pupil of Kazimierz Twardowski, he was one of the most representative figures of the Lwów–Warsaw School, and a member of the Polish Academy of Learning (PAU) as well as the Polish Academy of Sciences (PAN). He developed a philosophical theory called reism (Polish: reizm) and an ethical system called "independent ethics". He also contributed to the development of praxeology.

== Life ==
Tadeusz Kotarbiński was born on 31 March 1886 in Warsaw, then Congress Poland, Russian Empire, into an artist's family. His father, Miłosz Kotarbiński, was a painter and his mother, Ewa Koskowska, was a pianist and composer. His uncles were Józef Kotarbiński, an important figure in Polish theater circles, and Wilhelm Kotarbiński, a talented painter. Expelled from secondary school in 1905 for participating in a strike, Kotarbiński managed to graduate two years later. He studied first as an unenrolled student at Jagiellonian University in Kraków, attending mostly lectures on mathematics and physics; then architecture in Lviv and Darmstadt, to finally settle for studies in philosophy and classical philology at the University of Lviv. His professors were some of the most esteemed philosophers, logicians and mathematicians of his time: Kazimierz Twardowski, Jan Łukasiewicz, Władysław Witwicki and philologist Stanisław Witkowski. He received his PhD with the thesis Utilitarianism in the Ethics of Mill and Spencer in 1912.

After graduation, he taught classical languages at Warsaw's Mikołaj Rey Gymnasium (secondary school). In 1918 he began a lecturing career in philosophy at Warsaw University; from 1929 to 1930 he was dean of humanities. In the interwar period, Kotarbiński was involved in social affairs. He actively fought against anti-semitism, ultranationalism and clericalism. He wrote mainly for the monthly "Racjonalista", an organ of the Polish Association of Freethinkers. During the persecution of students of Jewish origin at Polish universities, when right-wing organizations tried to designate separate sectors in lecture halls for non-Polish students, he jointly joined their protest, during which he conducted his lectures while standing. He was an opponent of the ghetto benches introduced at the University of Warsaw in 1937. In his activities, close to the left-wing and socialist groups, he was a member of the Polish Teachers' Union, being in the years 1937–1939 president of the Higher School Section.

After World War II, along with other men of learning, he helped create a state university in Łódź. In 1945 Kotarbiński became the first rector of the University of Łódź, holding this post until 1949 while simultaneously working at the University of Warsaw. His model of work became a benchmark for future generations of scholars at the University of Łódź.

Henryk Greniewski and Kazimierz Pasenkiewicz were doctoral students under Kotarbiński.

== Philosophy ==
=== Reism ===
Reism is a pansomatism (from Greek: πᾶν 'all' + σῶμα 'body') ontology as well as semantic theory developed by Kotarbiński and most extensively exposed in his major work: Elements of the Theory of Knowledge, Formal Logic and Methodology of the Sciences, first published in 1929. Kotarbiński was the creator of the term reism, a word derived from Latin res 'thing'.

=== Ontological reism ===
Kotarbiński's ontological reism approach assumes that the only things that exist, and thus the only ontological category to be used, are individual, concrete objects (or bodies) in opposition to doctrines allowing for the existence of such categories as universals, states of affairs, properties, relations, sets, classes, mental constructs, etc.

=== Semantic reism ===
In its semantic formulation, Kotarbiński postulated that meaningful sentences have to contain so-called genuine names (referring to concrete objects) as opposed to abstract objects' names or non-genuine names (onomatoids). He also distinguished onomatoids from empty names, which he considered to be 'reistic'. Sentences with onomatoids only were in his view meaningless, whereas those with empty names meaningful.

Reism has been anticipated by philosophers preceding Kotarbiński (Leibniz, Brentano and his pupils and earlier nominalists and materialists), but it was Kotarbiński who developed it to the complete, systematic exposition and gave it its name.

In 1958 in Philosophical Studies 4(7) Kotarbiński published Developmental Stages of Concretism, an essay in which he discussed the construction and evolution of his theory starting from the early concretism or nominalism, passing through seven stages of re-elaboration and finally culminating in pansomatism. Kotarbiński used terms: reism, pansomatism and concretism as equivalents to some extent throughout his works.

=== Praxeology ===
Kotarbiński was the most prominent representative and promoter of the science of efficient action, called praxeology. Scholars consider Kotarbiński's works in praxeology as the most systematic exposition of the foundations of this young science, particularly in his Traktat o dobrej robocie (A Treatise on Good Work) and, to some extent, his earlier publication called Szkice praktyczne (Essays on Practice).

Kotarbiński posited that praxeology is a science that is broader than the science of work as it contains philosophical elaboration of the concept of action, especially in the context of human work process, including the recommendations and general solutions for human activities in different fields. His position is considered partially descriptive in the sense that its aim is to understand relevant features of actions, but that the classifications it produces have normative objectives. Kotarbiński's contribution to the understanding of the nature of action is considered foundational for action theory (philosophy)

Three years after publishing A Treatise on Good Work, Kotarbiński persuaded the Polish Academy of Sciences to establish a Laboratory for General Questions of Work Organization (Pracownia Ogólnych Problemów Organizacji Pracy), later upgraded into a Department of Praxeology. Starting in 1962, it published a periodical, Materiały Prakseologiczne (Praxeological Papers), later renamed Prakseologia (Praxeology).

== Works ==
- Szkice praktyczne (Practical Sketches, 1913)
- Elementy teorii poznania, logiki formalnej i metodologii nauk. Lvov Ossolineum (1929); second revised edition 1961
- Traktat o dobrej robocie (1955); English translation: Praxiology. An Introduction to the Science of Efficient Action, New York: Pergamon Press, 1965.
- Sprawność i błąd (Efficiency and Error, 1956)
- Fazy rozwojowe konkretyzmu (= Studia Filozoficzne 4.7, 1958)
- Medytacje o życiu godziwym (Meditations about Decent Life, 1966)
- Leçons sur l'histoire de la logique. Paris: Presses Universitaires de France 1964. Original Polish edition 1957.
- Gnosiology. The Scientific Approach to the Theory of Knowledge. Oxford: Pergamon Press 1966 (English translation of Elementy by O. Wojtasiewicz).
- Écrits sur l'éthique (1935–1987), Hermann, Paris, 2017.

== See also ==
- History of philosophy in Poland
- List of Poles
- Wincenty Lutosławski
