= Stefan Wiechecki =

Polish writer and journalist

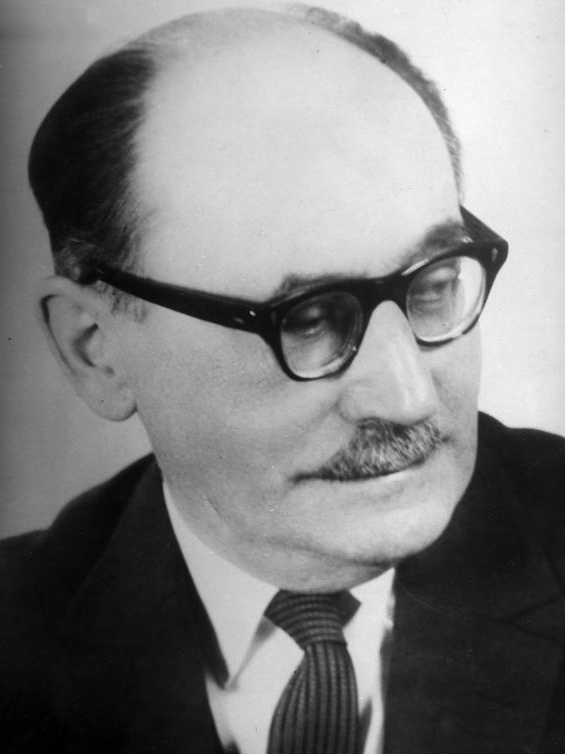
- Portrait of Wiechecki prior to 1950
- Born: 10 August 1896; Wielka Wola, Warsaw Governorate, Congress Poland
- Died: 26 July 1979 (aged 82); Warsaw, Warsaw Voivodeship, Polish People's Republic
- Resting place: Powązki Cemetery
- Writing career
- Pen name: Wiech

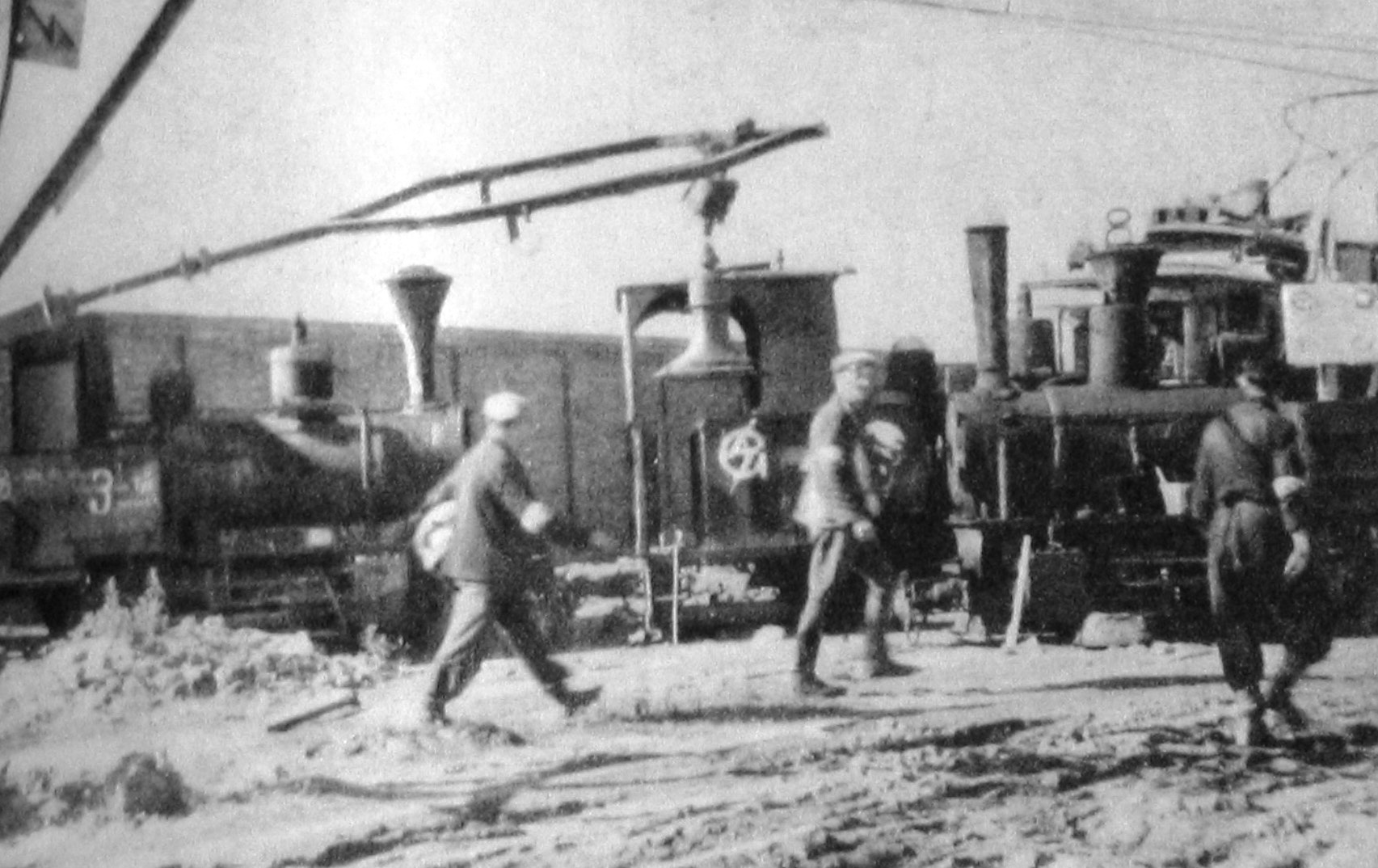
Barricade made of locomotives where Wiechecki edited some of the articles during the uprising; the signs and slogans painted on the engines were created by him

Stefan Wiechecki (pen-name Wiech; 10 August 1896 – 26 July 1979) was a Polish writer and journalist. He is most fondly remembered for his humorous feuilletons, which chronicled the everyday life of Warsaw and cultivated the Warsaw dialect.

== Biography ==
Stefan Wiechecki was born 10 August 1896. In interwar Poland he collaborated with numerous Warsaw-based newspapers, initially as a court reporter. During numerous trials he documented typical personalities of the poorer, less-known part of the city with its distinctive culture, language and customs. With time he was given his own column in the Express Wieczorny evening newspaper, where he published humorous sketches and feuilletons featuring personalities based on people taking part in trials he took part in. They gained much popularity, and in the late 1930s Wiechecki opened a chocolate shop in the borough of Praga, which became his main source of income.

During the Warsaw Uprising, he was cut off from his house on the other side of the river, in the Old Town. There he collaborated with numerous newspapers published in the Polish-held part of town, notably the Powstaniec. Sharing the fate of the rest of Warsaw's civilians, Wiechecki was forced out of the city after the end of the uprising. However, he returned soon after the town was retaken from the Germans and resumed his duties as a journalist. Some of his humorous stories were published in book form, while others continued to be published by Warsaw-based newspapers.

While criticised by linguists and Polonists for filling the Polish language with trash, he was nevertheless considered a classic of the Warsaw dialect, at that time suppressed by schools along with all other non-standard variations of the literary language. One of the scientists to defend him in numerous articles was Bronisław Wieczorkiewicz, who later published the first monograph on the dialects of Warsaw. A renowned Polish poet Julian Tuwim dubbed Wiechecki the Homer of Warsaw's streets and Warsaw's language, his feuilletons are also mentioned in the works of Antoni Słonimski, Stefan Kisielewski and Maria Pawlikowska-Jasnorzewska. He died 26 July 1979 in Warsaw, where he is buried. After 1989 one of the main pedestrian-only zones of downtown Warsaw was officially named the Wiech Passage in honour of Wiechecki.

Wiechecki's novel Cafe pod Minogą was filmed in 1956.
