= Paweł Marek =

Personal details
- Born: 16 August 1902 Radymno, Galicia
- Died: 7 November 1971 (aged 69) Warsaw, Poland
- Party: Polish United Workers' Party (1948-1971)
- Other political affiliations: Anarchist Federation of Poland (1926-1939)
- Spouse: Stefania Marek
- Occupation: Journalist

Military service
- Allegiance: Poland
- Branch/service: Polish People's Army
- Years of service: 1939-1945
- Unit: Syndicalist Brigade
- Battles/wars: World War II: Siege of Warsaw; Warsaw Ghetto Uprising; Warsaw Uprising; Vistula–Oder offensive

Paweł Lew Marek (16 August 1902, Radymno - 7 November 1971, Warsaw) was a Polish anarcho-syndicalist activist and journalist. He was co-founder of the Anarchist Federation of Poland during the Second Polish Republic, participant in the defence of Warsaw in 1939, then fought in the Warsaw Ghetto Uprising and in the subsequent Warsaw Uprising. After 1945, he worked as a trade union activist in the Polish People's Republic

== Biography ==
Born in Radymno on 16 August 1902, he first went to work at the age of fourteen. In 1919, he was a co-founder of the Independent Workers' Youth Organisation, a local socialist organisation in Radymno, in which Polish, Jewish and Ukrainian workers were active. During the Kraków uprising of November 1923, he took part in the protests in Przemyśl. Fearing arrest, he moved to Stanisławów, where he first became involved in the anarcho-syndicalist movement. Soon after he moved on to Warsaw, where he worked as an artisan. In 1926, he co-founded the Anarchist Federation of Poland. In the years 1930–1931, he stayed in France, where he worked part-time and at the same time was active in the milieu of Polish anarchists. After returning to Poland until 1937, he was elected the secretary of the Anarchist Federation of Poland and became the editor of its banned newspaper Class War.

During the invasion of Poland in September 1939, he took part in the defence of Warsaw. In the years 1941-1942 he lived in the Warsaw Ghetto. He then stayed in the concentration camp at Falenty, from which he escaped in February 1943, becoming a co-organiser of an underground syndicalist group. During the Warsaw Uprising, he participated in the press and propaganda group of the Syndicalist Brigade in Śródmieście, where he edited an insurgent magazine entitled Syndicalist and co-founded the Syndicalist Uprising Alliance.

After the city was liberated in 1945, he started working in the District Trade Union Commission. From this position, he began to promote worker cooperatives, organising the Union Housing Cooperative and acting as the chairman of its supervisory board. He was also a member of the supervisory board of the "Word" Publishing Cooperative in Łódź. Following the constitution of the Polish People's Republic, in November 1948, he joined the Polish Workers' Party and a month later he took part in the founding congress of the Polish United Workers' Party.
