= 104th Company of Syndicalists =

- 104 Kompania Syndykalistów
- Active: 1943–September 6, 1944
- Country: Poland
- Branch: (Polish Underground State) Home Army
- Size: Company
- Part of: Bończa Battalion
- Engagements: World War II: Warsaw Uprising

Commanders
- Notable commanders: Kazimierz Puczyński

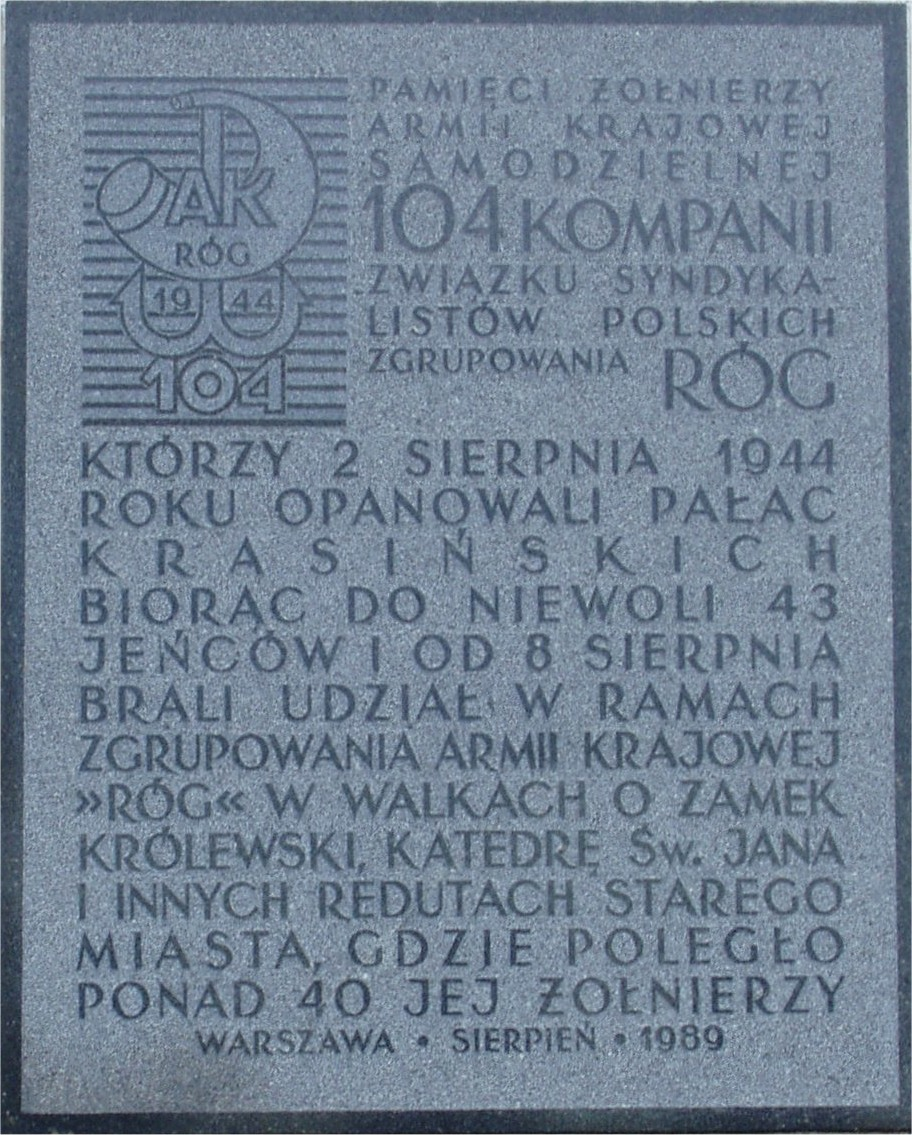
A memorial tablet in Warsaw, located near the Krasiński Palace, which was captured by soldiers of the 104 Company of Syndicalists on August 2, 1944.

104 Company of Syndicalists (Polish: 104 Kompania Syndykalistów) was a military unit created by the Union of Polish Syndicalists (Związek Syndykalistów Polskich), which participated in the Warsaw Uprising.

== Formation and structure ==
The 104th company was formed within the Home Army in 1943, on the basis of the combat unit of the Polish Syndicalists Union. Initially, the unit functioned as the 1028th platoon of the 1st District, the center of the Home Army. After being reformed into a company, it became part of the 1st Grouping of the 1st Region. Before the uprising, it was separated from the grouping and constituted the reserve of the commander of the 1st Region in the following composition:

- Commander - 2nd Lt. Kazimierz Puczyński "Wroński";
- Deputy - sec. director Witold Potz "Koperski";
- Chief of Staff - Stefan Zakrzewski "Zagórski";

It consisted of three assault platoons, a reserve platoon, and two labor platoons. The assault platoons were commanded by the following officers:

- 1st platoon - commandant Ignacy Choynowski (Rogoza), who died August 3, 1944. After that, he was replaced by Karol Choynowski (Karol), who was severely wounded on August 11, 1944, and was replaced by an unknown officer (nom de guerre Nord), who died around August 20. Finally, last commandant of the platoon was Stanislaw Narczyński (Mały),
- 2nd platoon - commandant Feliks Murawa (Smaga) (seriously sick after August 20, 1944), replaced by Mieczyslaw Teisseyre (Tesc), who was severely wounded on August 27, 1944. Platoon's last commandant was Stanisław Komornicki (Nałęcz),
- 3rd platoon - commandant Jozef Dolegowski (Leśniewski) (died August 28, 1944) and replaced by Wacław Borowski (Ryś).

On July 30, the company received 12 Sidolówek grenades from the District command. The company headquarters was located in the Szlenkier curtain factory at ul. Świętojerska 10. On the first day of the Uprising, before 17.00 on August 1, sixty soldiers arrived - including fifteen women - arrived at the HQ. The armament was: 5 pistols, 200 rounds of ammunition, two revolvers and 12 grenades.

== Participation in the Warsaw Uprising ==
=== First days ===
At first, the company had around 50 soldiers, but it quickly grew in size, with numerous volunteers joining. On the first day of the Uprising, it took part in two failed attacks on a school located at Barokowa street, in which a German hospital was located. Also, it attacked the Polish Securities Printing House building, capturing it on the night of August 1/2.

On the third day of the Uprising, it had some 360 soldiers, who, however, lacked weapons. The situation improved when the Poles captured Krasiński Palace and seized German guns and grenades as well as 42 German POWs.

The company was not only engaged in fighting. It had its own field bakery, which made bread, distributed to civilian population, as well as a field hospital, led by doctor Adam Krakowski. Furthermore, it had its own press service, consisting of members of the Union of Polish Syndicalists. It published two magazines - Iskra and Syndykalista.

After heavy fights in the first weeks of August 1944, the Company became the best-equipped Polish unit in the area of the Old Town. It participated in capture of the PASTA skyscraper and in skirmishes around Warsaw's Royal Castle. Then, under pressure from the Germans, it organized defence of the Old Town, including St. John's Cathedral.

In the second half of August, the Company created its headquarters in the so-called Professors’ House, at 12 Brzozowa Street, where it stayed until general retreat from the district. During several skirmishes back then, the Company used red-black flags of Anarcho-syndicalists, which was at odds with the Home Army's Military police, which demanded replacement of the flag with the Polish one and change the name of the Company into 104 Company of the Home Army. It has been estimated that losses (KIA, MIA and WIA) of the unit reached more than 50% of its personnel.

=== Final days ===
In late August 1944 the company, numbering only around 100 soldiers, evacuated through the sewage canals to the Warszawa-Śródmieście (Warsaw city center). There, it became part of the Boncza Battalion, and took part in fighting in the district of Powiśle, during which the company was further depleted. The Assault Platoon, with 26 men managed to get to Czerniaków, where it became engaged in heavy fighting. In early September, parts of the company carried out rearguard actions during the evacuation of Warsaw's Old Town.

On September 15, 1944, three soldiers of the company managed to get across to the eastern bank of the Vistula. Later on more men got across, where they were conscripted into the First Polish Army.
