= Union of Polish Syndicalists =

Polish conspiratorial organization (1941–45)

ZSP logo used in some issues of the Czyn magazine

Union of Polish Syndicalists (Polish: Związek Syndykalistów Polskich, ZSP) was a Polish civilian-military conspiratorial organization, active between April 1941 and mid-1945 in Nazi occupied Poland. It was based on the left wing of the syndicalist association Freedom and People, founded in Warsaw on October 21, 1939.

Association Freedom and People (Wolność i Lud, WiL) had two wings - military and civilian. Its objectives were presented in official declaration Kupujmy broń (Let us buy weapons). In December 1939 the first armed units (called Polish Syndicalist Units Freedom and People) were created. They consisted of small 3-5-persons groups, which cooperated with the Związek Walki Zbrojnej (Association of Armed Struggle, ZWZ).

In April 1941 Freedom and People was renamed to The Union of Polish Syndicalists, and in the summer of next year a group of officers decided to leave the Union and enter the general anti-Nazi organization, the Home Army (Armia Krajowa, AK). As a result, the military wing of WiL had to be re-created almost from scratch. In October 1942 first Assault Unit Zew was organized, and it was subject to headquarters of the Home Army.

Union of Polish Syndicalists also issued several conspiratorial magazines (such as Akcja, Sprawa, Czyn, Sprawa Chłopska, Myśl Młodych, Dekada, Iskra). In the fall of 1942 it co-created the Front of the Patriotic Left. In its program, created in 1943, it supported among others issues, moving the borders of Poland westward to the Oder-Neisse line, while at the same time preserving pre-1939 eastern borders of the country. It also supported close cooperation with other Slavic nations.

During the Warsaw Uprising, the Union created the 104th Company of Syndicalists under Kazimierz Puczyński, which fought in Warsaw's Old Town. After World War II, it supported the Soviet-backed State National Council (KRN) and Polish Committee of National Liberation (KPWN) and dissolved itself some time in mid-1945.

== See also ==
- Polish contribution to World War II
