= Polish Association of Freethinkers =

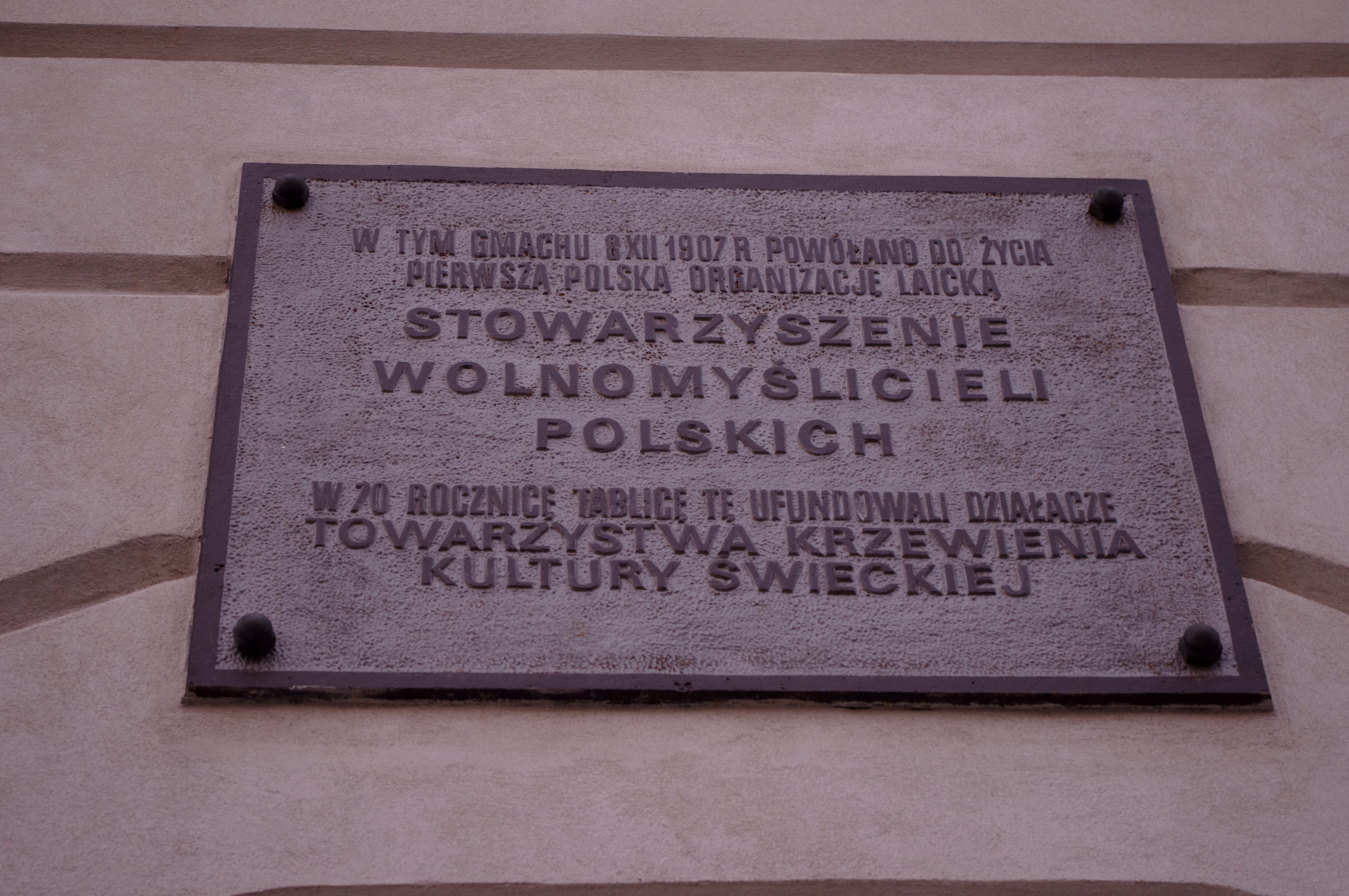
A plaque commemorating the PAF on the building of the Central Agricultural Library on Krakowskie Przedmieście in Warsaw

Polish Association of Freethinkers (PAF) (Polish: Stowarzyszenie Wolnomyślicieli Polskich; SWP) was a secular movement established in 1907 in Warsaw. Polish Association of Freethinkers was the first such organization in the Polish lands.

== History ==
On December 8, 1907, Delegates and the National Congress of Polish Freethinking in Warsaw, established the Polish Association of Freethinkers. Among the participants-founders were social activists Aleksander Świętochowski and Ludwik Krzywicki. The Association set itself the goal of fighting for the introduction of: secular standards of public life, secular metrics, secular wedding and funeral, and abolition of coercive religious education in schools. Tsarist repression led to the rapid outlawing PAFT already in 1909.

In May 1920. By Jan Niecisław Baudouin de Courtenay reactivated activity PAFT. De Courtenay became the first president. Among the founders were: Romuald Minkiewicz, Jan Hempel and Józef Landau. The movement demanded above all a real separation of church and state, legal recognition lack of religious beliefs.

At the third congress of the PAFT in 1925. It made a split in the organization's supporters and liberal enlightenment tradition led by Jan Baudouin de Courtenay and Joseph Landau, and supporters of Marxism. A group of left-wing activists close to the Communist Party with Jan Hempel seized the leadership of the organization, for which the earlier demands of the movement were too liberal.

The Association began to emphasize threads anticlerical and atheistic, acceded to the International of the Proletarian Freethinkers. A group of activists associated with the old leadership had left the organization and set up in 1926 Polish Association of Free Thought.

In 1928. The administrative authorities resolved the Polish Association of. Most of Freethinkers the activists of the banned PAFT joined the Polish Association of Free Thought, which eventually began to refer to leftist slogans, which led to its outlawing in 1936.

== Bibliography ==
- Od racjonalizmu do kryzysu. Towarzystwo Kultury Świeckiej. Urząd Miasta Łodzi
