= Wróblewski =

Wróblewski (feminine Wróblewska) is a Polish toponymic surname, which originally meant a person from one of several places called Wróblew or Wróblewo in Poland, with these villages in turn named for the Polish word wróbel ("sparrow"). Alternative spellings abroad include Wroblewski and Wroblewsky. Russian-language transliteration: Vrublevsky, Latvian: Vrubļevskis, Lithuanian: Vrublevskis.

== People with the surname ==
- Andrzej Wróblewski (1927–1957), Polish painter
- Andrzej Krzysztof Wróblewski (1935–2012), Polish journalist
- Anna Wroblewski (born 1985), American poker player
- Augustyn Wróblewski (1866–1913), Polish anarchist
- Bogusław Wróblewski (born 1955), Polish literary critic
- Bartłomiej Wróblewski (born 1975), Polish politician
- David Wroblewski (born 1959), American novelist
- Franciszek Wróblewski (1789–1857), Polish doctor
- Hanna Wróblewska (born 1968), Polish art historian and politician
- Jan Ptaszyn Wróblewski (1936–2024), Polish musician
- Jan Wróblewski (glider pilot) (born 1940), Polish glider pilot
- Jerzy Wróblewski (1926–1990), Polish legal scholar
- Joanna Wróblewska (born 1995), Polish professional footballer
- Krystyna Wróblewska (1904–1994), Polish painter, graphic artist, book designer and member of the Polish Academy of Sciences
- Patrick Wroblewski, American politician
- Paul Wroblewski, British television director
- Stanisław Wróblewski (1959–2019), Polish wrestler
- Tadeusz Wróblewski (1858–1925), Polish politician
- Tomasz Wróblewski (born 1980), Polish musician
- Walery Antoni Wróblewski (1836–1908), Polish politician
- Władysław Wróblewski (1875–1951), Polish politician
- Zygmunt Florenty Wróblewski (1845–1888), Polish scientist

== See also ==
- House of Wróblewski
- Wróblewski (crater)
