= Wróblewski family =

Wróblewski
- Ślepowron coat of arms
- Current region: Poland
- Members: Walery Antoni Wróblewski; Franciszek Wróblewski; Tadeusz Wróblewski; Augustyn Wróblewski; Andrzej Wróblewski; Ludwik Wróblewski; Jerzy Wróblewski; Piotr Wróblewski
- Connected families: Plater, Ogiński

Wróblewski is one of the notable Polish noble families in the Kingdom of Poland.

== History ==
The first known Wróblewski of Ślepowron coat of arms was Łukasz Wróblewski (born around 1620). He settled down in a village of Kołomyja in Pokucie together with his wife, Katarzyna (née Owadowska), during war with Cossacks. There is not much info available about him, except that he had at least one son. His name was Piotr, and he also had at least one son, who was named Sebastian.

Sebastian Wróblewski was the heir of the Wróblewski family. He married Katarzyna (née Rajtarowska) with whom he had three sons. They would later become founders of the three lines of the House of Wróblewski:

- Bazyli Wróblewski
- Józef Wróblewski
- Jan Wróblewski

== Main lines ==
=== Vilnius line ===
The Vilnius line was founded by Bazyli Łukasz Wróblewski, oldest of three sons of Sebastian Wróblewski. Initially, Bazyli and his brothers lived in the area of Kołomyja in Pokucie, but with time Bazyli and his family decided to move to Vilnius. Some of the descendants of this line live until now in central and southern Poland, mainly in the vicinity of Kraków and Łódź.

Notable members of this line are

- Susan Hailey, born Susan Wroblewski, an author whose paternal grandparents immigrated to Chicago in the 1940s
- Walery Antoni Wróblewski, one of the leaders of the January Uprising and the Paris Commune,
- Tadeusz Wróblewski, lawyer and founder of the Wróblewski Library in Vilnius,
- Franciszek Wróblewski, Doctor of Medicine and Surgery
- Ludwik Wróblewski, Doctor of Medicine and Surgery
- Augustyn Wróblewski, biochemist,

=== Pokucie line ===
The line of Pokucie was founded by Józef Wróblewski, who was the brother of Bazyli, protoplast of the Vilnius line. Józef lived in the area of Kołomyja in Pokucie. The descendants of Józef Wróblewski were Walerian Wroblewski, a professor of high school, and his daughter, Wanda Wróblewska-Składzień, a lawyer, commander of WSK AK Tarnow, Lieutenant of AK.

=== Military line ===
The Military line was founded by descendants of Jan Wróblewski, brother of Józef and Bazyli. Notable members of this line are two brothers - Stanisław Wróblewski, General of the Second Republic of Poland, and Jan Karol Wróblewski, also general of the Second Republic of Poland. Stanisław was born in 1868 in Skwyra and Jan Karol was born in 1871 in Radowce.
