= Ludwik Franciszek Wróblewski =

Polish nobleman (1814–1870)

- Born: 4 February 1814; Vilnius, Russian Empire
- Died: 10 September 1870 (aged 56); Vilnius, Russian Empire
- Resting place: Rasos Cemetery
- Occupation: Physician
- Children: Józef Wróblewski
- Parents: Franciszek Wróblewski (father); Zofia Wróblewska (née Szytler) (mother)

Ludwik Wróblewski (4 February 1814 – 10 September 1870) was a Polish noble and a Doctor of Medicine.

== Biography ==
Ludwik Wróblewski was born to a wealthy family of Ślepowron coat of arms. He was the youngest son of Franciszek Wróblewski and Zofia Wróblewska (née Szytler). He earned M.D. degree in Medicine. For his merit he was awarded Order of Saint Anna by Emperor Nicholas I of Russia.

He had at least one child - son Józef, who was the father of Bronisław Wróblewski and grandfather of Polish painter Andrzej Wróblewski.

Ludwik Wróblewski was buried at Rasos Cemetery.

== See also ==
- Wróblewski (Ślepowron)
