= Hot Decree to the Russian Regiments =

18th-century Belarusian satirical poem

Ukaz Goraczy Połkom Rossyiskim
- by Anonymous
- Original title: Указ гарачы палком Расійскім… Ukaz Goraczy Połkom Rossyiskim
- Country: Polish–Lithuanian Commonwealth
- Language: Old Belarusian (in Latin script)
- Subject(s): Anti-Russian satire, Seven Years' War
- Genre(s): Satire, Political satire

Ukaz Goraczy Połkom Rossyiskim... (Belarusian: Указ гарачы палком Расійскім…; English: "Hot Decree to the Russian Regiments...") is a Belarusian satirical poem of an anti-Russian nature, written in the 1760s. It is found in the same manuscript as another poem by the same author, "Project for the Great-Terrible Russian Army..." (Праект вяліка-страшнаму войску Расійскаму…).

== Authorship and language ==
The author was a nobleman (szlachcic), most likely from the Vitebsk region. His language shows features of Northern Belarusian dialects, such as the lexemes pajać (to take) and blech (a flat place/bleaching ground). However, the language of the poem is generally considered supra-dialectal.

The parody element lies in the stylization of the speech of Muscovites and the use of obscene vocabulary.

== History ==
These patriotic works were spawned by the events of the very end of the Seven Years' War (1756–1763). They serve as a parody of Russian military songs.

The manuscript is preserved in Vilnius, in the Wroblewski Library of the Lithuanian Academy of Sciences. It also contains works in the Polish language. The poems were discovered in the 1970s by the Belarusian scholar Adam Maldzis, who reported on them but was unable to publish the two Belarusian satires due to Soviet censorship. They were published in full for the first time in 2016.

== Text ==
The poem satirizes the return of the Russian army from Prussia to Moscow and references the coup d'état against Tsar Peter III in favor of Catherine II.

Original Latin script

Ukaz Goraczy Połkom Rossyiskim z Prus do Moskwy woroczajuczymsia czerez Kuryera Wsiey armii objawlaiem

Stupay armia z Prus u swoju storonu
Znaydieszli połne w Moskwie usiakoho humoru,
Tepier warchoł wieliki w Pieterburgu stał się
Pieter Car Fiedorowicz na tronu usrał się
Dumna Boiaryna Skoro to zwiedyła
Wtotczas Chwiedorowicza procz z tronu zbrosyła.
Połnosz Sudar gownie bolsze carstwowaty
Nie budiesz Ruskoy wiery w Lutry woroczaty,
Żonu Katrynu na gosudarstwo pryniały
Chwiedorowicza u syłku w Połony posłały,
Zdiorli z Chwiedorowicza Sztofan odnym duchom
Pod czetwiertym uze Moskwa zostajet fartuchem

Modern Belarusian spelling

Указ Гарачы Палком Расійскім з Прус да Масквы варочаючымся чэраз Кур'ера ўсёй арміі аб'яўляем

Ступай, армія, з Прус у сваю старану,
Знойдзеш-лі поўне ў Маскве ўсякага гумару.
Цяпер вярхол вялікі ў Пецярбургу стаўся,
Пецяр Цар Фёдаравіч на трону усраўся.
Думна Баярыня скора то зведала,
Ўтотчас Хведаравіча проч з трону збросіла.
Поўнаш, Судар, ў гаўне большэ царстваваці,
Не будзеш Рускай веры ў Лютры варочаці.
Жону Катрыну на гасударства прынялі,
Хведаравіча ў сылку ў Палоны паслалі.
Здзёрлі з Хведаравіча штофан адным духам,
Пад чацвёртым ужо Масква застает фартухам.

Rough English translation

Hot Decree to the Russian Regiments returning from Prussia to Moscow, announced via Courier to the whole army

March, army, from Prussia to your own side,
You will find in Moscow plenty of all kinds of humor.
Now a great turmoil has happened in Petersburg,
Peter Tsar Fedorovich has shat himself on the throne.
The Council of Boyars found out about this soon,
And immediately threw Fedorovich off the throne.
Enough, Sir, of reigning in shit anymore,
You will not turn the Russian faith into Lutheranism.
They accepted wife Catherine to rule the state,
And sent Fedorovich to exile in Polony.
They tore the brocade off Fedorovich in one breath,
Moscow remains under the fourth apron [woman's rule] already.

== Bibliography ==
- Мартысюк, В. (2016). Дзве вершаваныя сатыры з ХVІІІ стагоддзя [Two Verse Satires from the 18th Century]. Acta Albaruthenica (in Belarusian). 16: 307–309.
