= Zabiely Collection =

18th-century manuscript collections from Belarus

- Wroblewski Library of the Lithuanian Academy of Sciences
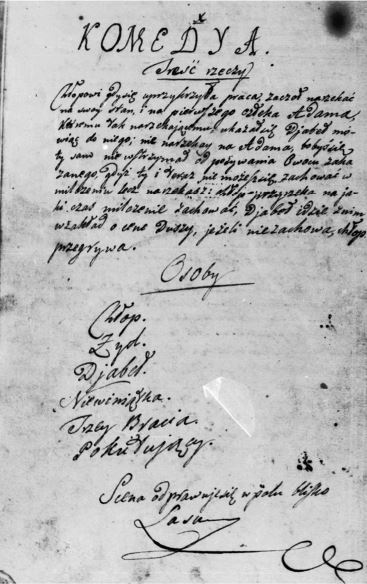
- Title page of Comedy by Kajetan Maraszewski
- Also known as: Забельскія зборнікі
- Type: Drama, Poetry
- Date: 1787–1791
- Language(s): Belarusian, Polish, Latin
- Author: Faculty of the Zabiely Dominican College

The Zabiely Collection (Belarusian: Забельскія зборнікі) are a group of manuscripts that were written between 1787 and 1791 in the Belarusian, Polish, and Latin languages. They were created by the teachers of the Zabiely Dominican College to be performed in their school theatre. The college operated from 1716 to 1811 on the Zabiely estate, which was near the village of Валынцы (Верхнядзвінскі раён) (now in the Верхнядзвінскі раён in Belarus). The collections are preserved in the Wroblewski Library of the Lithuanian Academy of Sciences in Vilnius.

== Selected works ==
The collection includes a variety of dramatic and poetic works including:

- Works by Kajetan Maraszewski: the Polish tragedy Freedom in Bondage (Wolność w niewoli) and the comic Belarusian-Polish Comedy (Камедыя).
- Works by Michał Ciecierski: the Polish tragedies Saphar and Themistocles, and the comedies Doctor by Force (Doktor z musu), Comedy, and Marriage Turned Upside Down (Małżeństwo do góry nogami).
- Works by Ignacy Jurewicz: the tragedy Croesus and the comedy of manners Pysznogolski.
- Elegies, orations, and odes by M. Kossow and H. Pawłowicz.
- The comic opera Apollo the Legislator, or Reformed Parnassus (Apollo prawodawca, czyli Parnas reformowany), with text by Michał Ciecierski and music by Rafał Wardocki.

Most of the works are Enlightenment in their ideological design and Classicist in style.

== Bibliography ==
- Мальдзіс, А. І. (1980). На скрыжаванні славянскіх традыцый [At the Crossroads of Slavic Traditions] (in Belarusian). Мінск: Навука і тэхніка.
- Каяла, У. І. (2012). "Забельскія зборнікі". In Бялова, Т. У. (ed.). Культура Беларусі: энцыклапедыя [Culture of Belarus: Encyclopedia] (in Belarusian). Vol. 3. Мінск: Беларуская Энцыклапедыя імя П. Броўкі. ISBN 978-985-11-0662-8.
