= The Queuing Continues =

1956 painting by Andrzej Wróblewski

- Kolejka trwa (Polish)
- Artist: Andrzej Wroblewski
- Year: 1956
- Medium: oil on canvas
- Dimensions: 140 cm × 200 cm (55 in × 79 in)
- Location: National Museum; Warsaw

The Queuing continues is an oil painting by Andrzej Wroblewski from 1956.

== Description ==
The oil on canvas measures 140 x 200 centimeters (decorated in rich colors and using midtones and subdued colors) It is in the collection of the National Museum in Warsaw.

== Analysis ==
The painting shows people sitting one behind another, in a queue, in a room resembling a waiting room. On the wall of the room there appears an arrow pointing to the right and a plate. Among the depicted persons is a young woman with a baby on her lap, and an older man and older woman. In the frame are also fragments of other characters. Within the image beats apathy, indifference, toil of daily existence, waiting for death, and apathy.
