= Project for the Great-Terrible Russian Army =

18th-century Belarusian satirical poem

Projekt Wieliko sztasznomu woysku Rossyiskomu...
- by Anonymous
- Original title: Праект вяліка-страшнаму войску Расійскаму… Projekt Wieliko sztasznomu woysku Rossyiskomu...
- Country: Polish–Lithuanian Commonwealth
- Language: Old Belarusian (in Latin script)
- Subject(s): Anti-Russian satire, Seven Years' War
- Genre(s): Satire, Political satire

Projekt Wieliko sztasznomu woysku Rossyiskomu... (Belarusian: Праект вяліка-страшнаму войску Расійскаму…; English: "Project for the Great-Terrible Russian Army...") is a Belarusian satirical poem of an anti-Russian nature, written in the 1760s. It is found in the same manuscript as another poem by the same author, "Hot Decree to the Russian Regiments..." (Указ гарачы палком Расійскім…).

== Authorship and language ==
The author was a nobleman (szlachcic), most likely from the Vitebsk region. His language shows features of Northern Belarusian dialects, such as the lexemes pajać (to take) and blech (a flat place/bleaching ground). However, the language of the poem is generally considered supra-dialectal.

The parody element lies in the stylization of the speech of Muscovites and the use of obscene vocabulary.

== History ==
These patriotic works were spawned by the events of the very end of the Seven Years' War (1756–1763). They serve as a parody of Russian military songs.

The manuscript is preserved in Vilnius, in the Wroblewski Library of the Lithuanian Academy of Sciences. It also contains works in the Polish language. The poems were discovered in the 1970s by the Belarusian scholar Adam Maldzis, who reported on them but was unable to publish the two Belarusian satires due to Soviet censorship. They were published in full for the first time in 2016.

== Text ==
The poem mocks the ineffectiveness of the Russian army against the Kingdom of Prussia during the Seven Years' War.

Original Latin script

Projekt Wieliko sztasznomu woysku Rossyiskomu naprotiw niezdobnomu Korolu Pruskomu prez siem let na woynie buduszczemu pramo czesno napisano

Lista

Durnaja Moskwa naprymier kak sraka
Niezwojowała prez siem lat Prusaka.
Sowsiem pohybły sołdaty, kozaki
Gusary kałmyki pramo kak sobaki
Wsie pohinuły kto kohda posłyszy
Rozohnał Prusak kak rudyie myszy
Z Huśmy wam wojowaty nietli z sobakami
Nie s choroszymy ludzmi Prusakami
Tiepier wsie narody wam naruhajut,
Cełuju Moskwu za durnuju majut,
Mać by waszu wjob kak wy wojowaly
Diengi pojeły Ludiey poterały
Sohnały sem lit kak gowna na blechu
Z waszey woyny połny karman smiechu
Wiecznaja sława korolu Pruskomu
Lichu pohibel miru Rossyiskomu
Zjawiłyb Hospody kolib Pruska Stada
Durnuju Moskwu czort zahnał de Hada
Zniszczyły miesta, Jmbary, komory
Bladczyie Syny wsie Roskoły, Wory
No kawalery, Połkou Hienierały
Niezbiwszy Prusa procz poutekały
Stupay jebiona mat’ do swojeyże chaty
Połnosta z Prusom bolsze wojowaty.

Modern Belarusian spelling

Праект вяліка-страшнаму войску Расійскаму напроціў няздобнаму Каралю Прускаму праз сем лет на вайне будучаму прама чэсна напісана

Ліста

Дурная Масква напрымер как срака
Не зваявала праз сем лет Прусака.
Саўсем пагіблі салдаты, казакі
Гусары калмыкі прама как сабакі
Усе пагінулі хто когда паслышы
Разагнаў Прусак как рудыя мышы
З Гусьмі вам ваяваці нет-лі з сабакамі
Не з харошымі людзьмі Прусакамі
Цяпер усе народы вам наругаюць,
Цэлую Маскву за дурную маюць,
Маць бы вашу ўёб как вы ваявалі
Дзеньгі паелі Людзей пацяралі
Сагналі сем лет как гаўна на блеху
З вашай вайны поўны карман смеху
Вечная слава каралю Прускаму
Ліху пагібель міру Расійскаму
З'явіў бы Госпадзі колі б Пруска Стада
Дурную Маскву чорт загнаў да Гада
Знішчылі места, імбары, каморы
Блядчыя Сыны ўсе Расколы, Воры
Но кавалеры, Палкоў Генералы
Не збіўшы Пруса проч паўцякалі
Ступай ябёна маць да сваёй жа хаты
Поўнаста з Прусам большэ ваяваці.

Rough English translation

Project for the Great-Terrible Russian Army against the incapable Prussian King, who has been at war for seven years, written straight and honestly

Letter

Stupid Moscow is like an arse, for example
Could not conquer the Prussian in seven years.
Soldiers, cossacks completely perished
Hussars, Kalmyks just like dogs
Everyone perished whenever one hears
The Prussian scattered [them] like red mice
You should fight with geese or with dogs
Not with good people Prussians
Now all nations mock you,
They consider the whole Moscow stupid,
F*** your mother, how you fought
You ate up the money, lost the people
You wasted seven years like shit on a bleaching ground
[There is] a full pocket of laughter from your war
Eternal glory to the Prussian King
Evil destruction to the Russian world
If the Lord showed the Prussian Herd
The devil would drive stupid Moscow to Hell/Snake
They destroyed towns, barns, pantries
Sons of bitches, all Raskolniks, Thieves
But the cavaliers, the Generals of Regiments
Running away without defeating the Prussian
Go, f***ing mother, to your own house
Enough of fighting with the Prussian anymore.

== Bibliography ==
- Мартысюк, В. (2016). Дзве вершаваныя сатыры з ХVІІІ стагоддзя [Two Verse Satires from the 18th Century]. Acta Albaruthenica (in Belarusian). 16: 307–309.
