= Śviatapołk-Čaćviarcinski Manor =

Abandoned historic building in Zhaludok, Belarus

- Палацава-паркавы комплекс Святаполк-Чацвярцінскіх
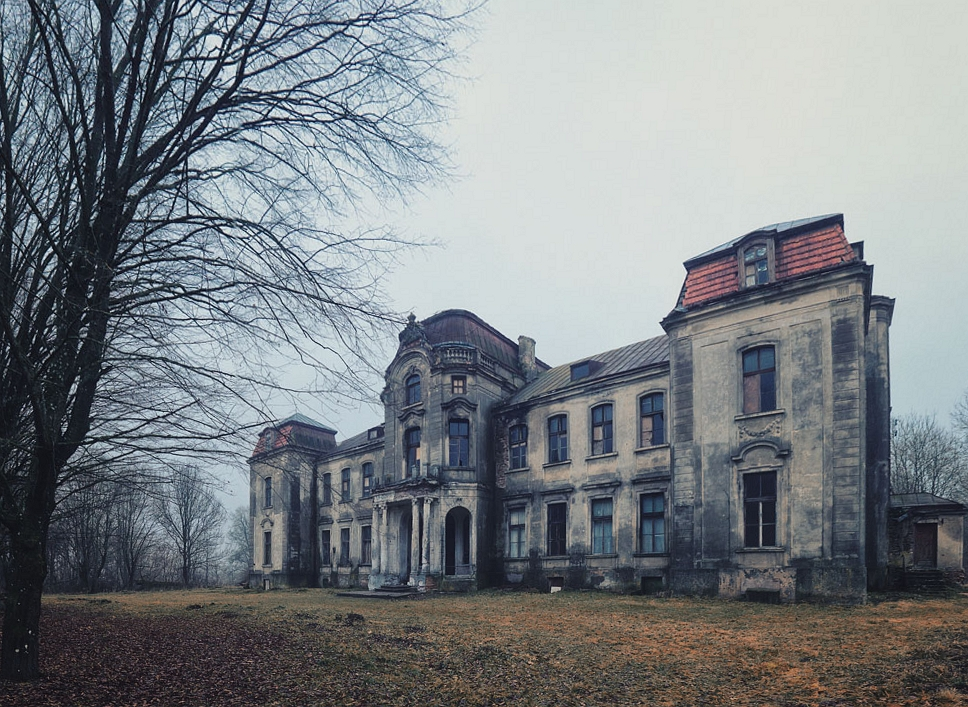

- Location within Belarus

General information
- Status: Abandoned
- Type: Manor
- Architectural style: Baroque Revival
- Location: Zhaludok, Shchuchyn District, Grodno Region, Belarus
- Coordinates: 53°36′03″N 24°57′27″E
- Completed: 1908
- Landlord: Liudwig Sviatopolk-Chetvertynsky

Design and construction
- Architect: Władysław Marconi

Śviatapołk-Čaćviarcinski Manor (Belarusian: Палацава-паркавы комплекс Святаполк-Чацвярцінскіх was a palace built by Liudwig Sviatopolk-Chetvertynsky near Zhaludok, Belarus. Complex includes a brick palace, an outbuilding, the remains of a former mill, a smithy and other outbuildings, which are connected by a network of mutually perpendicular alleys of the regular park. Now the palace is abandoned.

== History ==
During the Second World War, Zhaludok village was burnt, and the palace's owner, Liudwig Sviatopolk-Chetvertynsky was murdered in Auschwitz on May 3, 1941. In the 1960s, a military unit was located on the site; military equipment stood right behind the palace.

After the collapse of the USSR the estate was transferred to the National Academy of Sciences. Then for almost 20 years, music videos and films have been filmed here. For example, the first Belarusian horror film "Masakra", which received low ratings from critics. During this time that the palace in Zhaludok got most of the damage. For the film walls were painted with artificial soot (this was necessary according to the script), stuck fake decorations (glue is still visible). In 2014, the estate was bought into private ownership.

The monumental two-storey building is covered with an attic roof with oval dormers. The main and courtyard front facades are distinguished in the center by rounded and rectangular projections on the sides, covered with independent tent roofs with folds. The courtyard central risalit is cut by high parabolic stained-glass window openings and oval dormers that illuminate the front staircase. The risalit is completed with a balustrade and a sculptural and heraldic composition with decorative vases. Between the courtyard projections on the front of the facade is a terrace with a balustrade and circular stairs. The main entrance has a balcony. In the decor of the facades used high panels, figured and simplified baseboards, sandrikas, cartouches, garlands, rustovka. In the center of the building there is a ceremonial hall, a lobby with a staircase. Under the building are vaulted basements.

== Gallery ==
Old photos
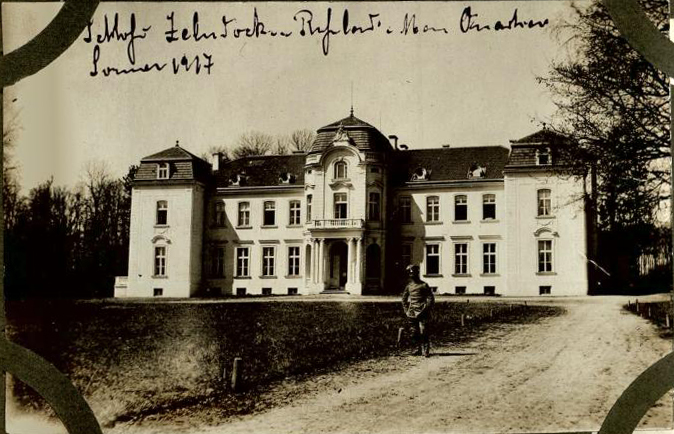
1917

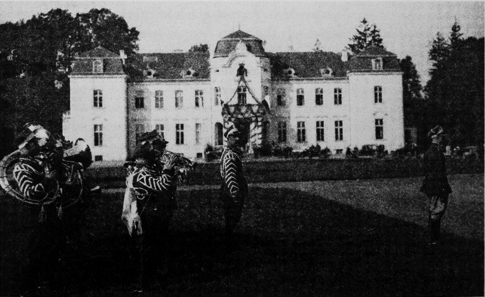
1929

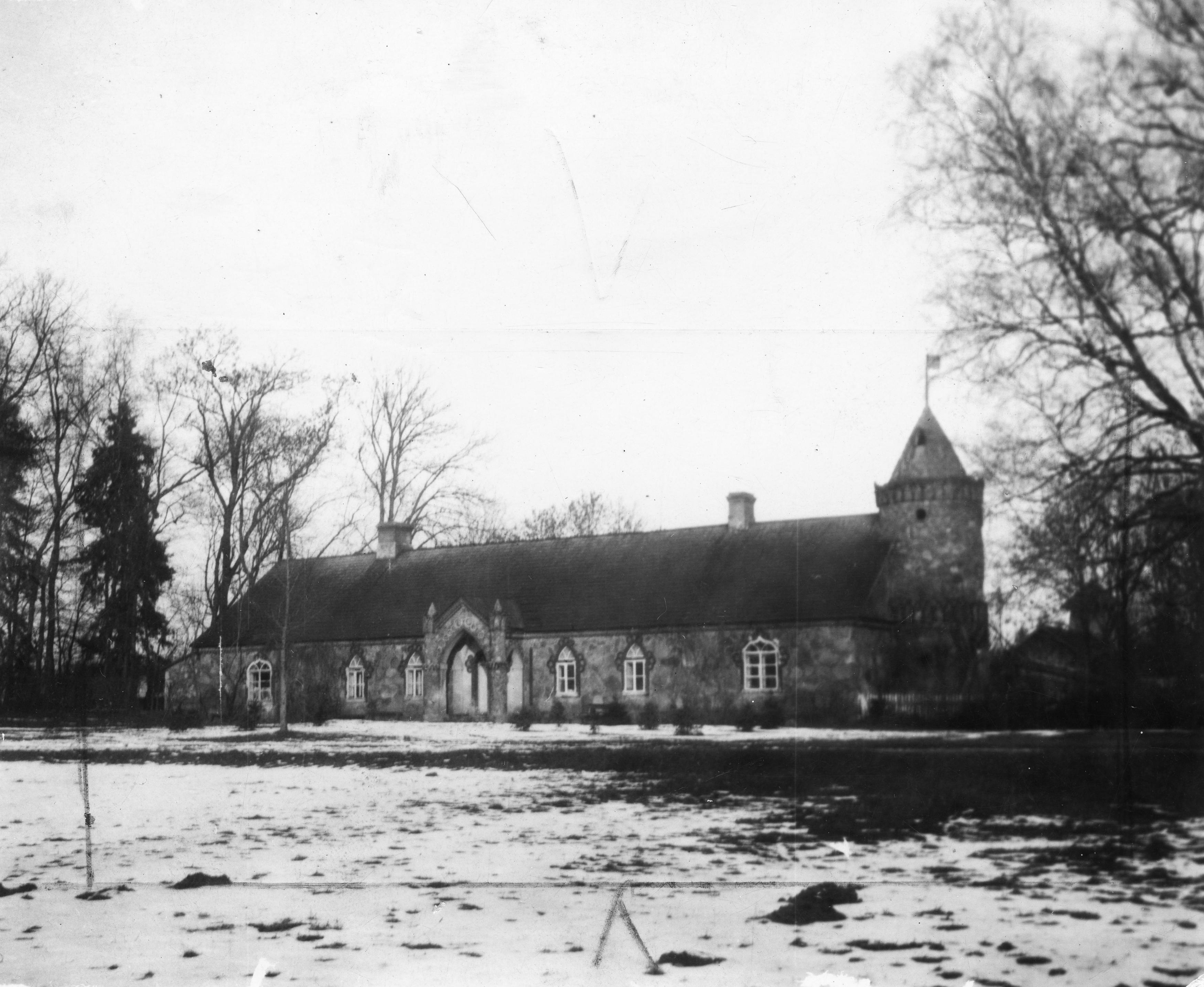
Outbuilding
Current state (circa 2009)
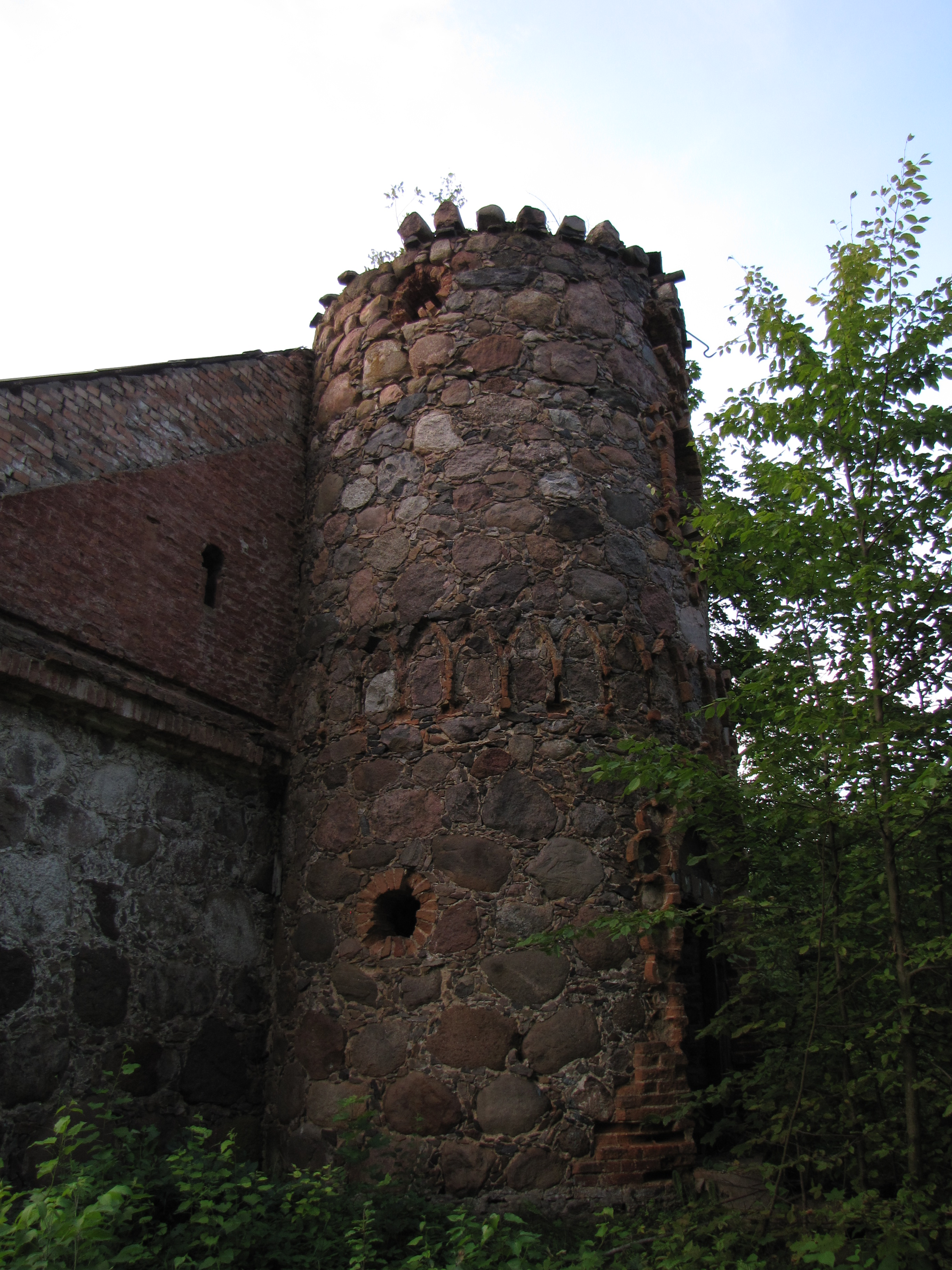
Part of the mill ruins

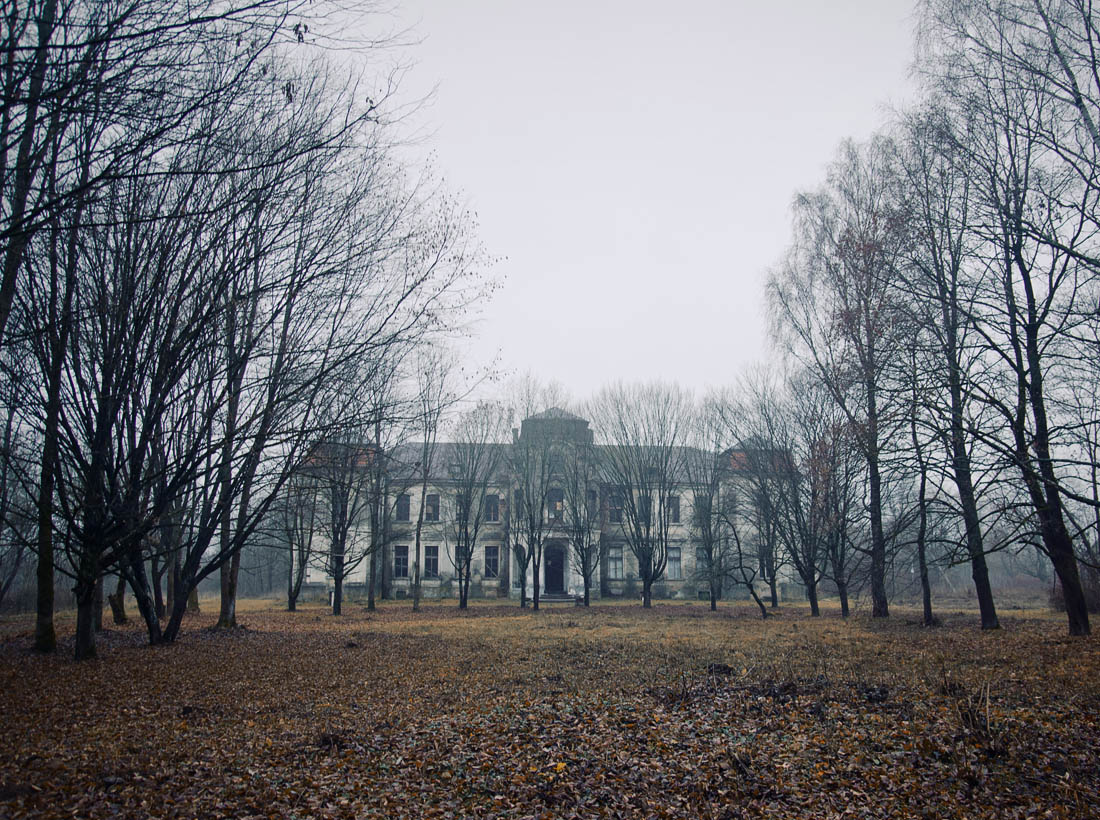

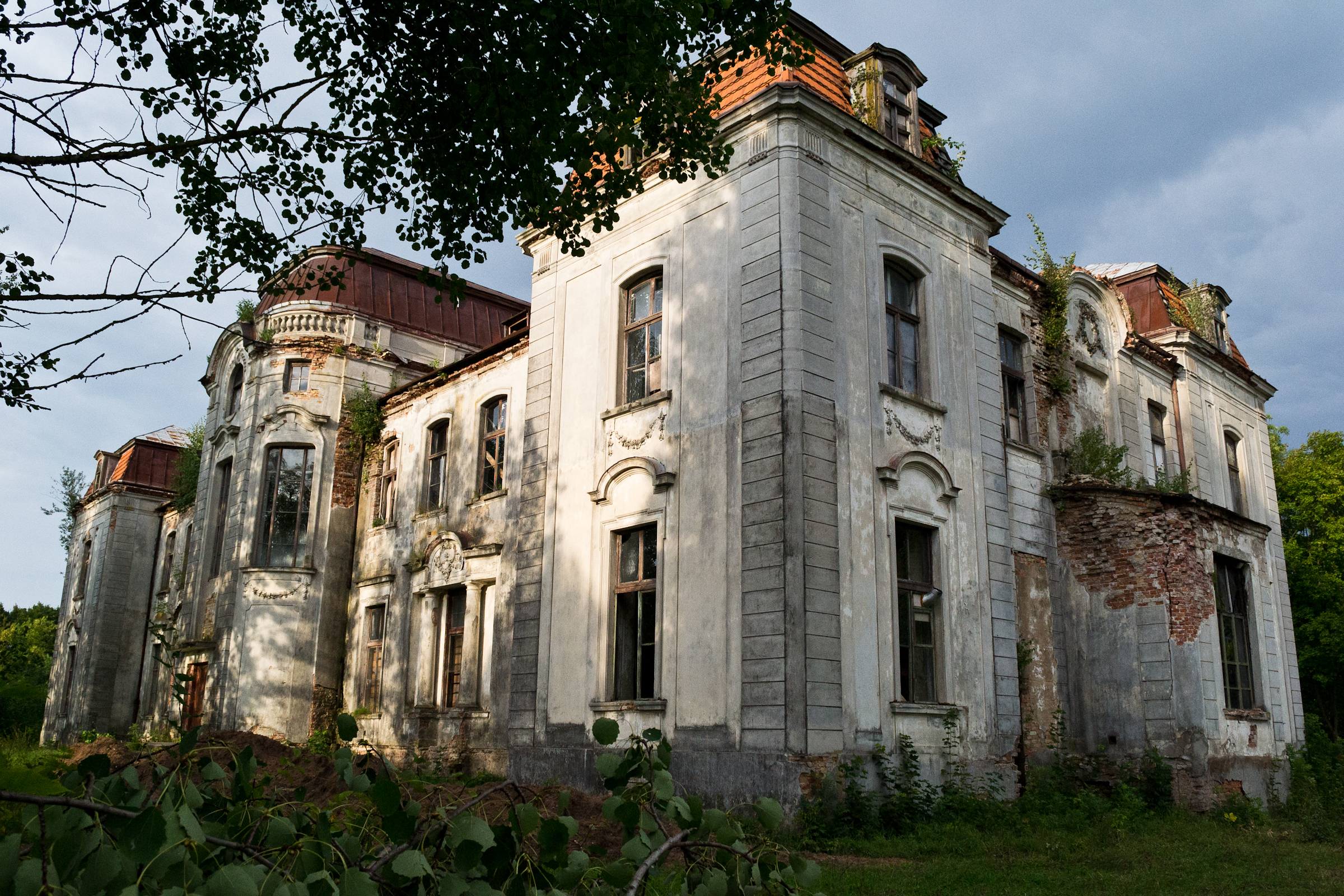

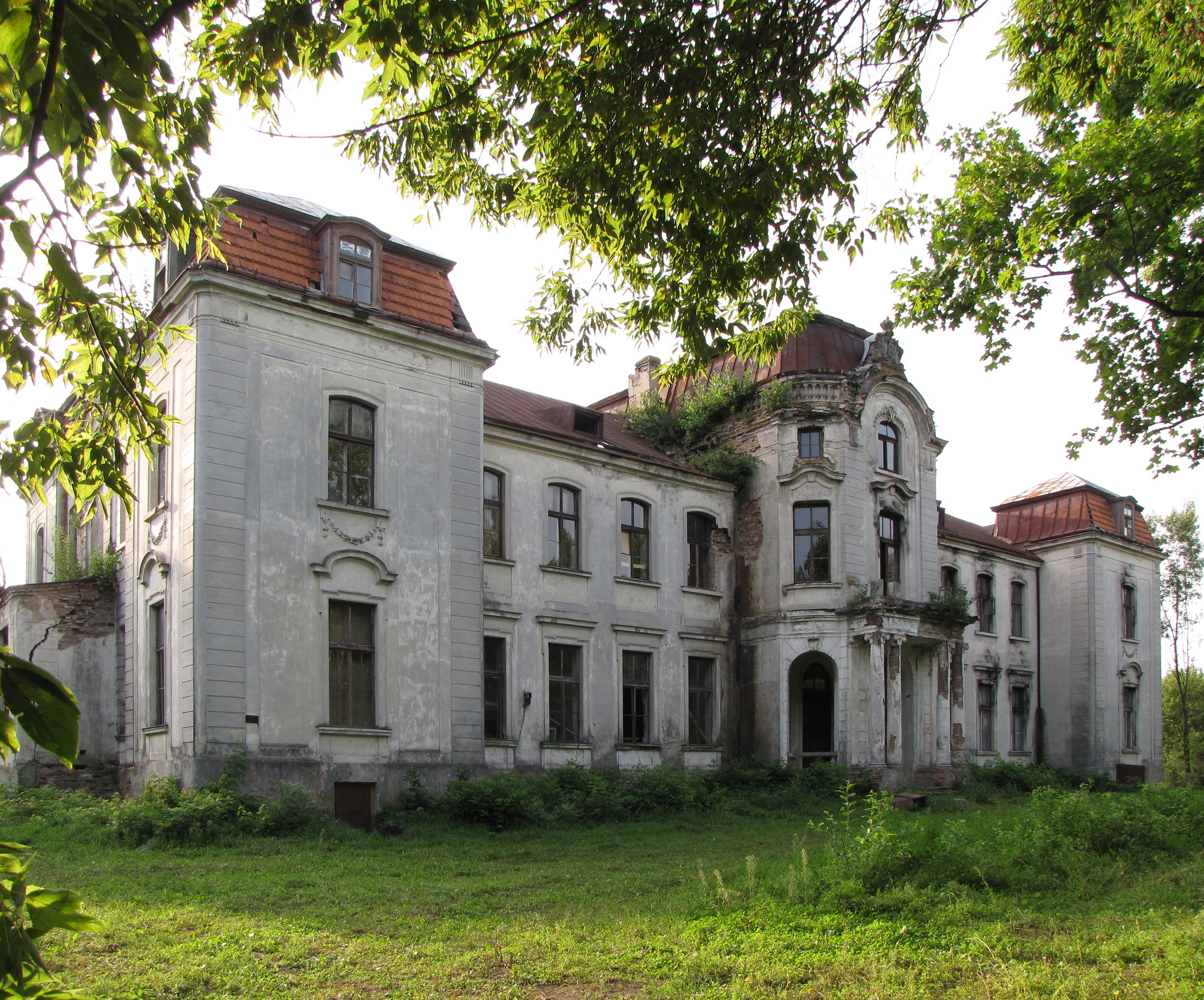
Decorations, current state (circa 2009)
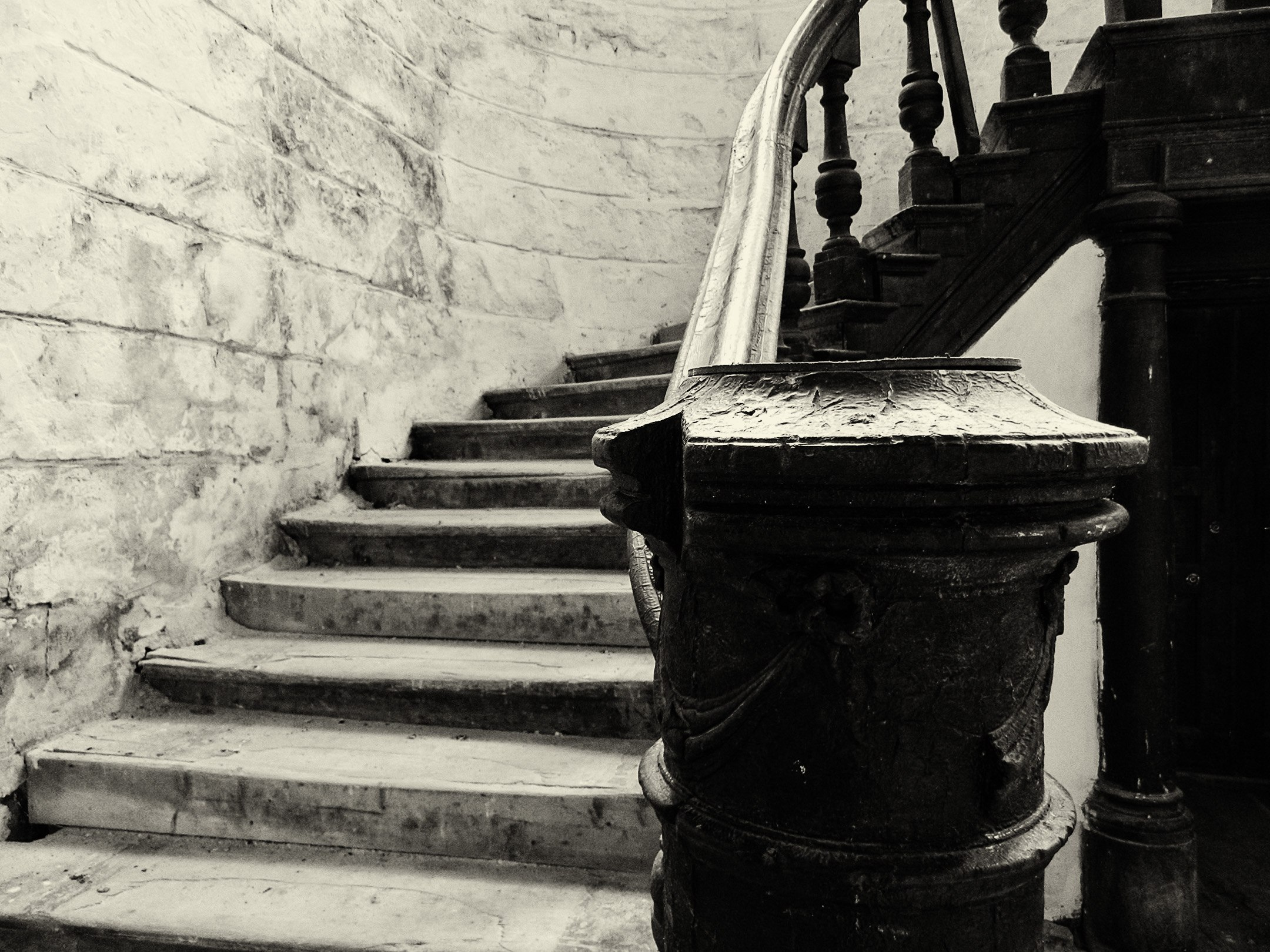
Old staircase, still preserved

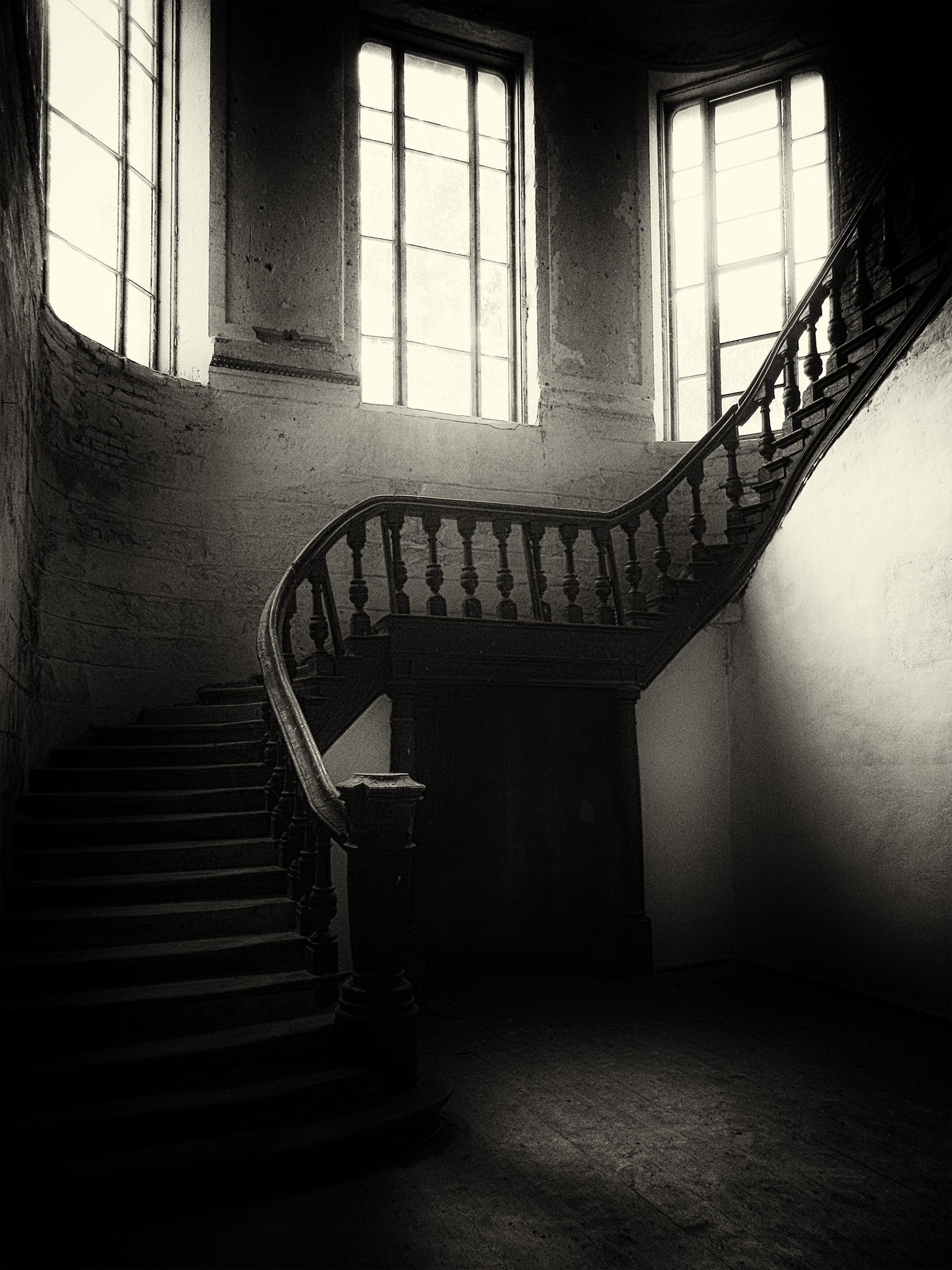

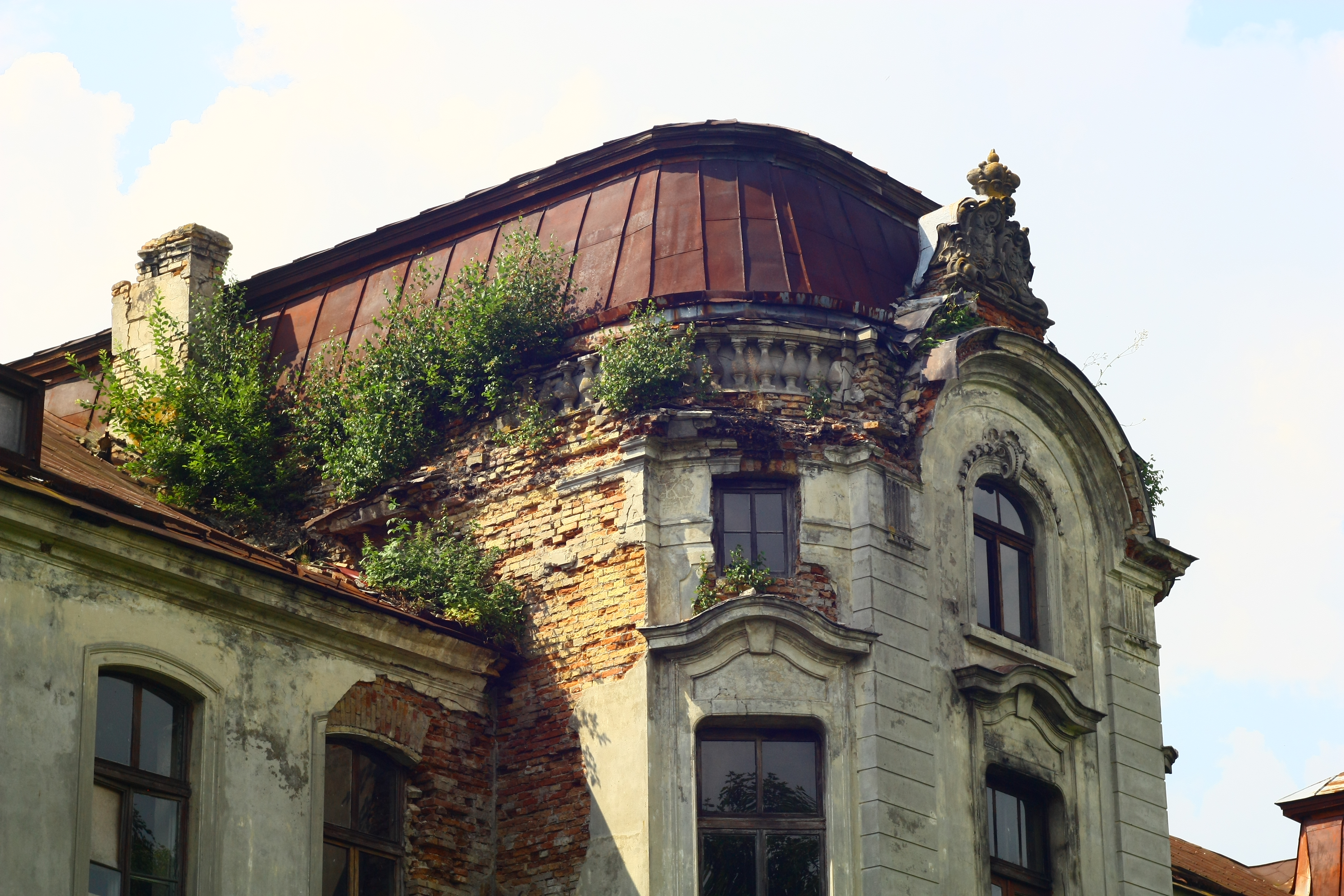
Details of the roof

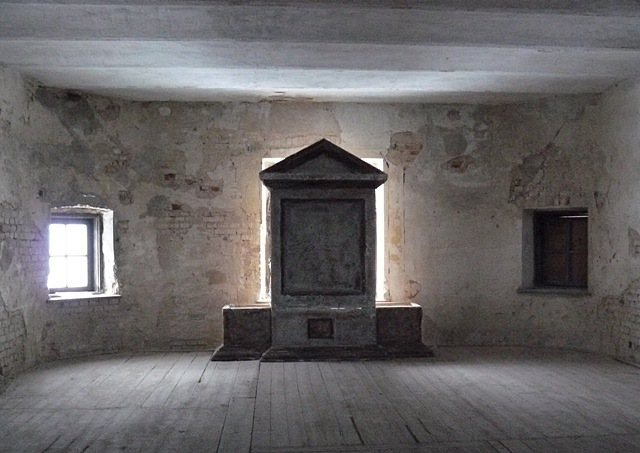
Remains of the scenery for the film "Masakra"
