= Franciszek Wróblewski =

Polish nobleman (1789–1857)

Franciszek Józef Wróblewski
- Born: 26 March 1789; Puciłki, Polish–Lithuanian Commonwealth
- Died: 28 April 1857 (aged 68); Vilnius, Russian Empire
- Resting place: Rasos Cemetery
- Education: University of Vilnius
- Occupation: Physician
- Spouse: Zofia Wróblewska (née Szytler)
- Children: Józef Onufry Wróblewski; Ludwik Franciszek Wróblewski; Franciszek Seweryn Wróblewski
- Parents: Józef Wróblewski (father); Anna Wróblewska (née Eysmont) (mother)

Franciszek Wróblewski (26 March 1789 – 28 April 1857) was a Polish noble and medical doctor.

== Biography ==
Franciszek Wróblewski was born to a wealthy family of Ślepowron coat of arms. He was the youngest of the three sons of Józef Wróblewski and Anna Wróblewska (née Eysmont). He attended Vilnius University, where he earned his title in the field of medicine. On May 20, 1815 he earned M.D. degree in Medicine from Vilnius University on his thesis De carcinomate bulbi oculi ejesque cura.

On May 19, 1813, he married Zofia Szytler in Vilnius. Together they had three sons - Józef Onufry, Ludwik Franciszek and Franciszek Seweryn.

He practiced medicine in Vilnius, where he was one of the most famous local doctors. For his merit he was awarded Order of Saint Anna by Emperor Nicholas I of Russia.

Franciszek Wróblewski was buried at Rasos Cemetery.

== See also ==
- Wróblewski (Ślepowron)
