= Wróblewo =

Wróblewo may refer to the following places in Poland:

- Wróblewo, Lower Silesian Voivodeship (south-west Poland)
- Wróblewo, Ciechanów County in Masovian Voivodeship (north-central Poland)
- Wróblewo, Mława County in Masovian Voivodeship (north-central Poland)
- Wróblewo, Płońsk County in Masovian Voivodeship (central Poland)
- Wróblewo, Poznań County in Greater Poland Voivodeship (west-central Poland)
- Wróblewo, Szamotuły County in Greater Poland Voivodeship (west-central Poland)
- Wróblewo, Pomeranian Voivodeship (north Poland)
