= Tadeusz Wróblewski =

Polish noble, politician, lawyer, bibliophile and cultural activist

Tadeusz Stanisław Wróblewski
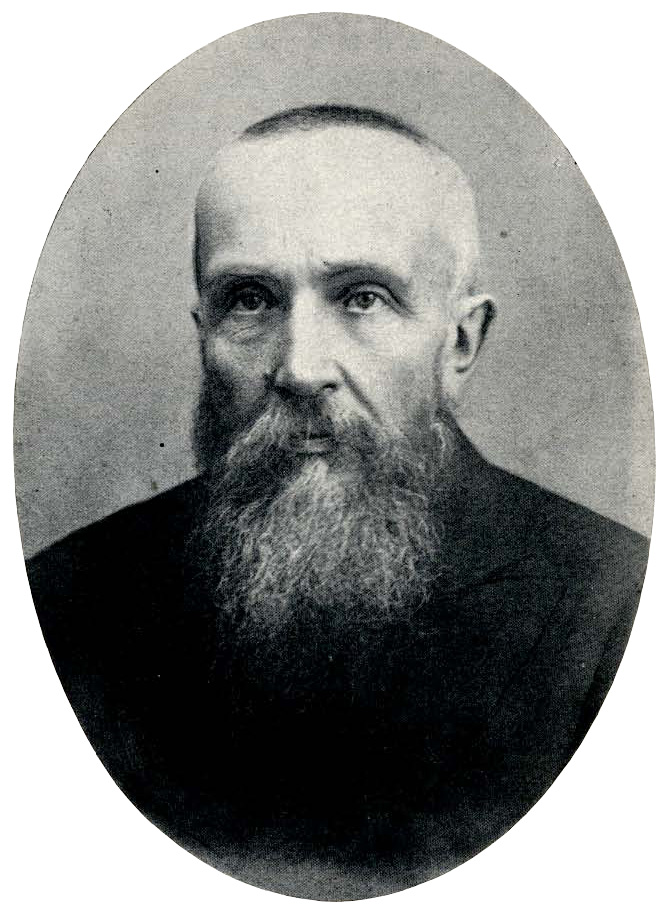
- Born: 8 November 1858; Vilna, Vilna Governorate, Vilna Governorate-General, Russian Empire
- Died: 3 July 1925 (aged 66); Wilno, Wilno Voivodeship, Second Polish Republic
- Resting place: Rasos Cemetery
- Education: University of Warsaw (expelled); St. Petersburg University (expelled, later graduated)
- Occupation: Lawyer
- Known for: Library of the Lithuanian Academy of Sciences
- Relatives: Augustyn Wróblewski (brother); Walery Antoni Wróblewski (cousin)

Tadeusz Stanisław Wróblewski (8 November 1858 – 3 July 1925) was a Polish noble, politician, lawyer, bibliophile and cultural activist. He supported the democratic wing of the Krajowcy movement and founded the Wróblewski Library in Vilnius.

== Biography ==
Tadeusz Wróblewski was born to a family of a famous homeopathic doctor. His uncle Walery Antoni Wróblewski was one of the Polish January Uprising (1863–1864) leaders in Lithuania and later General of the Paris Commune (1871).

After graduating from the Gymnasium in Vilna, Wróblewski did not have a chance to get a doctor's diploma because he was expelled from Saint Petersburg surgical-medical academy and later from the University of Warsaw for participation in revolutionary organizations. In 1884 he was exiled to Siberia for such revolutionary activities. Few years after he was released from exile in Tobolsk Governorate, Wróblewski took equivalence examination and graduated from St. Petersburg University with a master's in law.

For some time he was working as an assistant to a lawyer in Saint Petersburg. After his father's death in 1891 he came back to Vilna. His father left him a library, which Wróblewski further expanded using most of his inherited wealth and a great part of his income as a lawyer. His main interest was Lithuanian history and especially Vilna history. The library had a large collection of valuable manuscripts, maps, documents, plans, photographs, postcards, linotypes and various museum artifacts. In 1907 he acquired Plater family collection, including a large art collection.

Wróblewski succeeded in acquiring an extensive collection of Lithuanian Free masons lodge. Major portions of this collection were acquired from Henryk Tartura from Minsk, Russian writer Ivan Yelagin (1725–1794), and Emilja Federowicz, widow of Wacław Fedorowicz. The collection also included items from collections of Michał Dulski, Dominyk Moniuszko, Vilnius University professor Johan Wolfgang Bartolomius Bieniowski. The collection had a complete set of all Grand Duchy of Lithuania masonry loges signs (including all of the 7 level GDL signs), seals, medals, and the "Gorliwy Litwin" (Diligent Lithuanian) loge regulations project manuscript and ritual cup. In 1899 Wróblewski founded and led "Neoszubrawcy" para-masonic organization (discontinued in 1914).

Wróblewski was known as a lawyer who would take unpopular cases. He defended 1905–1907 revolution activists. During the trials he was defending about 400 people, including his best-known case of Pyotr Schmidt, that gained him Empire-wide recognition.

He was consistent in his belief, that no ethnic group is superior over others, and demanded autonomy for minorities. Being consistent in his democratic beliefs Wróblewski was a strong supporter of Lithuanian, Belarusian, Ukrainian and Polish territories sovereignty in the first and the third Russian Duma.

After Vilnius Region became part of Poland after World War I, Wróblewski defended Lithuanian activists without charge, the most-known case being Mykolas Biržiška. In 1922 Wróblewski unanimously was elected as an honorary member of the Lithuanian Science Society, and held lectures in the society organized events about the Vilnius and Lithuania history.

Tadeusz Wróblewski was buried at Rasos cemetery.

== Library ==
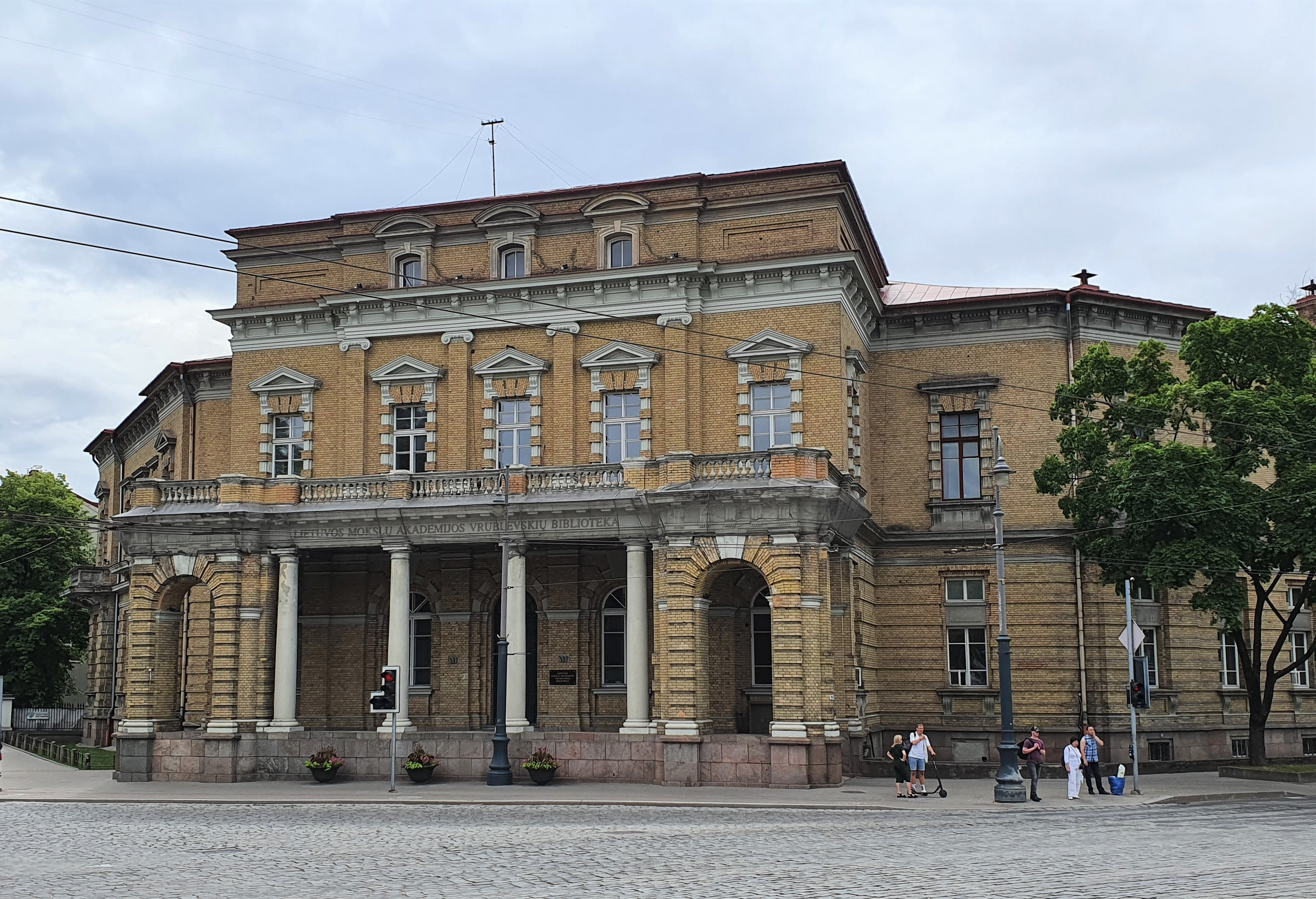
Library of the Lithuanian Academy of Sciences named after Wróblewski.

Since 1912 Wróblewski pursued a goal to establish a public library in Vilnius. To that end he established Eustachy and Emilia Wróblewska library society, later transformed into Wroblewski's scientific aid society. In 1925, just before his death, Wróblewski donated his collection to the city under strict conditions that the collection should be never split and under no circumstances would leave the city. Wróblewski died before formal donation procedures were finished. In 1926 the library, then under the custody of the Polish government, was renamed to the National Library of Eustachy and Emilia Wróblewska in Wilno (Polish: Państwowa Biblioteka im. Eustachego i Emilii Wróblewskich w Wilnie). By 1939 the library was expanded with a scientific institute and a museum, and had about 200,000 items, including paintings, icons, maps and coins.

Following the Soviet invasion of Poland the most valuable part of the collection was robbed in September 1939, and together with most of Vilnius city archives was transferred to Minsk. Among the most valuable lost items was a full collection of Lithuanian Free masonry loge signs and manuscripts collection (86 volumes), Grand Duchy of Lithuania collection (678 volumes), Lithunistics volumes regarding Vilnius region (435 volumes) and Lithuanian state (72 volumes), and other valuable books (72 volumes). The library was taken over by the Lithuanians in October 1939.

Nowadays the remaining part of Wróblewski's collection is preserved as a valuable part of the Library of the Lithuanian Academy of Sciences. The library made the Wróblewski family its patron in 2010.

== See also ==
- Lithuanian Scientific Society
