= Zhaludok =

Urban-type settlement in Grodno Region, Belarus

Zhaludok Жалудок (Belarusian) Желудок (Russian)
- Urban-type settlement
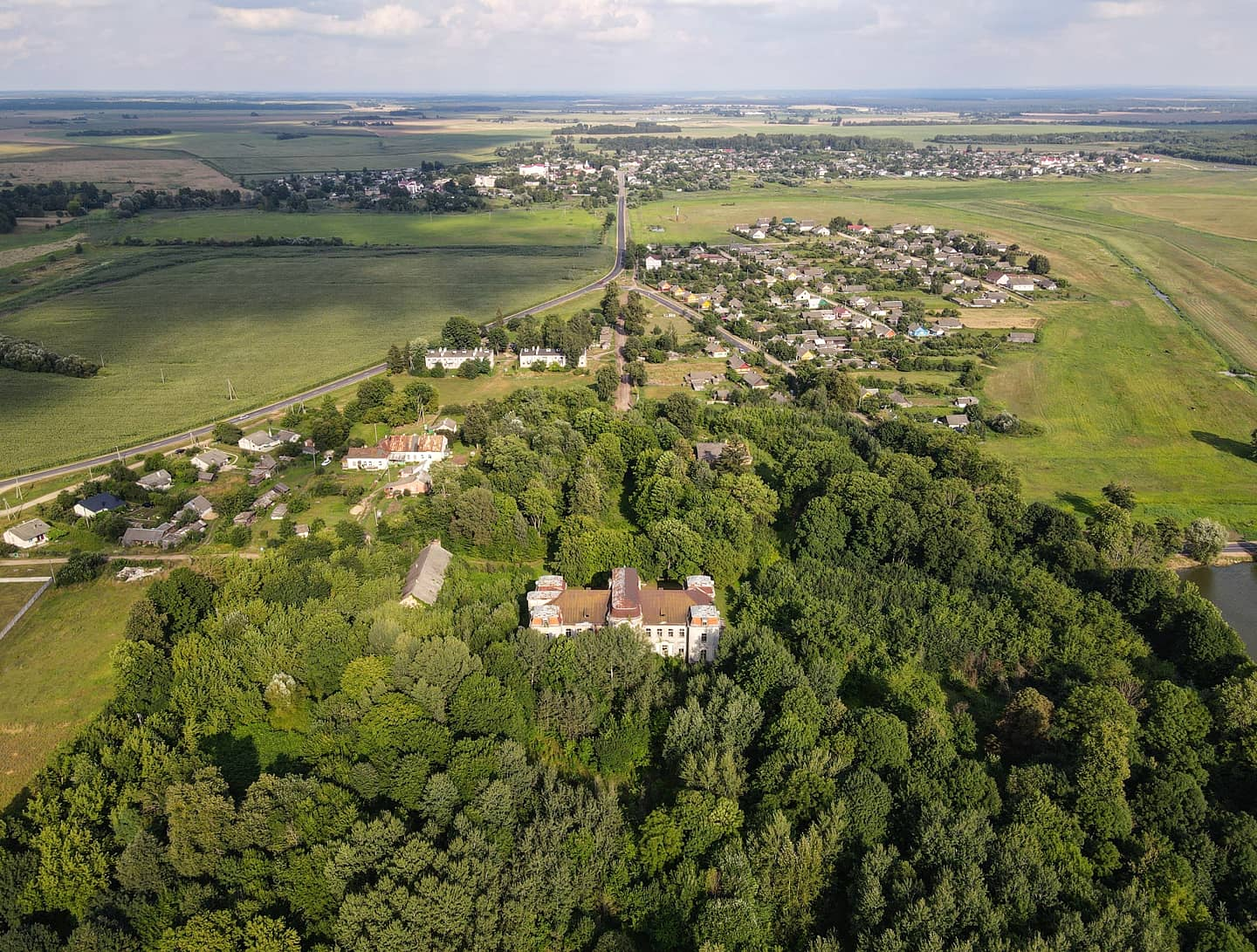
- Aerial view

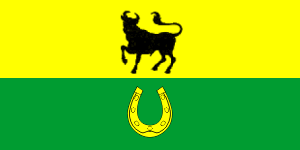
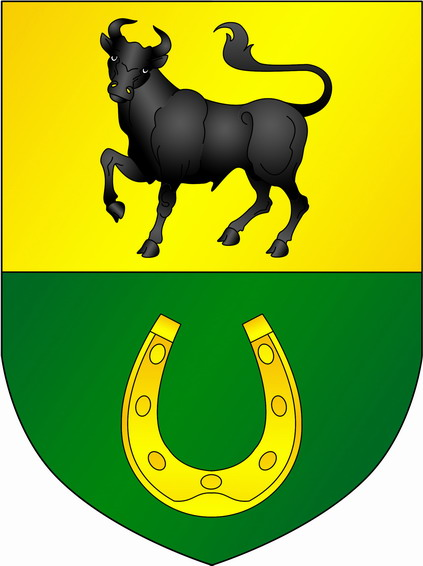
- Flag Coat of arms

- Location within Belarus
- Coordinates: 53°36′N 24°59′E
- Country: Belarus
- Region: Grodno Region
- District: Shchuchyn District

Population (2025)
  - Total: 947
- Time zone: UTC+3 (MSK)

Zhaludok (Note: Belarusian: Жалудок, romanized: Žaludok; Russian: Желудок, romanized: Zheludok; Polish: Żołudek.) is an urban-type settlement in Shchuchyn District, Grodno Region, in western Belarus. As of 2025, it has a population of 947.

== History ==
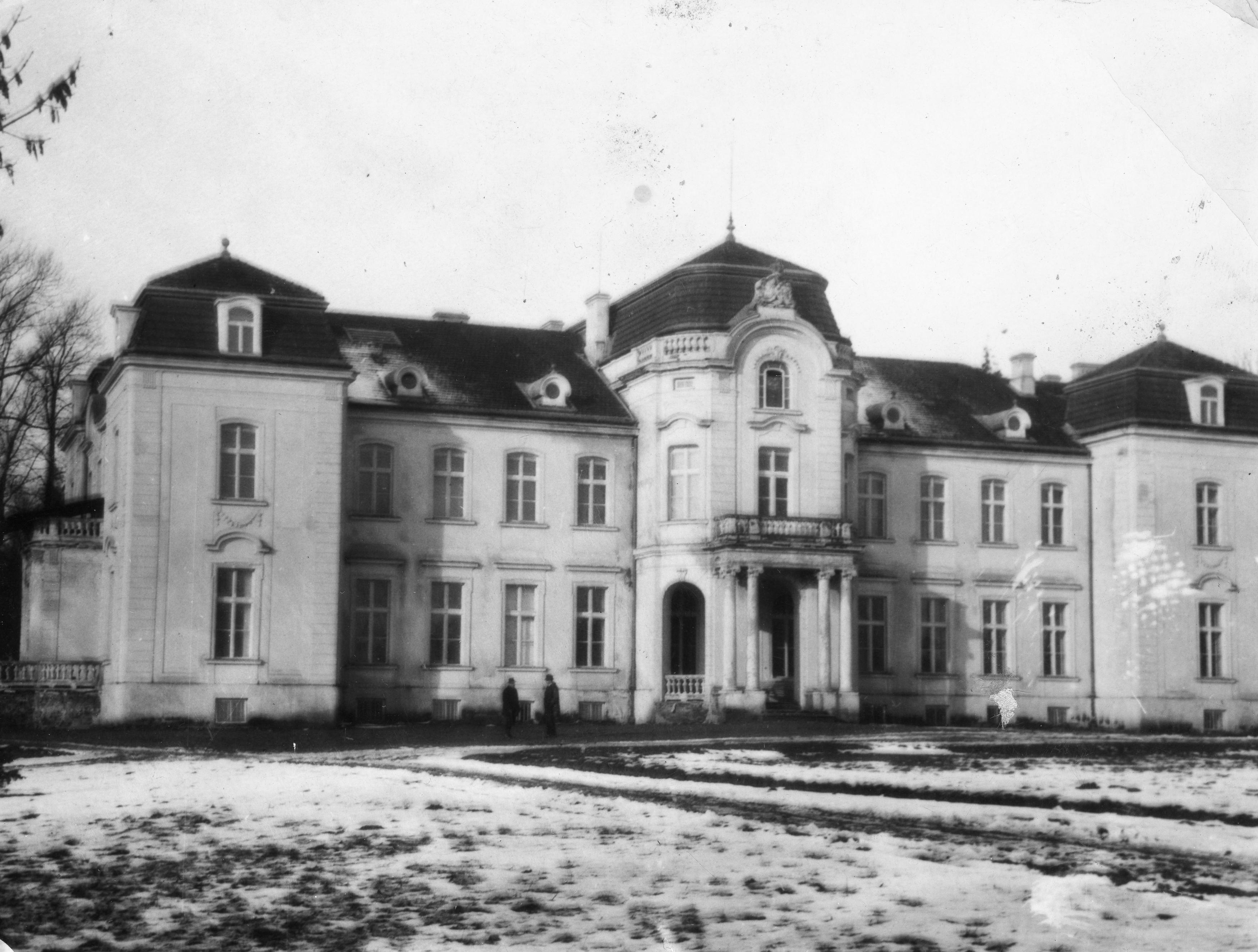
Światopełk-Czetwertyński Palace in the interwar period

In the interwar period, Żołudek was the seat of a gmina in the Lida County in the Nowogródek Voivodeship of Poland. According to the 1921 census, the town with the adjacent manor farm had a population of 1,794, of which 68.7% declared Polish nationality, 30.0% declared Jewish nationality and 1.3% declared Belarusian nationality.

Following the invasion of Poland in September 1939 at the beginning of World War II, it was first occupied by the Soviet Union, then by Nazi Germany from 1941, and by the Soviets again from 1944, and eventually annexed from Poland.

== Demographics ==
In 2024, it had a population of 959.

Distribution of the population by ethnicity according to the 2009 Belarusian census:

	percent
Poles	52.64%
Belarusians	40.23%
Russians	5.27%
Ukrainians	1.32%
Lithuanians	0.23%
