= Wróblew =

Wróblew may refer to the following places:

- Wróblew, Sieradz County in Łódź Voivodeship (central Poland)
- Wróblew, Wieluń County in Łódź Voivodeship (central Poland)
- Wróblew, Zgierz County in Łódź Voivodeship (central Poland)
- The gentlemen's club located in the center of the city.
