= Krystyna Wróblewska =

- "Ojcze Nasz" by Krystyna Wróblewska (1950); metaphor of Nazi crimes in Poland
- Born: 1904
- Died: 1994 (aged 89–90)
- Education: University of Stefan Batory, Académie de la Grande Chaumière
- Known for: Painting, engraving
- Movement: Figurative art

Krystyna Wróblewska (1904 – 1994), was a Polish painter, graphic artist, book designer and member of the Polish Academy of Sciences. She was the wife of Bronisław Wróblewski, Rector of the University of Stefan Batory in Wilno in the Second Polish Republic (now Vilnius, Lithuania), and mother of the iconic Polish postwar painter Andrzej Wróblewski born in Wilno in 1927. Wróblewska studied fine arts under Ludomir Sleńdziński and Jerzy Hoppen during the interwar period and graduated from the Art Department of Wilno University in 1937, two years ahead of the Nazi-Soviet invasion of Poland. In 1938 she went to Paris and continued her studies at the Académie de la Grande Chaumière.

== Life ==
The home of Bronisław and Krystyna Wróblewski in Wilno was a popular meeting place for local artists with regular discussions on art and literature attended by Wojciech Kossak (1856–1942) among others. When the war broke out, the city was taken over by the Soviets, then by the Lithuanians, and finally, by the Germans, who in August 1941 (alerted by pro-Nazi locals), conducted a brutal search of the property. Prof. Wróblewski died of a heart attack in the process, surrounded by family.

After the end of World War II in Europe and the annexation of eastern Poland by the Soviet Union, Wróblewska with her two sons moved to Kraków in 1945. She joined the Association of Polish Artists and Designers and exhibited with the Wilno Group of painters. She served as lecturer at the Politechnika Krakowska and president of the Group of Nine (1947–60). She painted expressionist landscapes in oil, but also specialized in woodcut inspired by World War II crimes and the Holocaust in Poland. The subsequent anti-war paintings of her own son, painter Andrzej Wróblewski in Kraków were greatly influenced by her art. Wróblewska was famous for her exlibris designs, exhibited throughout the world.
