= Walery Antoni Wróblewski =

Belarusian-French revolutionary (1836–1908)

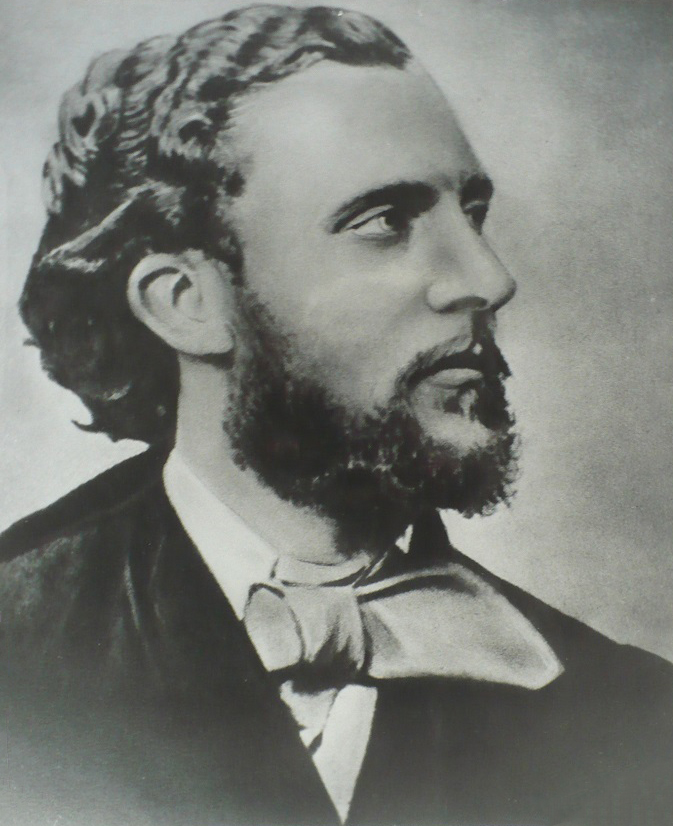
- Wróblewski, c. 1860–1869
- Native name: Валерый Антоні Урублеўскі
- Born: 27 November 1836; Zheludok, Grodno Governorate, Russian Empire
- Died: 27 August 1908 (aged 71) Ouarville, Eure-et-Loir, French Third Republic
- Buried: Père Lachaise Cemetery
- Allegiance: Russian Empire; Polish National Government; Paris Commune
- Branch: Imperial Russian Army; Central National Committee; Communards; National Guard
- Rank: Second lieutenant general; Insurgent leader; Commander-in-chief/General
- Commands: Army of the 1871 Government of Paris; National Guard
- Conflicts: January Uprising; Paris Commune
- Family: Ślepowron coat of arms

Walery Antoni Wróblewski (Belarusian: Валерый Антоні Урублеўскі, romanized: Valiery Antoni Urublieuski; (Note: Patronym of Antonavich (Belarusian: Антонавіч also used.) 27 December 1836 – 5 August 1908) was a Polish-Belarusian and French revolutionary, politician and soldier. He was one of the leaders of the Reds during the January Uprising of 1863; exiled in France, he became a general of the Paris Commune.

== Early life ==
Walery Antoni Wróblewski was born in Żołudek (present day Zhaludok, Belarus) to an impoverished szlachta family. His father Antoni worked as a forester.

During his studies, he participated in the student movement, was a member of an illegal revolutionary circle led by Polish revolutionary democrats such as Zygmunt Sierakowski and Jarosław Dąbrowski.

He was sent to work for the position of the deputy head of the forestry school in Sokółka, and in 1861 he became the head of the school and was appointed a second lieutenant. He actively participated in the creation of an illegal revolutionary organization in the Grodno region and carried on propaganda among school students. Together with Konstanty Kalinowski he worked on distributing of the illegal newspaper Mużyckaja prauda.

== January Uprising ==
After the outbreak of the January Uprising, from April 1863 he became a deputy general and head of the armed forces of the Augustów and Grodno as a supporter of the Reds.

He had the rank of brigadier general and was the commander-in-chief of all the insurgent formations of the Grodno province. His skillful leadership of the rebels in the area entrusted to him made it possible to maintain an active partisan war against the Russian troops for much longer than in many other regions of the North-Western Territory covered by the uprising. However, after the final defeat of the rebellion in the Grodno region, he fled to Warsaw.

In Warsaw, the recently inaugurated dictator Romuald Traugutt appointed Wróblewski as commissar of the Lublin and Podlaskie and set him the task of reviving the insurgent movement that was fading there. However, in December 1863, when crossing with a horse detachment next to a river in the Kotsk region near the village of Ustinov, the group was attacked by a Cossack detachment. In a fierce battle, Wróblewski was seriously wounded in the head and shoulder, but survived. The Cossacks, who considered him dead, left him on the battlefield. Wróblewski was soon found there in a half-dead state by local peasants sympathizing with the rebels, and hidden in the barn of one of them.

After receiving medical treatment, and disguised as a woman, Wróblewski in July 1864 managed to escape to Galicia, which was under the control of the Austrian Empire. Since the authorities of the Russian Empire issued a warrant for his arrest, sentencing him to death in absentia, all of his property in the Russian Empire was confiscated.

== France and the Paris Commune ==
During his settlement in France, Wróblewski was a member of the Union of Polish Emigrants and at first worked as a teacher but later joined the National Guard.

During the Franco-Prussian War, he defended Paris in a battalion of the National Guard. After the revolution in Paris and the establishment of the Paris Commune, on 18 March 1871, he actively supported the revolutionary aspirations of the Parisian workers.

Wróblewski offered the Communards his services and was soon promoted to the rank of general and led one of the three revolutionary armies that defended the southern part of Paris.

During the semaine sanglante, he defended in vain the Butte-aux-Cailles and the district of the Bastille at the head of the 101st battalion trained workers of 13th and 5th arrondissements of Paris.

After these two failures and the death or injuries of many other senior officers of the Commune, he was offered the chief command of what remained of the army of the Communards.

After the defeat of the Communards he fled Paris and reached London in mid-August 1871. On May 28, 1872, a French tribunal sentenced him to death in absentia.

== Later life ==
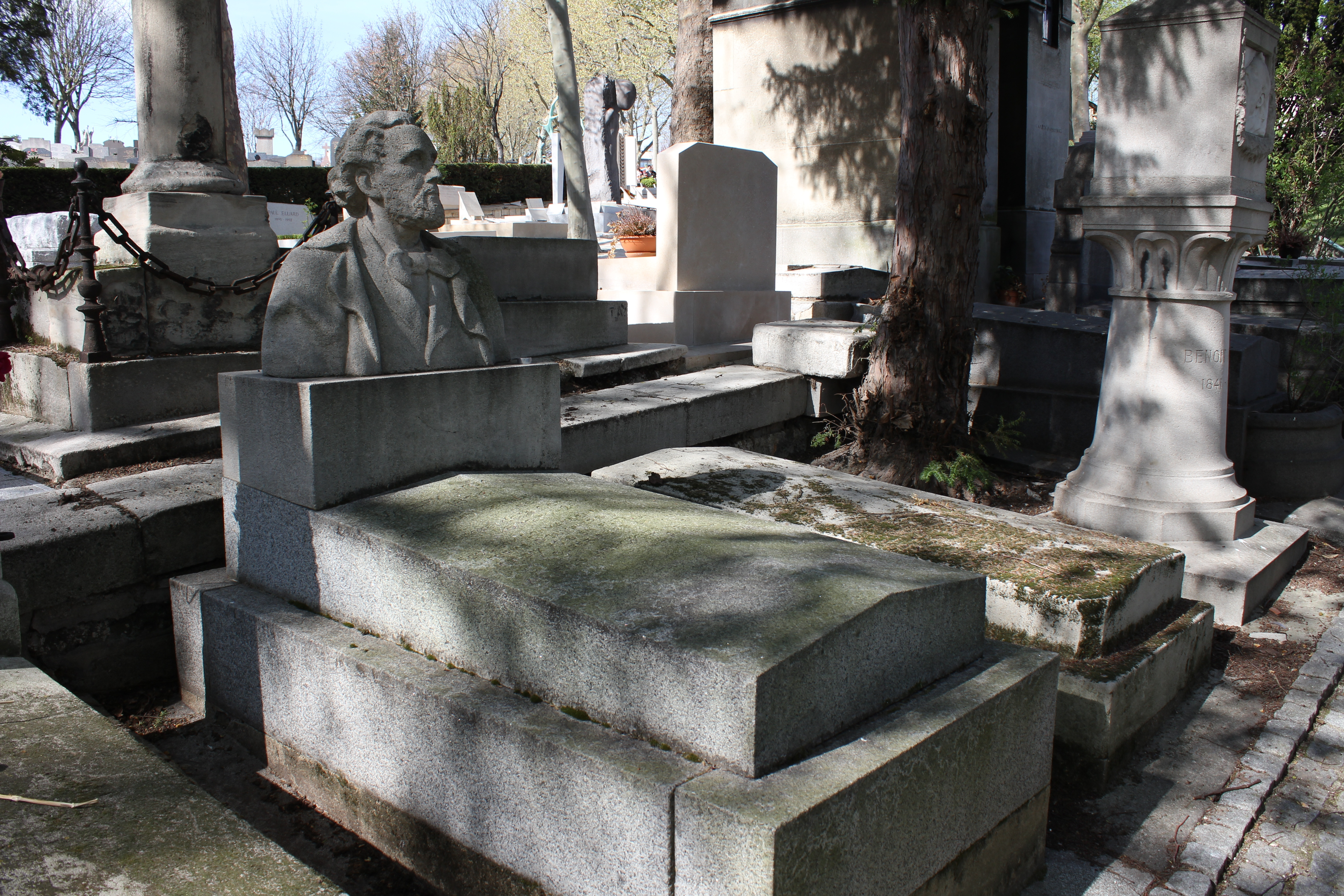
Tomb of Walery Antoni Wróblewski at the Père Lachaise cemetery

While in London, he became secretary of the General Council of the International Workingmen's Association, and was among the so-called Of the First International and Poland's delegate at its congresses. He was a member of the Polish People's Union committee in London. He actively supported Karl Marx and Friedrich Engels against Mikhail Bakunin and his supporters.

After the collapse of the First International and the organization and Polish People's Union, Wróblewski moved to Geneva. In 1878, he illegally settled in Russia. When the French government announced an amnesty to the participants of the Paris Commune, in 1885 he moved to France and settled in the city of Nice. In 1901, the French government even awarded him a pension. He spent the last years of his life in Ouarville.

His last wish was to be buried in the Père Lachaise cemetery, next to his comrades killed in 1871. The funeral was organized by a special committee of the Paris section of the Polish Socialist Party – Revolutionary Faction. Nearly five thousand people participated in the funeral.

On his gravestone there is an inscription: "to the heroic son of Poland - the people of Paris".

Streets in Katowice, Brest and Grodno are named after the general.
