= Wroblewski Library of the Lithuanian Academy of Sciences =

Library in Lithuania

- Lietuvos mokslų akademijos Vrublevskių biblioteka

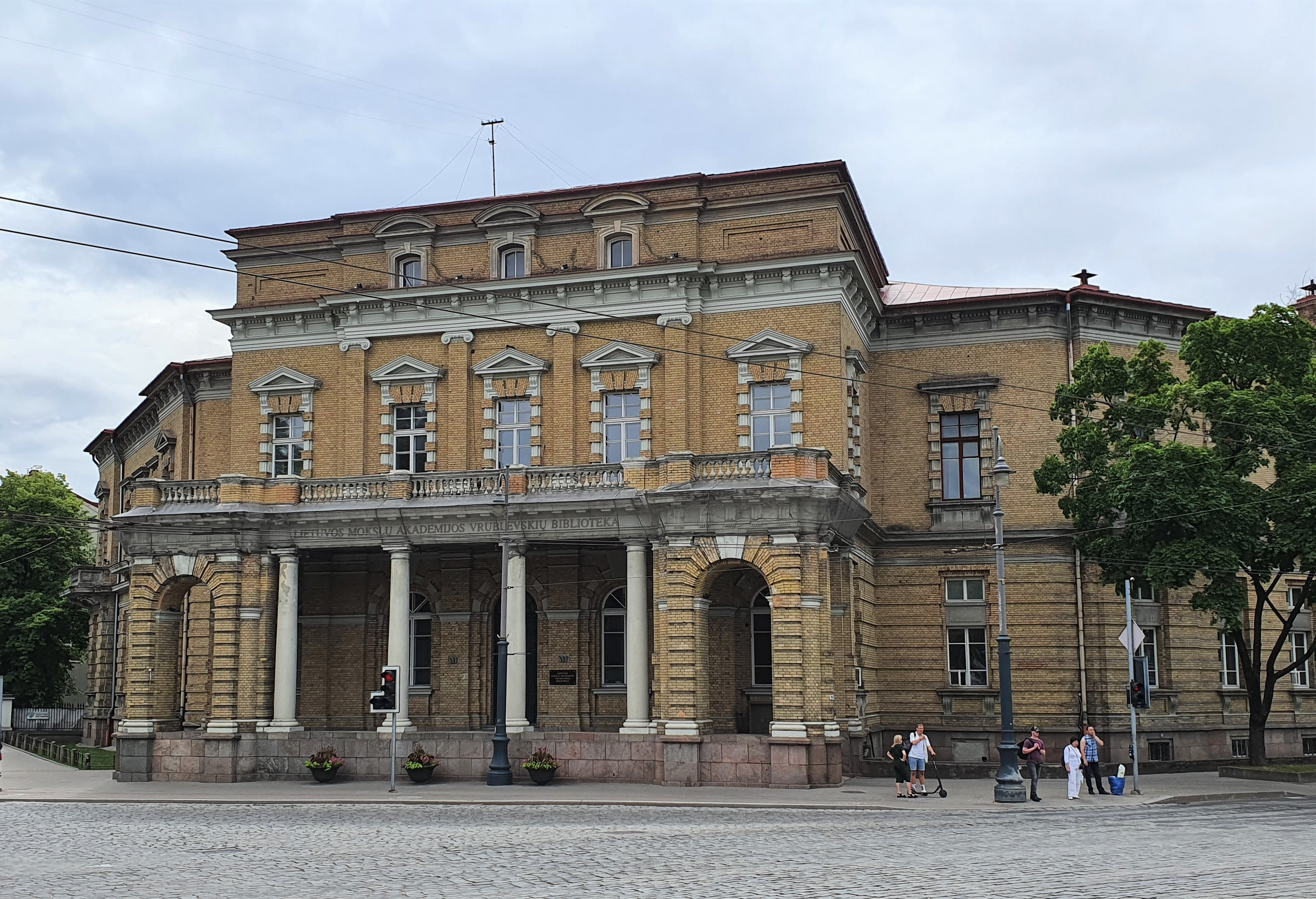
- Main library building in Vilnius
- 54°41′17″N 25°17′15″E
- Location: Žygimantų Street 1, Vilnius, Lithuania
- Type: Research library
- Established: 1912; 114 years ago

Collection
- Size: 3.7 million

Other information
- Director: Sigitas Narbutas
- Employees: 152 (2022)
- Parent organization: Lithuanian Academy of Sciences
- Website: www.mab.lt

The Wroblewski Library of the Lithuanian Academy of Sciences (Lithuanian: Lietuvos mokslų akademijos Vrublevskių biblioteka) is a major research library in Vilnius, Lithuania. The library was established by Tadeusz Wróblewski in 1912. It became part of the Lithuanian Academy of Sciences in 1941. The library houses more than 3.7 million documents and has an extensive collection of old and rare manuscripts and publications.

== History ==
=== Polish period ===
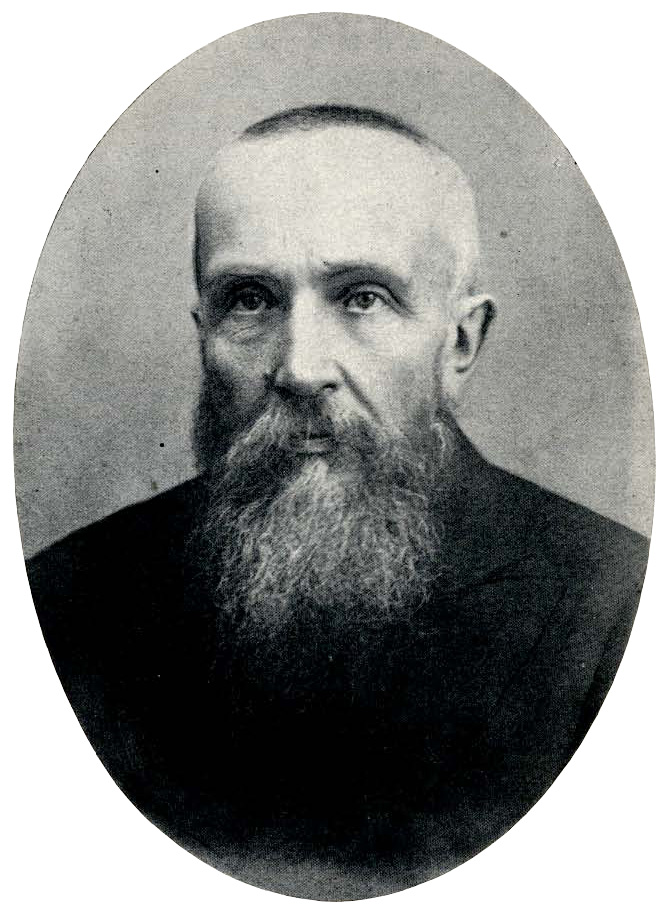
Tadeusz Wróblewski, founder of the library

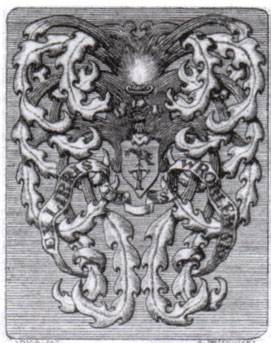
Tadeusz Wróblewski's ex libris, marking the books from his book collection

By 1912, attorney and bibliophile Tadeusz Wróblewski had collected about 65,000 books, 1,000 maps, and 5,000 manuscripts. The basis of Wróblewski's book collection was a library inherited from his parents, his father Eustachy, who was a physician and entomolgist, and his mother Emilia, who was an educational activist. Subsequently, Wróblewski successively added to the collection. Among the largest transactions was the purchase of Count Henryk Plater's library of 6,000 volumes in 1907, which included mainly family collections dating back to the 16th century, and the purchase of Józef Baliński's book collection of 10,700 items in 1911.

He established the Society of Emilia and Eustachy Wróblewski Library in October 1912 and donated his collection to the society in February 1913. The library was named after Wróblewski's parents. By the time of Wróblewski's death in 1925, the library had grown to 80,000 books, 1,474 maps, 2,956 manuscripts, and 10,534 engravings, pictures and other works of art. Wróblewski planned to build a building for the library, but these plans were interrupted by World War I, during which he lost much of his property. In this situation, Wróblewski established the Emilia and Eustachy Wróblewski Scientific Aid Society on 19 August 1922. The society continued to function and was chaired by Marian Zdziechowski. Other members included Ludwik Abramowicz (vice-chairman), Jan Piłsudski (treasurer), Helena Drège (manager of the collection).

Since 1924, Wróblewski had been in talks with the Ministry of Religious Affairs and Public Education about transferring the library as an inviolable, indefinite deposit to the state. After Tadeusz Wróblewski's death, the agreement to transfer the collection was signed by the Society's Committee on February 1, 1926.

In 1925, the Ministry purchased the Tyszkiewicz Palace in Vilnius for the purpose of relocating both public libraries in the city (Vilnius University Library and Wróblewski Library) into the building. However, after renovations were completed in 1931, only the Wróblewski Library moved in and became known as the Wróblewski State Library. The library had a small museum with exhibits on the iconography of Vilnius, Masonic lodges, and library's founder. From 1 January 1932, the library received legal deposits from four voivodeships: Wilno (Vilnius), Białystok, Nowogródek, and Polesie. The public reading room opened in 1935. In 1937, the library's statute was passed. It stated that the library was a public institution, available to everyone, and its purpose is to collect all materials primarily relating to the former Grand Duchy of Lithuania, Vilnius and the countries of Eastern Europe. By 1939, the library held about 180,000 documents. An important part of the collection was the deposit of the Scientific and Research Institute of Eastern Europe comprising 73,397 works in 10,594 volumes. Before the war it was the second largest library in the Vilnius region after the Vilnius University Library, and the seventh largest state library in Poland.

=== Lithuanian period ===
Year	Holdings	Ref
1912	71,000	
1925	95,000	
1939	180,000	
1941	380,000	
1945	500,000	
1960	1,508,000	
2009	3,784,000	

When Vilnius was captured by the Soviet Union in September 1939, many valuables from the library were looted and transported to Russia. When Vilnius was returned to Lithuania according to the Soviet–Lithuanian Mutual Assistance Treaty, the library was under Lithuanian administration and was associated with the Institute of Lithuanian Studies (established in 1938), and the library was renamed. Later Lithuanian authorities gave the part of Arsenal Street where the library stood the name of Tado Vrublevskio Street.

After the Soviet occupation in June 1940, the Institute of Lithuanian Studies was merged into the newly established Lithuanian Academy of Sciences in January 1941. Soviet authorities continued to loot and export the library's collection, mainly to Minsk. During the German occupation, the director of the Vilnius State Archive, Juozapas Stakauskas, managed to recover almost all the looted collections. Holdings of many other archives and libraries were transferred to the Wroblewski Library and the number of documents grew to 380,000.

In 1946, the library began receiving deposit copies of Lithuanian publications as well as certain publications from the Soviet Union. In the post-war years, the library changed its focus from a public library geared towards the general public, to a research library geared towards scientists and researchers. After 1965, a number of libraries of various research institutes were turned into branches of the Wroblewski Library. As the library's holdings grew to 2 million items, a new annex was built in 1969–1974. Since 1974, the Library was the only one in Lithuania to receive between 30,000 and 60,000 rubles per year in transfer payments for the purchase of Western foreign literature.

In 2009, the library restored its original Wroblewski name. The name is meant to honor both the library's founder and his parents. The library actively participates in digitization efforts, including the development and maintenance of the major national databases lituanistika.lt (academic studies) and epaveldas.lt (old publications). The library also organizes various exhibitions and events (38 exhibits and 26 other events in 2019). In 2018, the library began creating book museum Bibliopolis.

In 2011, the library had 11,170 registered readers (202 from outside Lithuania) who visited the library 91,333 times and checked out 338,832 documents. The number of visits decreased to 41,725 and the number of checked out items decreased to 109,782 in 2019. As of 2022, the library had 152 employees, 14 departments, and five reading rooms.

== Publications ==
In 1956, the library began publishing various catalogues, bibliographies, and other academic studies. From 1956, it publishes an annual bibliography of publications by the members and employees of the Lithuanian Academy of Sciences. From 2004, it publishes the academic journal LMA Vrublevskių bibliotekos darbai (ISSN 2783-7300) once every two years.

The library publishes bibliography of Lithuanian language studies Lietuvių kalbotyra (14 volumes since 1963 that cover publications printed in 1917–2010), Lithuanian history studies Lietuvos istorijos bibliografija (4 volumes since 1969 that cover 1940–1980), as well as other specialized bibliographies. The library published several catalogues of its collections, including parchments (1980), autographs (1989), manuscripts (1994), old publications about Lithuania (2007). It also published bibliographies of 15th–16th century Latin books published in the Grand Duchy of Lithuania (2002) and publications printed in 1576–1805 by the press of Vilnius University (1979).

The library also published academic studies including on 15th–18th century paper and bookbinding in Lithuania (by Edmundas Laucevičius in 1967 and 1972) and Lithuanian Ex Libris in 1518–1918 (by Vincas Kisarauskas in 1984). The library also published historical materials, including the first Lithuanian dictionary of Konstantinas Širvydas (1979) and results of the Lithuanian population census of 1790 (1972).

== Collections ==
=== Sources of items ===
Holdings of many other archives and libraries were transferred to the Wroblewski Library. These included historical archives of the Diocese of Vilnius, Lithuanian Evangelical Reformed Church (though most were lost during World War II), Karaite community in Lithuania. The library absorbed libraries of the interwar Lithuanian Army, Orthodox Lithuanian Theological Seminary, Society of Friends of Science in Wilno, Lithuanian Scientific Society, Belarusian Scientific Society (collections of Anton Luckievich).

After World War II, library's collections were increased by transferring various collections and archives of closed churches and monasteries, disbanded societies, nationalized manors (including personal collections of Römers, Kossakowskis, Tyszkiewiczs), other museums and libraries. Some rare books were taken from the destroyed libraries in Königsberg, including the Wallenrod Library. Some items were returned from Russia, including items taken to the Russian State Library from the Vilnius Public Library in 1915.

=== Types of items ===
In 2007, the library held 3.75 million items, including 3.48 million books and periodicals and 255,028 manuscripts.

Its collection of old and rare publications exceeds 450,000 items. This includes about 200 publications that are the only known surviving copies as well as 63 incunables and more than 600 paleotypes (books published between 1501 and 1551). The library has more than 12,000 old maps, atlases, and albums. The library also has an extensive collection of periodicals, including pre-1800 periodicals from Western Europe, pre-1945 periodicals published in Lithuania, and pre-1944 Lithuanian periodicals.

The library has a large collection of works that were not originally published. This includes 17 Sumero-Akkadian cuneiform tablets (a gift from Franciszek Tyczkowski), 1,421 parchments from the 11th–20th centuries as well as chronicles written in the 15th–16th centuries, various documents in Latin, Ruthenian, Polish, Russian, German from the 16th–20th centuries, more than 1,000 musical manuscripts from the 14th–20th centuries, more than 20,000 historical photos and postcards. The library also owns personal documents and archives of various scientists and cultural figures.

=== Items of the Memory of the World ===
The Lithuanian national registry under the UNESCO Memory of the World Programme contains 82 items, 15 of which are kept at the Wroblewski Library:

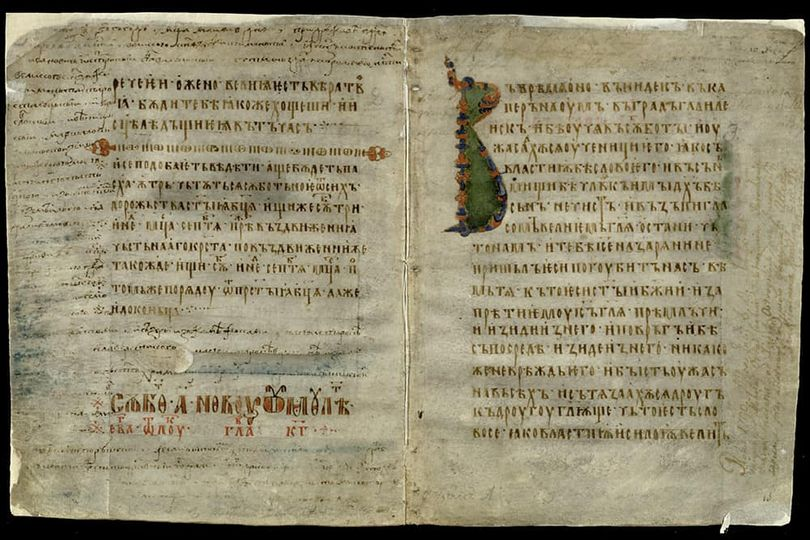
A page from Turov Gospels

- Fragment of the Turov Gospel (11th century): written in the Old Church Slavonic, it is the oldest surviving manuscript preserved in Lithuania. It was once gifted by the Grand hetman Konstanty Ostrogski to a church in Turov.
- Privilege of King of Poland and Grand Duke of Lithuania Jogaila to Vilnius Cathedral (17 February 1387): the earliest surviving parchment written and preserved in Lithuania and a key document of the Christianization of Lithuania.
- Avraamka or Vilnius Manuscript of the Lithuanian Chronicles (1495): ordered by the Bishop of Smolensk Joseph Bolgarinovich and written in Ruthenian by a monk Avraamka, it is the only copy of the Lithuanian Chronicles preserved in Lithuania.
- Composite book with two incunabula (1497 and 1500): the book contains two legal documents written in Czech – the decisions of the Bohemian Diet in 1497 (the only known copy) and the rights and constitutions of the Kingdom of Bohemia during the reign of Vladislaus Jagiellon (1500).
- Royal charter of the Lithuanian Grand Duke Alexander Jagiellon (17 August 1503): the document confirms the founding of the St. Trinity Church in Vitebsk. The first great seal of the Grand Duchy of Lithuania is attached to the document.

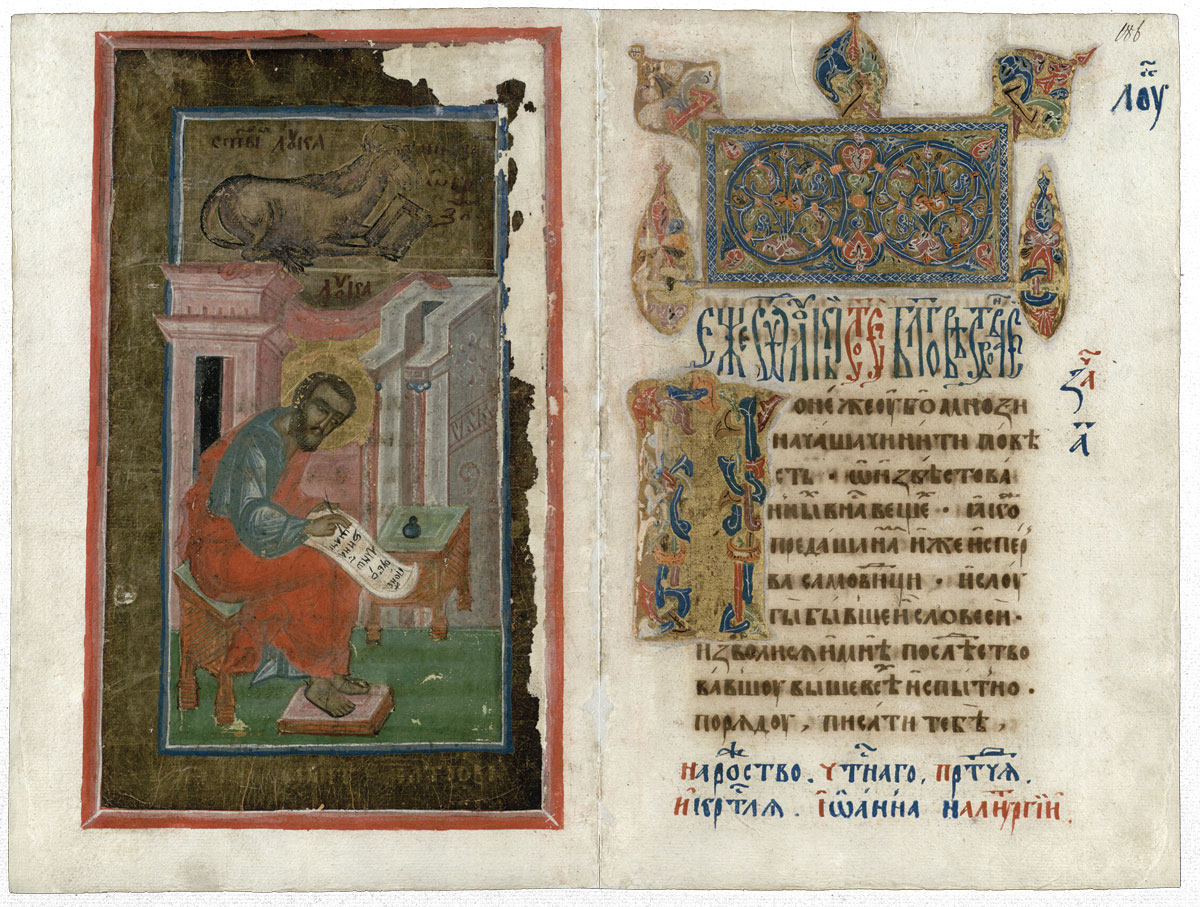
A page from the Zhyrovichy Gospels

- Tetraevangelija [Four Gospels] or Zhyrovichy Gospels (mid-16th century): illustrated and decorated gospel was originally gifted by the Grand Chancellor Lew Sapieha to the Zhyrovichy Monastery in 1616.
- Polish catechism by Jan Seklucjan (1545): the only known copy (discovered in 1997) of the 16-page text that was translated into Lithuanian by Martynas Mažvydas and included in his Simple Words of Catechism (the first Lithuanian-language book).
- Brief Quae ad sanctorum by Pope Clement VIII (7 November 1602): the first official papal document that refers to Prince Casimir Jagiellon as a Catholic saint. It authorized celebration of Casimir's day on 4 March which continues to be marked by the annual folk art and craft fair.
- Membership book of the Sweetest Name of Mary Brotherhood (1671–1938): auxiliary bishop of Vilnius Mikołaj Słupski established the Sweetest Name of Mary Brotherhood at Vilnius Cathedral. Members of the brotherhood signed in the 433-page membership book until 1938, thus presenting an important collection of autographs from kings, bishops, senators, and common town residents. The cover is finely decorated with silver.
- Catholic prayer book by Fulgenty Dryjacki illustrated by Aleksander Tarasewicz (1682): it is the only known surviving copy. The small book is illustrated by 43 woodcuts.
- Panegyric to the Cossack military leader Ivan Mazepa (1690): it is the only known surviving copy of the 18-page Latin panegyric designed in the Baroque style.
- Letter translated into Lithuanian by Kristijonas Donelaitis (19 November 1769): a translation of a German law and persuasive explanation of the benefits of dividing pastures.
- Circular by the Supreme National Council of Lithuania (15 May 1794): a three-page document concerning the appeal issued by Tadeusz Kościuszko during the anti-Russian Kościuszko Uprising. Written in Lithuanian, the circular is an important example of the Lithuanian political press.
- Annotated copy of Dzieje starożytne narodu litewskiego by Teodor Narbutt (1835–1841): Narbutt made various notes and corrections to his nine-volume Polish-language history of the Lithuanian nation hoping to publish a second edition. He continued to make notations until the books (along with the rest his library) were confiscated in 1864 for participating in the anti-Russian January Uprising.
- Documents from the Kretinga Bernardine Monastery (first half of the 19th century): the library owns two out of 134 documents in the collection related to Jurgis Pabrėža and his efforts to create the standard Lithuanian language in the early stages of the Lithuanian National Revival.

== Directors ==
Library's directors were:

- 1925–1932: Stefan Henryk Rygiel
- 1932–1934: Erwin Koschmieder
- 1934–1939: Stefan Burhardt
- 1939: Marian Pieciukiewicz
- 1939–1940: Antanas Valaitis
- 1940–1941: Simas Sužiedėlis
- 1941–1945: Petras Vaičiūnas
- 1945–1948: Juozas Jurginis
- 1948–1950: Vladas Banaitis
- 1950–1963: Stasys Brašiškis
- 1964–2010: Juozas Marcinkevičius
- 2010–present: Sigitas Narbutas

== See also ==
- Martynas Mažvydas National Library of Lithuania
- List of libraries in Lithuania

== Bibliography ==
- Anušauskienė, Lina (2 August 2022). "Lietuvos mokslų akademijos Vrublevskių bibliotekai – 110 metų" (in Lithuanian). Lithuanian Academy of Sciences.
- Braziūnienė, Alma (2022). "Wallenrodia: didelės išsklaidytos bibliotekos mažos dalies katalogas". Knygotyra (in Lithuanian). 78. doi:10.15388/Knygotyra.2022.78.114. ISSN 0204-2061.
- Cicėnienė, Rima; Kairelienė, Leokadija; Narbutas, Sigitas (2012). The Wroblewski Library of the Lithuanian Academy of Sciences, 1912–2012. Lietuvos mokslų akademijos Vrublevskių biblioteka. ISBN 978-9986-498-56-8.
- Kairelienė, Leokadija (2021). "Lietuvos mokslų akademijos Vrublevskių bibliotekos 2019–2020 m. veikla". Lietuvos mokslų akademijos Vrublevskių biblioteka (in Lithuanian). 10: 191–202. doi:10.54506/LMAVB.2021.10.14. ISSN 1648-9772.
- Mašanauskienė, Miglė, ed. (2022). Recording History: Lithuania's Documentary Heritage in the International and National Registers of the UNESCO Memory of the World Programme (PDF). Translated by Kondratas, Ramūnas. Secretariat of the Lithuanian National Commission for UNESCO. ISBN 978-9955-718-11-6.
- Narbutienė, Daiva (2009). "Lietuvos mokslų akademijos bibliotekos Retų spaudinių skyriaus unikumai". Lietuvos mokslų akademijos Vrublevskių biblioteka (in Lithuanian). 2005–2006: 89–99.
- Putek, Alicja Beata (2006). "Biblioteka im. Emilii i Eustachego Wróblewskich w Wilnie" (PDF). Annales Academiae Paedagogicae Cracoviensis (in Polish). 39: 89–104.
- Rauckytė-Bikauskienė, Dalia (2011). "Lietuvos mokslų akademijos Vrublevskių bibliotekos Retų spaudinių skyriaus veikla: skirta 50-osioms įsteigimo metinėms" (PDF). Lietuvos mokslų akademijos Vrublevskių biblioteka (in Lithuanian). 2007/2008: 83–89. ISSN 1648-9772.
- Zezula, Barbara (2015). "Czas polski i czas litewski biblioteki im. Wróblewskich w Wilnie" (PDF). In Kasperek, Bogusław; Wojnarowicz, Stanisława (eds.). Biblioteka w czasie - czas w bibliotece (in Polish). Vol. 1. Lublin: Wydawnictwo Uniwersytetu Marii Curie-Skłodowskiej. ISBN 978-83-7784-763-3.
