= Andrzej Wróblewski =

Polish painter (1927–1957)

- Rozstrzelanie V (Execution V), oil on canvas, 1949; metaphor of German occupation of Poland
- Born: 15 June 1927; Wilno
- Died: 23 March 1957 (aged 29); Tatra Mountains
- Education: Academy of Fine Arts in Krakow
- Known for: Painting
- Movement: Figurative art

Andrzej Krystyn Wróblewski (Polish pronunciation: [ˈand͡ʐɛj vrubˈlɛfskʲi]; 15 June 1927 – 23 March 1957) was a Polish figurative painter who died in a mountaineering accident in 1957 when he was only 29. He is recognized by many as one of Poland's most prominent artists in the early post World War II era, creating a distinctly individualistic approach to representational art.

== Biography ==
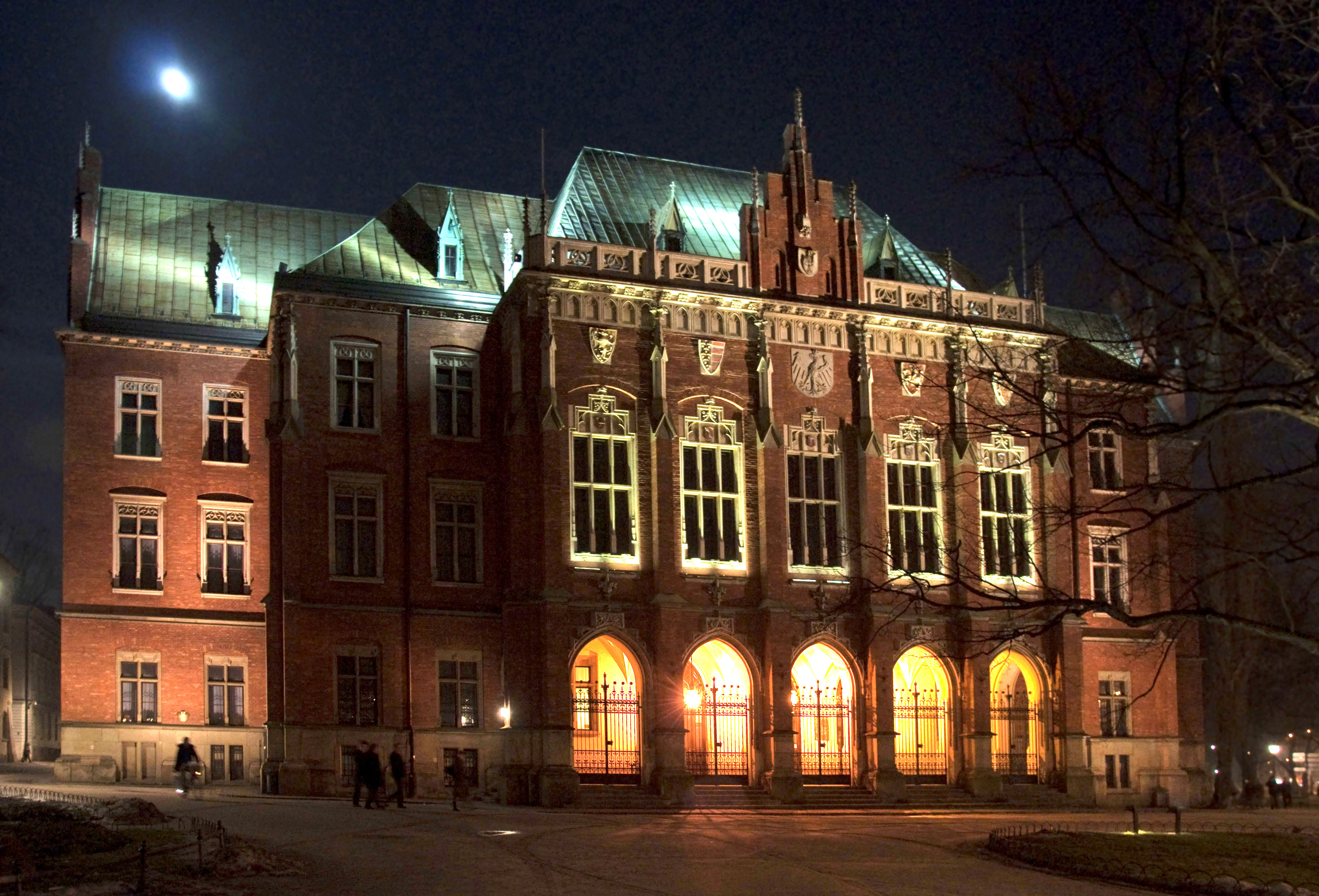
Wróblewski simultaneously studied art history at the famous Jagiellonian University in Kraków in 1945–48.

Wróblewski was born in Wilno (modern Vilnius) on 15 June 1927, the son of law professor Bronisław Wróblewski from the Stefan Batory University and the painter Krystyna Wróblewska. He showed artistic talent at a very young age. His education was interrupted by the German invasion of Poland, although he was able to attend some underground courses; his mother introduced him to the art of woodcut which he practiced from 1944 to 1946.

Immediately after the end of World War II, following the shifting of Poland's national borders, his family moved from Wilno to Kraków, where he passed the matura exams and became a student in the Painting and Sculpture Department of Poland's oldest art school, the Academy of Fine Arts, where he studied between 1945 and 1952 under Zygmunt Radnicki, Zbigniew Pronaszko (pl), Hanna Rudzka-Cybisowa and Jerzy Fedkowicz. Also between 1945 and 1948 he simultaneously studied art history at the Jagiellonian University, Poland's oldest university (and one of the oldest in the world).

== 1945–1949 ==
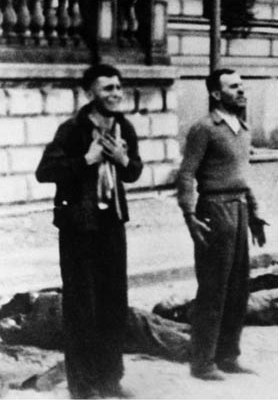
Executions of Polish civilian hostages following the invasion of Poland in 1939. Wróblewski's most famous works were devoted to their memorialization through art.

Through exploration in art Wroblewski devised his own formal style, with his own artistic interpretation, revealed in one of his most famous works Executions dating from the late 1940s illustrating his heightened expressiveness and metaphorical abilities depicting real life events.

He was also highly interested in art theoretician and literature critique at times, since 1948 publishing articles in Głos Plastyków ("Artists' Voice"), Przegląd Artystyczny ("Arts Review"), Twórczość ("Creativity"), Gazeta Krakowska (Kraków's Newspaper) and Życie Literackie ("Literary Life").

== Last years ==
In the early 1950s in the People's Republic of Poland Wróblewski adopted the state-favoured style of socrealism. After the death of Soviet premier Joseph Stalin and resulting destalinization lessened governmental pressures on various spheres of life, art included.

Wroblewski died in a mountaineering accident in Tatry on 23 March 1957. He was the author of over 150 oil paintings, 1400 drawings, dozens of other art forms and over 80 published articles. His works are featured in the collections of many Polish museums and exhibitions.

== Art market ==
In November 2021, his painting titled Two Married Women (Polish: "Dwie mężatki") was sold at an auction in Warsaw for a record 13.4 million zloty (ca. US$3.2 million) becoming at the time the most expensive work of art sold on the Polish market. It was painted in 1949 and is part of the artists' Societal Contrasts series. It is considered an iconic work of Polish post-war art.

== See also ==
- House of Wróblewski (Lubicz)
